= List of discontinued Volkswagen Group petrol engines =

The spark-ignition petrol (gasoline) engines listed below were formerly used in various marques of automobiles and commercial vehicles of the German automotive business Volkswagen Group and also in Volkswagen Industrial Motor applications, but are now discontinued. All listed engines operate on the four-stroke cycle, and, unless stated otherwise, use a wet sump lubrication system and are water-cooled.

Since the Volkswagen Group is European, official internal combustion engine performance ratings are published using the International System of Units (commonly abbreviated SI), a modern form of the metric system of figures. Motor vehicle engines will have been tested by a testing facility accredited by the Deutsches Institut für Normung (DIN), to either the original 80/1269/ EEC, or the later 1999/99/EC standards. The standard unit of measure for expressing the rated motive power output is the kilowatt (kW); and in their official literature, the power rating may be published in either kilowatts or metric horsepower (abbreviated PS in Wikipedia, from the German Pferdestärke), or both, and may also include conversions to imperial units such as the horsepower (HP) or brake horsepower (BHP). (Conversions: one PS ≈ 735.5 watts (W), ≈ 0.98632 hp (SAE)). In case of conflict, the metric power figure of kilowatts (kW) will be stated as the primary figure of reference. For the turning force generated by the engine, the newton metre (N⋅m) will be the reference figure of torque. Furthermore, in accordance with European automotive traditions, engines shall be listed in the following ascending order of preference:

1. Number of cylinders,
2. engine displacement (in litres),
3. engine configuration, and
4. Rated motive power output (in kilowatts).

The petrol engines which Volkswagen Group is currently manufacturing and installing in today's vehicles can be found in the list of Volkswagen Group petrol engines article.

== Air-cooled ==
The Volkswagen air-cooled engine was introduced in 1935 in Germany, produced in factories all over the world, and the last complete engine was produced in December 2005, Its production was ceased by anti-pollution laws and the last engine was produced in São Bernardo do Campo. Its air-cooled, four-cylinder, boxer configuration was unusual in its day for a production automobile, but has gone on to power millions of vehicles around the world, being considered one of the most reliable automotive engines of all eras.

== Water-cooled boxer ==
The Volkswagen Wasserboxer is a horizontally opposed, or boxer, water-cooled four-cylinder petrol engine. It was introduced in 1982, and was produced for ten years, ending in 1992. The wasserboxer was only used in the Volkswagen Type 2 (T3) (T3 Transporter / Caravelle / Vanagon / Kombi / T25).

== Three-cylinder ==
=== 1.2 R3 (EA111) ===
This all-aluminium alloy engine is manufactured at the Škoda Auto plant in Mladá Boleslav.

parts code prefix
03E
engine displacement & engine configuration
1,198 cc (73.1 cu in) inline three engine (R3/I3); bore × stroke: 76.5 mm × 86.9 mm (3.01 in × 3.42 in), stroke ratio: 0.88:1 – under-square/long-stroke, 399.4 cc per cylinder
cylinder block & crankcase
cast aluminium alloy; four main bearings, die-forged steel crossplane crankshaft with 120 degree crankpins, gear-driven contra-rotating balance shaft, simplex chain-driven oil pump
cylinder head & valvetrain
cast aluminium alloy; low-friction roller finger cam followers with automatic hydraulic valve clearance compensation, simplex roller chain-driven overhead camshaft
6v: two valves per cylinder, 6 valves total, single overhead camshaft (SOHC), compression ratio: 10.3:1
12v: four valves per cylinder, 12 valves total, double overhead camshafts (DOHC), compression ratio: 10.5:1
aspiration
plastic intake manifold
fuel system, ignition system & management
common-rail multi-point electronic sequential indirect fuel injection (MPI) with three intake-manifold–sited fuel injectors; three individual spark coils; Siemens SIMOS 9.1 electronic engine control unit (ECU), EU4 compliant
DIN-rated motive power & torque outputs, ID codes – 6v
40 kW (54 PS; 54 bhp) at 4,750 rpm; 108 N⋅m (80 lbf⋅ft) at 3,000 rpm — AWY, BMD
44 kW (60 PS; 59 bhp) at 5,000 rpm; 108 N⋅m (80 lbf⋅ft) at 3,000 rpm — BBM
DIN-rated motive power & torque outputs, ID codes – 12v
44 kW (60 PS; 59 bhp) at 5,200 rpm; 108 N⋅m (80 lbf⋅ft) at 3,000 rpm — CGPB
47 kW (64 PS; 63 bhp) at 5,400 rpm; 112 N⋅m (83 lbf⋅ft) at 3,000 rpm — AZQ, BME
51 kW (69 PS; 68 bhp) at 5,400 rpm; 112 N⋅m (83 lbf⋅ft) at 3,000 rpm — BZG, CEV, CGPA
applications
Volkswagen Fox (BMD: 04/05->), Volkswagen Polo Mk4 (9N, PQ24 – AZQ: 11/01–05/04, AWY: 01/02–05/04, BMD: 05/04–05/07, BME: 11/04–07/07, BBM/BZG: 05/07->), Volkswagen Polo Mk5 (CGPA,CGPB: xx/09-xx/14), Škoda Fabia (AWY: 07/01–05/04, BMD: 05/04–12/07, BME: 12/04–12/07, BBM: 12/06–05/09, BZG: 01/07–05/09, CEV: 01/08->), Škoda Roomster (BME: 05/06–01/07, BZG: 01/07–03/09, CGPA: 03/09->), SEAT Ibiza (BBM: 06/07–05/08, AZQ: 01/02->, BME: 11/04->, BZG: 03/08->), SEAT Cordoba (AZQ: 10/02->, BME: 11/04->), Volkswagen Jetta Konig

== Four-cylinder EA111 ==
The EA111 series of internal combustion engines was initially developed by Audi under Ludwig Kraus’s leadership and introduced in the mid-1970s in the Audi 50, and shortly after in the original Volkswagen Polo. It is a series of water-cooled inline three- and inline four-cylinder petrol and diesel engines, in a variety of displacement sizes. This overhead camshaft engine features a crossflow cylinder head design, and directly driven auxiliary units. The exhaust side is in driving direction, closest to the front of the vehicle.

=== 0.8 R4: 25 kW ===
identification
parts code prefix: 052; engine ID code: HE
engine displacement & engine configuration
0,771 cc (47.0 cu in) inline-four engine (R4/I4); bore × stroke: 65.0 mm × 59.0 mm (2.56 in × 2.32 in), stroke ratio: 1.10:1 – over-square/short-stroke, 195.8 cc per cylinder
cylinder block & crankcase
grey cast iron; five main bearings, die-forged steel crankshaft
cylinder head & valvetrain
cast aluminium alloy; two valves per cylinder, each with two concentric valve springs, sliding-finger cam followers, timing belt-driven single overhead camshaft (SOHC)
fuel system, aspiration
31 PIC or 34 PIC-5 single-barrel downdraft carburettor; cast alloy intake manifold, cast iron exhaust manifold
DIN-rated motive power & torque output
25 kW (34 PS; 34 bhp)
application
Volkswagen Polo (01/76–07/78 – Sweden only)

=== 0.9 R4: 29 kW ===
identification
parts code prefix: 052; engine ID code: HA
engine displacement & engine configuration
0,895 cc (54.6 cu in) inline-four engine (R4/I4); bore × stroke: 69.5 mm × 59.0 mm (2.74 in × 2.32 in), stroke ratio: 1.18:1 – over-square/short-stroke, 224.8 cc per cylinder
cylinder block & crankcase
grey cast iron; five main bearings, die-forged steel crankshaft
cylinder head & valvetrain
cast aluminium alloy; two valves per cylinder, each with two concentric valve springs, sliding-finger cam followers, timing belt-driven single overhead camshaft (SOHC)
fuel system, aspiration
31 PIC or 34 PIC-5 single-barrel downdraft carburettor; cast alloy intake manifold, cast iron exhaust manifold
DIN-rated motive power & torque output
29 kW (39 PS; 39 bhp) at 5,200 rpm; 65 N⋅m (48 lbf⋅ft) at 3,200 rpm
applications
Volkswagen Polo (04/75–09/81), Volkswagen Derby (04/75–09/81)

=== 1.0 R4: 37 kW (Škoda) ===
This engine was originally developed by Škoda Auto, before the company was acquired by Volkswagen Group, and is therefore NOT an EA111 engine. However, this engine was used in some VWs after the takeover.

identification
parts code prefix: 047.D, engine ID codes: AHT, AQV (EU3), ARV (EU2)
engine displacement & engine configuration
1.0 L (61 cu in) inline-four engine (R4/I4); bore: 72 mm (2.83 in), stroke: 61.2, stroke ratio: 1.18:1, 249.05 cc per cylinder, compression ratio: 10:1
cylinder block & crankcase
cast aluminium alloy; three main bearings, cast iron cylinder liners, duplex chain-driven camshaft
cylinder head & valvetrain
cast aluminium alloy; two valves per cylinder, 8 valves total, overhead valve (OHV) with pushrods and rocker shaft
aspiration
cast aluminium alloy intake manifold, cast iron exhaust manifold, underfloor catalytic converter
fuel system
common-rail multi-point electronic sequential indirect fuel injection with four intake manifold-sited fuel injectors
DIN-rated motive power & torque output
37 kW (50 PS; 50 bhp), 86 N⋅m (63 lbf⋅ft)
applications
SEAT Arosa (AHT: 11/98–02/00), Škoda Fabia (AQV/ARV: 10/00–08/02), Volkswagen Lupo

=== 1.0 R4: 16v 51 kW ===
This engine entered production in November 1996, after supplies of the Ford-built 1.0 were depleted. It was called the AT-1000 by Volkswagen do Brasil.

identification
parts code prefix: 036, engine ID codes: AST (Brazil), AVZ
engine displacement & engine configuration
999 cc (61.0 cu in) inline-four engine (R4/I4); bore × stroke: 67.1 mm × 70.6 mm (2.64 in × 2.78 in), stroke ratio: 0.95:1 – under-square/long-stroke, 249.7 cc per cylinder, compression ratio: 10.8:1
cylinder block & crankcase
grey cast iron; five main bearings, die-forged steel crankshaft
cylinder head & valvetrain
cast aluminium alloy; four valves per cylinder, 16 valves total, bucket tappets, timing belt-driven double overhead camshafts (DOHC)
aspiration
plastic intake manifold, cast iron exhaust manifold
fuel system
common-rail multi-point electronic sequential indirect fuel injection with four intake manifold-sited fuel injectors; Total Flex Gasoline or Ethanol on Brazilian AST variant
DIN-rated motive power & torque output
51 kW (69 PS; 68 bhp) at 5750 rpm; 90 N⋅m (66 lbf⋅ft) at 4250 rpm
applications
SEAT Ibiza (AVZ: 05/00–05/02, AST: 06/00–05/02), SEAT Cordoba (AVZ: 05/00–08/02, AST: 06/00–08/02), Volkswagen Gol

=== 1.0 R4: 16v Turbo 82 kW ===
engine displacement & engine configuration
999 cc (61.0 cu in) inline-four engine (R4/I4); bore: 67.1 mm (2.64 in), stroke: 70.6 mm (2.78 in), stroke ratio: 0.95:1 – under-square/long-stroke, 249.8 cc per cylinder, compression ratio: 8.5:1
cylinder block & crankcase
grey cast iron; five main bearings, die-forged steel crankshaft
cylinder head & valvetrain
cast aluminium alloy; four valves per cylinder, double overhead camshafts (DOHC), intake variable valve timing
aspiration
Garrett GT12 turbocharger, intercooler
fuel system & engine management
multi-point electronic sequential indirect fuel injection with four intake manifold-sited fuel injectors; Bosch Motronic ME 3.8.3 engine control unit
DIN-rated motive power & torque output
82 kW (111 PS; 110 bhp) at 5,500 rpm; 155 N⋅m (114 lbf⋅ft) at 4,500 rpm
applications
Volkswagen Gol, Volkswagen Parati

=== 1.05 R4: 29–37 kW ===
Produced: 1981–1996

identification
parts code prefix: 030, engine ID codes: GL, HZ, AAK, AAU, ACM, AEV, WVGS
engine displacement & engine configuration
1,043 cc (63.6 cu in) inline-four engine (R4/I4); bore: 75.0 mm (2.95 in), stroke: 59.0 mm (2.32 in), stroke ratio: 1.27:1 – over-square/short-stroke, 260.7 cc per cylinder,
cylinder block & crankcase
grey cast iron; five main bearings, die-forged steel crankshaft
cylinder head & valvetrain
cast aluminium alloy; two valves per cylinder, 8 valves total, two concentric valve springs per valve, bucket tappets, belt-driven forged or cast steel single overhead camshaft (SOHC)
fuel system & engine management
Pierburg 1B3 or Weber 32 TLA/32 TL carburettor, later with throttle body-sited electronic single-point fuel injection (SPI) and Bosch Mono-Jetronic or Mono-Motronic engine control unit
DIN-rated motive power & torque outputs – carburettor
29 kW (40 PS; 39 bhp) — GL
33 kW (45 PS; 44 bhp) at 5,600rpm — ACM
37 kW (50 PS; 49 bhp) — HZ
DIN-rated motive power * torque outputs – SPI
33 kW (45 PS; 44 bhp) at 5,200 rpm; 76 N⋅m (56 lbf⋅ft) at 2,800 rpm — AAK, AAU, ACM, AEV
applications
Volkswagen Polo (GL: 08/81–10/86, HZ: 08/85–01/92, AAK: 01/90–07/90, AAU: 10/90–07/94, ACM: 02/92–12/92, AEV: 10/94–06/96), Volkswagen Derby (GL: 10/81–11/84), Volkswagen Golf (HZ: 05/85–10/91), Volkswagen Jetta (HZ: 08/86–10/91, AAK: 01/90–07/90), SEAT Ibiza Mk2 (AAU: 02/93–06/96), Trabant 1.1 (WVGS: 1990–1991)

=== 1.1 R4: 37–44 kW ===
Produced: 1974–1983
engine ID codes
HB (FA*, GG**), HC (FJ*), HD; *= Golf/Jetta/Scirocco (1974–79), **= Golf/Jetta/Scirocco (1979–)
engine displacement & engine configuration
1,093 cc (66.7 cu in) inline-four engine (R4/I4); bore: 69.5 mm (2.74 in), stroke: 72.0 mm (2.83 in), stroke ratio: 0.97:1 – under-square/long-stroke, 273.2 cc per cylinder, compression ratio: 8.2:1 (HB); 9.7:1 (HB8); 9.3:1 (HC)
cylinder block & crankcase
grey cast iron; five main bearings, die-forged steel crankshaft
cylinder head & valvetrain
cast aluminium alloy; two valves per cylinder, single overhead camshaft (SOHC)
fuel system
Solex carburettor
DIN-rated motive power & torque outputs
HB: 37 kW (50 PS; 50 bhp) at 5,200 rpm; 76 N⋅m (56 lbf⋅ft) at 2,800 rpm
HD: 38 kW (52 PS; 51 bhp)
HC: 44 kW (60 PS; 59 bhp)
applications
Audi 50, Volkswagen Polo Mk1, Volkswagen Derby, Volkswagen Golf Mk1, Volkswagen Jetta (A1), Volkswagen Scirocco Mk1,

This engine weighs in at only 84 kg (185 lb) including the clutch but not the gearbox.

=== 1.3 I4: 40–50 kW (Škoda) ===
This engine was originally developed by Škoda Auto, before the company was acquired by Volkswagen Group, and is therefore NOT an EA111 engine. However, this engine was used in some Škodas after the takeover.

OHV, engine displacement & engine configuration
1,289 cc (78.7 cu in) inline-four engine (I4); bore × stroke: 75.5 mm × 72.0 mm (2.97 in × 2.83 in), stroke ratio: 1.05:1 – over-square/short-stroke, 322.3 cc per cylinder
cylinder block & crankcase
cast aluminium alloy, three main bearings, duplex chain-driven camshaft
cylinder head & valvetrain
cast aluminium alloy, two valves per cylinder with twin valve springs, overhead valve (OHV) with pushrods and rocker shaft
fuel system & engine management
Pierburg 2E-E Ecotronic dual-barrel carburettor controlled by ECU
Pierburg 2E3 dual-barrel carburettor
Jikov 28–30 LEKR dual-barrel carburettor that derived from above Pierburg 2E3
Bosch electronic single-point fuel injection (SPI), Bosch Mono-Motronic engine control unit
Siemens Simos 2P multi-point fuelinjection
rated motive power & torque output (see Škoda Favorit article for detailed variations)
135 – 43 kW (58 PS; 58 bhp) at 5,000 rpm; 93 N⋅m (69 lbf⋅ft) at 3,000–3,250 rpm
135B – 40 kW (54 PS; 54 bhp) at 5,000 rpm; 93 N⋅m (69 lbf⋅ft) at 3,000–3,250 rpm (from 1993, SPI with catalytic converter)
135M – 40 kW (54 PS; 54 bhp) at 4,500 rpm; 99 N⋅m (73 lbf⋅ft) at 2500 rpm (from 1996, MPI with catalytic converter)
136 – 46 kW (63 PS; 62 bhp) at 5,000 rpm; 100 N⋅m (74 lbf⋅ft) at 3,000–3,750 rpm
136B – 50 kW (68 PS; 67 bhp) at 5,500 rpm; 100 N⋅m (74 lbf⋅ft) at 3,000–3,750 rpm (from 1993, SPI with catalytic converter)
136M – 50 kW (68 PS; 67 bhp) at 5,000 rpm; 106 N⋅m (78 lbf⋅ft) at 2600 rpm (from 1996, MPI with catalytic converter)
applications
Škoda Favorit 135, Škoda Favorit 136, Škoda Felicia. Later, 1.4 8V engine, that derived from this engine was used in Škoda Octavia and Škoda Fabia.

=== 1.3 R4: 40–55 kW ===
Produced: 1977–1994 (Transverse), 1978–1983 (Longitudinal)

engine ID codes
2G, 3F, AAV, FY, FZ, GK, GT, HH, HJ, HK, HW, MH, MN, NU, NZ
engine displacement & engine configuration
1,272 cc (77.6 cu in) inline-four engine (R4/I4); bore × stroke (mm): 75.0 × 72.0, 318.0 cc per cylinder
cylinder block & crankcase
grey cast iron; five main bearings, die-forged steel crankshaft
cylinder head & valvetrain
cast aluminium alloy; two valves per cylinder, single overhead camshaft (SOHC)
fuel system & engine management
Pierburg 2E3 carburettor, later with electronic single-point fuel injection (SPI) and Bosch L-Jetronic or Mono-Motronic engine control unit
DIN-rated motive power & torque outputs
37 kW (50 PS; 50 bhp) at 5200 rpm; 76 N⋅m (56 lbf⋅ft) at 2800 rpm (carb.)
40 kW (54 PS; 54 bhp) at 5000 rpm; 95 N⋅m (70 lbf⋅ft) at 3000 rpm (SPI)
55 kW (75 PS; 74 bhp) at 5900 rpm; 98 N⋅m (72 lbf⋅ft) at 3200 rpm (MPI, or GT)
applications
Volkswagen Polo / Derby (Mk1, Mk2), Volkswagen Golf / Jetta (Mk1, Mk2), Volkswagen Scirocco (Mk1, Mk2), Volkswagen Passat (B1, B2), Volkswagen Santana (B2) : Audi 50, Audi 80 (B2), SEAT Ibiza Mk2 (1993–1994)

=== 1.2 TSI/TFSI (EA111) ===
This engine is manufactured at the Škoda Auto plant in Mladá Boleslav

identification
parts code prefix: 03F, ID codes: CBZA, CBZB, CBZC
engine displacement & engine configuration
1,197 cc (73.0 cu in) inline-four engine (R4/I4); bore × stroke: 71.0 mm × 75.6 mm (2.80 in × 2.98 in), stroke ratio: 0.94:1 – under-square/long-stroke, 299.3 cc per cylinder, compression ratio: 10.5:1, 130 bar (1,890 psi) peak pressures
cylinder block & crankcase
cast aluminium alloy, five main bearings, die-forged steel crankshaft
cylinder head & valvetrain
cast aluminium alloy; low-friction roller finger cam followers with automatic hydraulic valve clearance compensation
two valves per cylinder, 8 valves total, roller chain-driven single overhead camshaft (SOHC)
aspiration
hot-film air mass meter, cast alloy throttle body with electronically controlled Bosch "E-Gas" throttle valve; turbocharger with maximum pressure 1.6 bar (23.2 psi), water-cooled intercooler integrated into intake manifold
fuel system
fully demand-controlled and returnless; – fuel tank–mounted low-pressure fuel pump; Fuel Stratified Injection (FSI): camshaft-driven single-piston high-pressure injection pump supplying up to 150 bar (2,180 psi) fuel pressure in common fuel rail, four combustion chamber sited direct injection sequential fuel injectors, mounted on the intake side between the intake port and cylinder head gasket level, homogeneous mixing, stratified lean-burn operation with excess air at part load; 95 RON ultra-low sulphur unleaded petrol (ULSP)
ignition system & engine management
centrally positioned longlife spark plugs, mapped direct ignition with four individual direct-acting single spark coils; electronic engine control unit (ECU), knock control via a single knock sensor, permanent lambda control, EU5 compliant
DIN-rated motive power & torque outputs
63 kW (85 PS; 84 bhp) at 4,800 rpm; 160 N⋅m (118 lb⋅ft) at 1,500–3,500 rpm — CBZA; Volkswagen Golf Mk6 (05/10->), Audi A1
66 kW (90 PS; 89 bhp) at 4,500 rpm; 160 N⋅m (118 lbf⋅ft) at 1,500–3,500 rpm — CBZC; Volkswagen Polo (05/11->)
77 kW (105 PS; 103 bhp) at 5,000 rpm; 175 N⋅m (129 lbf⋅ft) at 1,550–4,100 rpm — CBZB; SEAT Ibiza
applications
Volkswagen Beetle (A5), Volkswagen Polo Mk5, Volkswagen Golf Mk6, Volkswagen Caddy (05/09->), SEAT Ibiza, SEAT León (1P), SEAT Altea, SEAT Altea XL, SEAT Toledo (2012) (KG) Škoda Octavia (02/10->), Škoda Yeti, Škoda Fabia (02/10->), Audi A1, Škoda Rapid (2012) (NH)
references
auto-motor-sport.de and the Volkswagen press releases to the new Polo 2009
"VW presents new 1.2 litre TSI and 1.6 litre TDI engines for Golf and Polo". WorldCarFans.com. Volkswagen AG. 13 May 2009.
"New engines 1.2 TSI for Leon and Altea". SEAT.com. SEAT. 5 March 2010. Archived from the original on 16 July 2011.
"New engine 1.2 TSI for Octavia". skoda-auto.com. Škoda Auto. 25 January 2010. Archived from the original on 28 July 2011.

=== 1.3 R4: 40 kW ===
engine ID codes
ADX
engine displacement & engine configuration
1,298 cc (79.2 cu in) inline-four engine (R4/I4); bore × stroke (mm): 76.5 × 70.6, 324.5 cc per cylinder, compression ratio: 9.5:1
cylinder block & crankcase
grey cast iron; five main bearings, die-forged steel crankshaft
cylinder head & valvetrain
cast aluminium alloy; two valves per cylinder, single overhead camshaft (SOHC)
fuel system & engine management
electronic single-point fuel injection (SPI), Bosch Mono-Jetronic engine control unit
DIN-rated motive power & torque output
40 kW (54 PS; 54 bhp) at 5,200 rpm; 100 N⋅m (74 lbf⋅ft) at 2,800 rpm
applications
Volkswagen Polo, Volkswagen Golf

=== 1.3 R4: G40 85 kW ===
engine ID codes
MM, PY
engine displacement & engine configuration
1,272 cc (77.6 cu in) inline-four engine (R4/I4); bore × stroke (mm): 75.0 × 72.0, 318.0 cc per cylinder, compression ratio: 8.0:1
cylinder block & crankcase
grey cast iron; five main bearings, die-forged steel crankshaft, cast pistons with increased size gudgeon pins
cylinder head & valvetrain
cast aluminium alloy with post-production heat treatment; two valves per cylinder with two concentric valve springs, belt-driven forged steel single overhead camshaft (SOHC)
aspiration
dual V belt-driven G-Lader scroll-type supercharger with 40 mm diameter inlet, side-mounted intercooler
fuel system & engine management
common-rail multi-point electronic sequential indirect fuel injection with four intake manifold-sited fuel injectors; Bosch Digifant engine control unit
DIN-rated motive power & torque output
85 kW (115 PS; 113 bhp) at 5500 rpm; 150 N⋅m (111 lbf⋅ft) at 3500 rpm
application
Volkswagen Polo Mk2 GT G40 (08/86–07/94)

=== 1.4 R4: 44 kW ===
identification
ID codes: ABD
engine displacement & engine configuration
1,391 cc (84.9 cu in) / 1,398 cc (85.3 cu in) inline-four engine (R4/I4); bore × stroke (mm): 75.0 × 78.7 / 79.14, 347.7 / 349.5 cc per cylinder, compression ratio: 8.8:1
cylinder block & crankcase
grey cast iron; five main bearings, die-forged steel crankshaft
cylinder head & valvetrain
cast aluminium alloy; two valves per cylinder, single overhead camshaft (SOHC)
fuel system & engine management
electronic single-point fuel injection (SPI) and Bosch Mono-Jetronic engine control unit, later multi-point electronic indirect fuel injection with four intake manifold-sited fuel injectors (MPI)
DIN-rated motive power & torque outputs
44 kW (60 PS; 59 bhp) at 5,200 rpm; 107 N⋅m (79 lbf⋅ft) at 2,400–2,800 rpm
44 kW (60 PS; 59 bhp) at 4,700 rpm; 115 N⋅m (85 lbf⋅ft) at 2,800 rpm
applications
Volkswagen Polo, Volkswagen Golf, Volkswagen Vento, SEAT Ibiza, SEAT Córdoba

=== 1.4 R4: 40–44 kW ===
engine displacement & engine configuration
1,390 cc (84.8 cu in) inline-four engine (R4/I4); bore × stroke (mm): 76.5 × 75.6 (1.01 ratio), 347.5 cc per cylinder
cylinder block & crankcase
grey cast iron; five main bearings, die-forged steel crankshaft
cylinder head & valvetrain
cast aluminium alloy; two valves per cylinder, single overhead camshaft (SOHC)
fuel system
multi-point electronic sequential indirect fuel injection with four intake manifold-sited fuel injectors (MPI; )
DIN-rated motive power & torque output
40 kW (54 PS; 54 bhp) at 4,700 rpm; 116 N⋅m (86 lbf⋅ft) at 2,800 rpm (ANX; Austrian market only)
44 kW (60 PS; 59 bhp) at 4,700 rpm; 116 N⋅m (86 lbf⋅ft) at 2,800 rpm (ANW)
applications
Volkswagen Polo, Volkswagen Golf, SEAT Ibiza, SEAT Córdoba

=== 1.4 I4: 44–50 kW (Škoda) ===
This engine was originally developed by Škoda Auto, before the company was acquired by Volkswagen Group, and is therefore NOT an EA111 engine. However, this engine was used in some Škodas after the takeover.

engine displacement & engine configuration
1,397 cc (85.3 cu in) inline-four engine (I4); bore × stroke: 75.5 mm × 78.0 mm (2.97 in × 3.07 in), stroke ratio: 0.97:1 – under-square/long-stroke, 349.2 cc per cylinder
cylinder block & crankcase
cast aluminium alloy; three main bearings, duplex chain-driven camshaft
cylinder head & valvetrain
cast aluminium alloy; two valves per cylinder, overhead valve (OHV) with pushrods and rocker shaft
fuel system & engine management
multi-point indirect fuel injection with four intake manifold-sited fuel injectors
DIN-rated motive power & torque outputs
44 kW (60 PS; 59 bhp) at 5,000 rpm; 118 N⋅m (87 lbf⋅ft) at 2,600 rpm — AZE, AZF
44 kW (60 PS; 59 bhp) at 4,500 rpm; 120 N⋅m (89 lbf⋅ft) at 2,500 rpm — AMD
50 kW (68 PS; 67 bhp) at 5,000 rpm; 120 N⋅m (89 lbf⋅ft) at 2,500 rpm — AQW, AME, ATZ
applications
Škoda Fabia Mk1, Škoda Octavia Mk1

=== 1.4 R4: FSI 63–77 kW ===
engine displacement & engine configuration
1,390 cc (84.8 cu in) inline-four engine (R4/I4); bore × stroke (mm): 76.5 × 75.6 (1.01 ratio), 347.5 cc per cylinder, compression ratio: 12.0:1
cylinder block & crankcase
grey cast iron; five main bearings, die-forged steel crankshaft
cylinder head & valvetrain
cast aluminium alloy; four valves per cylinder, double overhead camshafts (DOHC)
fuel system
common-rail electronic multi-point Fuel Stratified Injection (FSI) homogeneous direct petrol injection, up to 110 bar high-pressure fuel pump, stratified-charge combustion at partial load
aspiration
two-position tumble flap in the intake manifold controlling the turbulence
exhaust
up to 35% exhaust gas recirculation, NOx storage-type catalytic converter
engine management
Bosch Motronic MED 7
DIN-rated motive power & torque outputs, ID codes & applications
63 kW (86 PS; 84 bhp) at 5,000 rpm; 130 N⋅m (96 lbf⋅ft) at 3,750 rpm — AXU: Volkswagen Polo Mk4
66 kW (90 PS; 89 bhp) at 5,200 rpm; 130 N⋅m (96 lbf⋅ft) at 3,750 rpm — BKG, BLN: Volkswagen Golf Mk5 (−05/05)
77 kW (105 PS; 103 bhp) at 6,200 rpm; 131 N⋅m (97 lbf⋅ft) at 4,250 rpm — ARR: Volkswagen Lupo

=== 1.4 R4 ===
identification
parts code prefix: 030, ID codes: AEX, APQ
engine displacement & engine configuration
1,390 cc (84.8 cu in) inline-four engine (R4/I4); bore × stroke: 76.5 mm × 75.6 mm (3.01 in × 2.98 in), stroke ratio: 1.01:1 – square engine, 347.5 cc per cylinder, compression ratio: 10.5:1
cylinder block & crankcase
grey cast iron; five main bearings, die-forged steel crankshaft
cylinder head & valvetrain
cast aluminium alloy; two valves per cylinder, 8 valves total, low-friction roller finger cam followers, timing belt-driven single overhead camshaft (SOHC)
fuel system
electronic fuel injection
DIN-rated motive power & torque output
44 kW (60 PS; 59 bhp) at 4,700 rpm; 116 N⋅m (86 lbf⋅ft) at 2,800–3,200 rpm
55 kW (75 PS; 74 bhp) at 4,800–5,000 rpm; 124 N⋅m (91 lbf⋅ft) at 2,750 rpm
applications
Audi A2, Volkswagen Fox, Volkswagen Golf Mk3, Volkswagen Type 2 (T2) in Brazil, SEAT Ibiza, Volkswagen Polo Mk3
reference
"New VW Fox in depth". WorldCarFans.com. Volkswagen AG. 4 April 2005.

=== 1.4 R4: 16v ===
identification
parts code prefix: 036
engine displacement & engine configuration
1,390 cc (84.8 cu in) inline-four engine (R4/I4); bore × stroke: 76.5 mm × 75.6 mm (3.01 in × 2.98 in), stroke ratio: 1.01:1 – square engine, 347.5 cc per cylinder, compression ratio: 10.5:1
cylinder block & crankcase
cast aluminium alloy; five main bearings, die-forged steel crankshaft
cylinder head & valvetrain
cast aluminium alloy; four valves per cylinder, 16 valves total, dual overhead camshaft (DOHC)
fuel system & engine management
multi-point electronic indirect fuel injection with four intake manifold-sited fuel injectors (MPI), Magneti Marelli 4MV & 4HV engine control unit
DIN-rated motive power & torque outputs, ID codes
55 kW (75 PS; 74 bhp) at 5,000 rpm; 128 N⋅m (94 lbf⋅ft) at 3,300 rpm — AHW, AXP, AKQ, APE, AUA, BCA, BBY, BKY
59 kW (80 PS; 79 bhp) at 5,000 rpm; 132 N⋅m (97 lbf⋅ft) at 3,800 rpm — BUD, CGGA
63 kW (86 PS; 84 bhp) at 5,000 rpm; 132 N⋅m (97 lbf⋅ft) at 3,800 rpm — BXW, CGGB (EU4 & EU5)
74 kW (101 PS; 99 bhp) at 6,000 rpm; 126 N⋅m (93 lbf⋅ft) at 4,400 rpm — AFH, AFK, AUB, BBZ (discontinued)
applications
Audi A2, SEAT Ibiza, SEAT Córdoba, SEAT León Mk1 (1M), SEAT Altea, SEAT Toledo, Škoda Fabia, Škoda Octavia II, Škoda Octavia II Tour (CGGA), Škoda Octavia II FL (CGGA), Škoda Roomster (BXW: 05/06->2011, CGGB:2011–>), Volkswagen Lupo, Volkswagen Polo MK5, Volkswagen Golf MK6, Volkswagen Bora, Volkswagen Jetta, Volkswagen New Beetle

=== 1.6 R4: 48–55 kW ===
engine ID codes
AEE, AEA, ABU, ALM
engine displacement & engine configuration
1,598 cubic centimetres (97.5 cu in) inline-four engine (R4/I4); bore × stroke (mm): 76.5 × 86.9 (0.88 ratio), 399.5 cc per cylinder, compression ratio: 9.8:1
cylinder block & crankcase
grey cast iron; five main bearings, die-forged steel crankshaft
cylinder head & valvetrain
cast aluminium alloy; two valves per cylinder, 8 valves total, single overhead camshaft (SOHC)
fuel system & engine management
SPI: electronic single-point fuel injection (SPI), Bosch Mono-Jetronic engine control unit
MPI: multi-point electronic indirect fuel injection with four intake manifold-sited fuel injectors (MPI), Magneti Marelli 1AV engine control unit
EWG-rated motive power & torque output, ID code & application
48 kW (65 PS; 64 bhp) — 496: Volkswagen Industrial Motor (12/77–01/84)
DIN-rated motive power & torque outputs
SPI: 55 kW (75 PS; 74 bhp) at 5,200 rpm; 128 N⋅m (94 lbf⋅ft) at 2,800–3,400 rpm – AEA
SPI: 55 kW (75 PS; 74 bhp) at 5,200 rpm; 125 N⋅m (92 lbf⋅ft) at 3,400 rpm – ABU
MPI: 55 kW (75 PS; 74 bhp) at 4,500 rpm; 137 N⋅m (101 lbf⋅ft) at 3,500 rpm – AEE, ALM
applications
Volkswagen Polo Mk3, Volkswagen Golf Mk3, Volkswagen Passat B3, SEAT Ibiza Mk2, SEAT Toledo Mk1, Škoda Felicia, Škoda Octavia Mk1

=== 1.6 R4: FSI 81–85 kW ===
engine displacement & engine configuration
1,598 cc (97.5 cu in) inline-four engine (R4/I4); bore × stroke (mm): 76.5 × 86.9 (0.88 ratio), 399.5 cc per cylinder, compression ratio: 12.0:1
cylinder block & crankcase
grey cast iron; five main bearings, die-forged steel crankshaft
cylinder head & valvetrain
cast aluminium alloy; four valves per cylinder, belt-driven and BLF chain-driven double overhead camshafts (DOHC)
fuel system
common-rail electronic multi-point Fuel Stratified Injection (FSI) homogeneous direct petrol injection, up to 110 bar high-pressure fuel pump, stratified-charge combustion at partial load
aspiration
cast aluminium alloy intake manifold, two-position tumble flap controlling the turbulence
exhaust
up to 35% exhaust gas recirculation, NOx storage-type catalytic converter
engine management
Bosch Motronic MED 7
DIN-rated motive power & torque outputs, ID codes & applications
81 kW (110 PS; 109 bhp) at 5,800 rpm; 155 N⋅m (114 lbf⋅ft) at 4,400 rpm — BAD: Audi A2, Volkswagen Golf Mk4, Volkswagen Bora, Volkswagen Jetta Mk4
85 kW (116 PS; 114 bhp) at 6,000 rpm; 155 N⋅m (114 lbf⋅ft) at 4,000 rpm — BAG, BLF, BLP: Audi A3 Mk2, Škoda Octavia Mk2, Volkswagen Golf Mk5, Volkswagen Jetta Mk5, Volkswagen Eos, Volkswagen Touran, Volkswagen Passat B6
reference
"Audi A2 1.6 FSI with Direct Petrol Injection" (Press release). Audi AG. 10 March 2001.

=== 1.6 R4: 16v 88–92 kW (GTI) ===
engine displacement & engine configuration
1,598 cc (97.5 cu in) inline-four engine (R4/I4); bore × stroke (mm): 76.5 × 86.9 (0.88 ratio), 399.5 cc per cylinder
cylinder block & crankcase
grey cast iron; five main bearings, die-forged steel crankshaft
cylinder head & valvetrain
cast aluminium alloy; four valves per cylinder, double overhead camshafts (DOHC)
fuel system & engine management
multi-point electronic sequential indirect fuel injection with four intake manifold-sited fuel injectors; Bosch Motronic engine control unit
DIN-rated motive power & torque outputs, ID codes
88 kW (120 PS; 118 bhp) at 6,200 rpm; 150 N⋅m (111 lbf⋅ft) at 4,000 rpm — AJV
92 kW (125 PS; 123 bhp) at 6,500 rpm; 152 N⋅m (112 lbf⋅ft) at 3,300 rpm — ARC, AVY
applications
Volkswagen Polo GTI, Volkswagen Lupo GTI, Volkswagen GX3

=== 1.8 R4: G60 118–154 kW ===
engine ID codes
1H, PG
engine displacement & engine configuration
1,781 cc (108.7 cu in) inline-four engine (R4/I4); bore × stroke: 81.0 mm × 86.4 mm (3.19 in × 3.40 in), stroke ratio: 0.94:1 – under-square/long-stroke, 445.2 cc per cylinder, compression ratio: 8.0:1
cylinder block & crankcase
grey cast iron; five main bearings, die-forged steel crankshaft, cast pistons with increased size gudgeon pins
cylinder head & valvetrain
cast aluminium alloy with post-production heat treatment; sodium-cooled exhaust valves, automatic hydraulic valve clearance compensation, belt-driven forged steel single overhead camshaft (SOHC)
8v: two valves per cylinder each with two concentric valve springs, 8 valves total
16v: four valves per cylinder each with two concentric valve springs, 16 valves total
aspiration
dual V belt-driven G-Lader scroll-type supercharger with 60 mm diameter inlet and electronically controlled boost regulation, side-mounted intercooler (SMIC), front-mounted intercooler (FMIC) on 16v variant
fuel system & engine management
common-rail multi-point electronic sequential indirect fuel injection with four intake manifold-sited fuel injectors; Bosch Digifant engine control unit, knock sensor
DIN-rated motive power & torque outputs, applications
8v: 118 kW (160 PS; 158 bhp) at 5,800 rpm; 225 N⋅m (166 lbf⋅ft) at 4,000 rpm — VW Golf Mk2 G60 (08/88–07/89), VW Passat G60 (08/88–07/93), VW Corrado G60 (09/88–07/93)
16v: 154 kW (209 PS; 207 bhp) at 6,300 rpm — VW Golf Mk2 Limited 4WD (this version was a homologation special, and does not appear in any official parts catalogues)
reference
Sly, James (January–February 1990). "Development of the G-60". VW & Porsche magazine. pp. 52–53.

== Four-cylinder EA827/EA113 ==
The EA827 engine series was initially developed by Audi under Ludwig Kraus leadership.

=== 1.0 R4: 37 kW ===
Produced: 1996–2005
identification
parts code prefix: 030, ID codes: AER, ALD, ALL, ANV, ATE, AUC
engine displacement & engine configuration
999 cc (61.0 cu in) inline-four engine (R4/I4); bore × stroke: 67.1 mm × 70.6 mm (2.64 in × 2.78 in), stroke ratio: 0.95:1 – under-square/long-stroke, 249.7 cc per cylinder, compression ratio: 10.8:1
cylinder block & crankcase
grey cast iron (cast aluminium alloy – AER/ALL); five main bearings, die-forged steel crankshaft
cylinder head & valvetrain
cast aluminium alloy; two valves per cylinder, 8 valves total, initially: bucket tappets (AER/ALL) – later: low-friction roller rocker arms with automatic hydraulic clearance compensation (ALD/ANV/ATE/AUC), timing-belt-driven single overhead camshaft (SOHC)
aspiration
plastic intake manifold, cast iron exhaust manifold – AUC with integrated starter/primary catalytic converter, underfloor main catalytic converter, exhaust gas recirculation on AUC
fuel system & engine management
common-rail multi-point electronic sequential indirect fuel injection with four intake manifold-sited fuel injectors; initially: Bosch Digifant engine control unit (ECU) (AER/ALL/ATE) – later: Bosch Motronic MP 9.0 electronic engine control unit (ALD/ANV/AUC)
EWG-rated motive power & torque output, application, ID codes
37 kW (50 PS; 50 bhp) — Volkswagen Industrial Motor (AER: 02/99–05/00, ATE: 06/00->)
DIN-rated motive power & torque output
37 kW (50 PS; 50 bhp) at 5,000 rpm; 86 N⋅m (63 lbf⋅ft) at 3,000–3,600 rpm — (discontinued)
applications
SEAT Arosa (AER: 02/97–09/99, ALL: 08/97–05/99, ALD/ANV: 07/99–07/00, AUC: 07/00–06/04),

SEAT Ibiza Mk2 (AER: 09/96–06/99, ANV: 08/99–07/00, ALD: 08/99–05/02, AUC: 07/00–05/02), SEAT Cordoba (AER: 06/97–06/99, ANV: 08/99–07/00, ALD: 08/99–08/02, AUC: 07/00–08/02), Volkswagen Lupo (AER/ALL/ANV/ALD/AUC: 11/98–05/05) (?),

Volkswagen Polo Mk3 (AER: 09/96–12/99, ANV/ALD/AUC: 01/00–12/01) (?)

reference
"030.S ATE 1.0 ltr [sic] OTTO Industrial Motor". mi-uk.com. Volkswagen AG. Archived from the original on 29 July 2013.

=== 1.3 R4: 40–44 kW ===
Produced 1972–1978, 1981–1988 (Longitudinal applications)

engine ID codes
EP, EU, ZA, ZP
engine displacement & engine configuration
1,297 cc (79.1 cu in) inline-four engine (R4/I4); bore × stroke (mm): 75.0 × 73.4, 324.25 cc per cylinder. Sometimes listed as 1,296 cc
cylinder block & crankcase
grey cast iron; five main bearings, die-forged steel crankshaft
cylinder head & valvetrain
cast aluminium alloy; two valves per cylinder, single overhead camshaft (SOHC) via toothed belt.
fuel system & engine management
Solex/Pierburg 30/35 PDSIT carburettor (early), Pierburg 2E3 carburettor (late)
DIN-rated motive power & torque outputs
40 kW (55 PS; 54 bhp) at 5500 rpm; 91–94 N⋅m (67–69 lbf⋅ft) at 3200 rpm (ZA/ZP)
44 kW (60 PS; 59 bhp) at 5600 rpm; 100 N⋅m (74 lbf⋅ft) at 3500 rpm (EP/EU)

applications
Audi 80 (B1), Volkswagen Passat (B1, B2), Volkswagen Santana (B2)

=== 1.6 R4 51–75 kW ===
identification
parts code prefix: 06B, ID code: AHP (75 kW)
engine displacement & engine configuration
1,595 cc (97.3 cu in) inline-four engine (R4/I4); bore × stroke: 81.0 mm × 77.4 mm (3.19 in × 3.05 in), stroke ratio: 1.05:1 – over-square/short-stroke, 398.8 cc per cylinder, compression ratio: 10.3:1
cylinder block & crankcase
aluminium alloy aluminium alloy; five main bearings, die-forged steel crankshaft
cylinder head & valvetrain
cast aluminium alloy; two valves per cylinder, single overhead camshaft (SOHC)
fuel system & engine management
carburettor
multi-point electronic indirect fuel injection with four intake manifold-sited fuel injectors; Bosch ME 7 electronic engine control unit (ECU)
electronic indirect injection Total Flex gasoline, LPG and/or ethanol (Brazil)
ARM with Simos (by Siemens) ecu
DIN-rated motive power & torque outputs, ID codes
51 kW (70 PS; 69 bhp) at 5,200 rpm; 118 N⋅m (87 lbf⋅ft) at 2,700 rpm — carburettor, G-Kat; PP
74 kW (100 PS; 99 bhp) at 5,800 rpm; 140 N⋅m (103 lbf⋅ft) at 3,500 rpm — AFT, AKS
75 kW (102 PS; 101 bhp) at 6,300 rpm; 135 N⋅m (100 lbf⋅ft) at 3,500 rpm — ABB
74 kW (100 PS; 99 bhp) at 5,800 rpm; 135 N⋅m (100 lbf⋅ft) at 4,400 rpm — AEK (10/94–12/95) – Golf, Vento, Passat
74 kW (100 PS; 99 bhp) at 5,300 rpm; 140 N⋅m (103 lbf⋅ft) at 3,800 rpm — ANA, ARM, ADP, AHL
74 kW (100 PS; 99 bhp) at 5,600 rpm; 145 N⋅m (107 lbf⋅ft) at 3,800 rpm — AEH, AKL, APF, AUR, AWH
75 kW (102 PS; 101 bhp) at 5,600 rpm; 148 N⋅m (109 lbf⋅ft) at 3,800 rpm — ALZ, AVU, AYD, BFQ, BFS, BGU, BSE, BSF, CCS, CHG, CMX
applications
Audi: Audi A3 Mk1 & Mk2 (AEH: 09/96–06/01, AKL: 08/97–06/03, APF: 06/99–08/00, AVU: 05/00–04/02, BFQ: 05/02–06/03, BGU: 05/03–05/05, BSE/BSF: 06/05–03/13, CCSA: 12/07–03/13, CMXA: 05/08–03/13), Audi 80 (ABB: 08/90–05/93), Audi A4 B5, B6 & B7 (ADP: 11/94–10/96, AHL: 10/96–07/99, ANA: 08/98–06/00, ARM: 08/98–10/91, ALZ: 06/00–06/08), Audi 100 (ABB: 03/92–07/93)
SEAT: SEAT Ibiza Mk2 (AFT: 09/95–06/99, AKL: 06/99–05/02, AEH: 01/00–05/02, APF: 03/00–10/00, AUR: 07/00–05/02), SEAT Córdoba Mk1 (AFT: 09/95–06/99, AKL: 06/99–08/02, AEH: 01/00–08/02, APF: 03/00–10/00, AUR: 07/00–08/02), SEAT León Mk1 & Mk2 (AEH: 08/99–10/05, AKL: 11/99–10/05, BFQ: 10/05–06/06, BSE/BSF: 07/05–12/12, CCSA: 07/05–12/12, CHGA: 12/09–12/12, CMXA: 05/10–12/12), SEAT Altea (BGU: 03/04–05/05, BSE/BSF: 05/05–06/13, CCSA: 12/07–06/13, CHGA: 09/09–07/15, CMXA: 05/10–06/13), SEAT Toledo Mk1, Mk2 & Mk3 (AFT, AKS: 09/96–03/99, AKL: 10/98–07/04, AEH: 11/98–07/04, BGU: 02/04–03/06, BSE/BSF: 05/05–05/09, CCSA: 12/07–05/09), SEAT Exeo (ALZ: 03/09–09/10)
Škoda: Škoda Octavia Mk1 & Mk2 (AEH: 12/97–12/07, AKL: 08/98–12/07, AVU: 08/00–04/02, BFQ: 04/02–12/10, BGU: 05/04–05/05, BSE/BSF: 05/05–06/13, CCSA: 11/07–06/13, CHGA: 08/09–11/12, CMXA: 11/08–06/13)
VW/VWCV: Volkswagen Polo Mk3 (AFT: 12/95–08/99, AEH/AKL: 10/99–09/01, APF: 03/00–10/00, AUR: 07/99–09/01), Volkswagen Golf Mk3 (AFT: 07/95–10/00, AKS: 04/97–10/00), Volkswagen Golf Mk4 (AKL: 10/97–05/04, AEH: 01/98–05/04, APF: 05/99–04/01, AVU: 09/99–04/02), Volkswagen Golf Mk5 (BFQ: 05/02–06/06, BGU: 01/04–07/07, BSE/BSF: 05/05–12/13, CCSA: 11/07–12/08), Volkswagen Golf Mk6 (CCSA: 01/09–12/13, CHGA: 03/09–12/13, CMXA: 10/08–12/13), Volkswagen Vento (AFT: 01/96–12/97, AKS: 04/97–12/97), Volkswagen Bora (AKL: 08/98–05/05, AEH: 09/98–05/05, APF: 05/99–09/00, AVU: 09/99–04/02, BFQ: 05/02–05/05), Volkswagen Jetta (74 kW AHP: 05/98–01/02, BGU: 05/04–05/05, BSE/BSF: 08/05->, CCSA: 01/08–10/10), Volkswagen Touran (BGU: 07/03–05/05, BSE/BSF: 06/05–05/10), Volkswagen New Beetle (AWH: 11/99–10/00, AYD: 06/00–07/05, BFS: 06/02–09/10), VW Passat B4, B5 & B6 (AFT: 12/95–12/96, ADP: 01/97–10/97, AHL: 10/96–08/00, ARM: 01/99–08/00, ANA: 07/99–08/00, ALZ: 10/00–05/05, BSE/BSF: 05/05–11/10), Volkswagen Caddy Mk3 (BGU: 04/04–05/05, BSE/BSF: 06/05–05/15, CHGA: 05/11–05/15) Volkswagen Citi Mk1, Volkswagen VeloCITI, Volkswagen Citi Life

=== 1.8 R4 50–74 kW ===
identification
parts code prefix: ???
engine displacement & engine configuration
1,781 cc (108.7 cu in) inline-four engine (R4/I4); bore × stroke: 81.0 mm × 86.4 mm (3.19 in × 3.40 in), stroke ratio: 0.94:1 – under-square/long-stroke, 445.2 cc per cylinder
cylinder block & crankcase
grey cast iron; five main bearings
cylinder head & valvetrain
cast aluminium alloy; two valves per cylinder, bucket tappets, single overhead camshaft (SOHC)
fuel system
Pierburg 2E2 carburettor
EWG-rated motive power & torque output, ID code & application
50 kW (68 PS; 67 bhp) — 262: Volkswagen Industrial Motor (06/83–03/94)
DIN-rated motive power & torque outputs, ID codes
55 kW (75 PS; 74 bhp) at 5,000 rpm; 140 N⋅m (103 lbf⋅ft) at 2,500 rpm — AAM, ANN, DD
66 kW (90 PS; 89 bhp) at 5,200 rpm; 142 N⋅m (105 lbf⋅ft) at 3,000 rpm — RP
66 kW (90 PS; 89 bhp) at 5,500 rpm; 145 N⋅m (107 lbf⋅ft) at 2,500 rpm — ABS, ADZ, ANP, ACC, ADD
72 kW (98 PS; 97 bhp) at 5,400 rpm; 143 N⋅m (105 lbf⋅ft) at 3,000 rpm — 1P
74 kW (101 PS; 99 bhp) at 5,200 rpm; 155 N⋅m (114 lbf⋅ft) at 3,800 rpm — AYJ
applications
Audi 80, Audi 100, SEAT Ibiza Mk2, SEAT Córdoba Mk1, SEAT Toledo Mk1, Volkswagen Golf Mk2, Volkswagen Golf Mk3, Volkswagen Golf Mk3.5 Cabriolet, Volkswagen Golf Mk3 Variant, Volkswagen Vento, VW Jetta Mk2, VW Jetta Mk3, VW Passat B2, VW Passat B3, VW Passat B4, Volkswagen Santana 2000

=== 1.8 R4 16V 102 kW ===
engine ID code
PL, KR
engine displacement & engine configuration
1,781 cc (108.7 cu in) inline-four engine (R4/I4); bore × stroke: 81.0 mm × 86.4 mm (3.19 in × 3.40 in), stroke ratio: 0.94:1 – under-square/long-stroke, 445.2 cc per cylinder, compression ratio: 10:1
cylinder block & crankcase
grey cast iron; five main bearings, die-forged steel crankshaft, cast pistons
cylinder head & valvetrain
cast aluminium alloy with post-production heat treatment; sodium-cooled exhaust valves, automatic hydraulic clearance compensation, timing-belt-driven forged steel double overhead camshafts (DOHC)
16v: multi-valve|four valves per cylinder each with two concentric valve springs, 16 valves total
aspiration
normal
fuel system & engine management
Bosch K-Jetronic
DIN-rated motive power & torque outputs, applications
16v: 102 kW (139 PS; 137 bhp) VW Golf, VW Passat B3, VW Scirocco Mk2 16V
reference: Golf/Corrado/Passat Owners Handbooks

=== 1.8 R4 82 kW ===
identification
parts code prefix: ???, ID code: DZ
engine displacement & engine configuration
1,781 cc (108.7 cu in) inline-four engine (R4/I4); bore: 81.0 mm (3.19 in), stroke: 86.4 mm (3.40 in)
cylinder block & crankcase
grey cast iron, five main bearings
cylinder head & valvetrain
aluminium alloy, two valves per cylinder, bucket tappets, single overhead camshaft (SOHC)
fuel system
multi-point electronic indirect fuel injection with four intake manifold-sited fuel injectors
DIN-rated motive power & torque output
82 kW; 112 PS; 110 bhp
applications
Audi 80 (01/83–12/91), Audi 90 (08/89–12/91), Audi Coupé B2/B3 (08/86–07/91)

=== 1.8 R4 20v 92 kW ===
This is a naturally aspirated version of the 1.8 R4 20vT.

identification
parts code prefix: ???, ID codes: AGN, APG, ADR, ARG, APT, AVV
engine displacement & engine configuration
1,781 cc (108.7 cu in) inline-four engine (R4/I4); bore: 81.0 mm (3.19 in), stroke: 86.4 mm (3.40 in)
cylinder block & crankcase
grey cast iron, five main bearings
cylinder head & valvetrain
aluminium alloy, five valves per cylinder, bucket tappets, double overhead camshafts (DOHC)
fuel system & engine management
multi-point electronic sequential indirect fuel injection with four intake manifold-sited fuel injectors, 95 RON/ROZ unleaded; Bosch Motronic ME 7.5 electronic engine control unit
DIN-rated motive power & torque outputs
92 kW (125 PS; 123 bhp) at 5,800 rpm; 168 N⋅m (124 lbf⋅ft) at 3,500 rpm
92 kW (125 PS; 123 bhp) at 6,000 rpm; 170 N⋅m (125 lbf⋅ft) at 4,200 rpm
92 kW (125 PS; 123 bhp) at 5,800 rpm; 173 N⋅m (128 lbf⋅ft) at 3,950 rpm
applications
Audi A3 (AGN: 09/96–08/00, APG: 11/99–06/03), Audi A4 (ADR: 11/94–04/99, ARG: 07/98–11/01, APT: 02/99–09/01, AVV: 06/00–09/01), Audi Cabriolet (ADR: 04/97–08/00), Audi A6 (ADR: 10/95–11/97), SEAT León (AGN: 11/99–12/03, APG: 06/00–10/05), SEAT Toledo (AGN: 10/98–12/03, APG: 06/00–07/04), Škoda Octavia (AGN: 10/96–1999), Volkswagen Passat (ADR: 12/96–01/99, APT: 01/99–08/00, ARG: 02/99–08/00), Volkswagen Golf Mk4 (AGN: 10/97–11/00), Volkswagen Bora (AGN: 02/99–10/00)

=== 2.0 8V R4 (EA827) ===
identification
parts code prefix: ???
engine displacement & engine configuration
1,984 cc (121.1 cu in) inline-four engine (R4/I4); bore × stroke: 82.5 mm × 92.8 mm (3.25 in × 3.65 in), stroke ratio: 0.89:1 – under-square/long-stroke, 496.1 cc per cylinder, compression ratio: 10.0–10.5:1
cylinder block & crankcase
CG25 grey cast iron; five main bearings; die-forged steel crankshaft, forged steel connecting rods
cylinder head & valvetrain
cast aluminium alloy; two valves per cylinder, 8 valves total, hydraulic bucket tappets, timing belt-driven one-piece cast single overhead camshaft (SOHC)
aspiration
cast aluminium alloy intake manifold
engine management
Bosch Motronic or Siemens Simos electronic engine control unit (ECU)
EWG-rated motive power & torque outputs, application, ID codes
37 kW (50 PS; 50 bhp) at 2,800 rpm; 140 N⋅m (103 lbf⋅ft) at 2,100–2,400 rpm — Volkswagen Industrial Motor multi-fuel (petrol / LPG / CNG) – CBS (08/06->)
43 kW (58 PS; 58 bhp) at 2,800 rpm; 143 N⋅m (105 lbf⋅ft) at 2,100–2,400 rpm — Volkswagen Industrial Motor multi-fuel (petrol / LPG / CNG) – BEF (04/02->)
DIN-rated motive power & torque outputs, ID codes
80 kW (109 PS; 107 bhp) at 5,400 rpm; 160 N⋅m (118 lbf⋅ft) at 3,500 rpm — Ecofuel (bivalent) at 2,600 rpm — ATM
85 kW (115 PS; 113 bhp) at 5,400 rpm; 172 N⋅m (127 lbf⋅ft) at 3,200 rpm — AZH, AZJ
85 kW (115 PS; 113 bhp) at 5,400 rpm; 172 N⋅m (127 lbf⋅ft) at 3,500 rpm — AZM
85 kW (115 PS; 113 bhp) at 5,200 rpm; 170 N⋅m (125 lbf⋅ft) at 2,700–4,700 rpm — AXA, AZL, AQY
88 kW (120 PS; 118 bhp) at 5,600 rpm; 174 N⋅m (128 lbf⋅ft) at 2,400 rpm — ATF
88 kW (120 PS; 118 bhp) at 5,600 rpm; 175 N⋅m (129 lbf⋅ft) at 2,600 rpm — AUZ, ASU, AVA
applications
SEAT Ibiza Mk2 & Mk3, SEAT Córdoba, SEAT Toledo Mk1, SEAT Alhambra, Škoda Fabia Mk1 (6Y), Škoda Octavia Mk1 (1U), Škoda Superb Mk1 (3U), Volkswagen Santana, Volkswagen Polo Mk4, Volkswagen Golf Mk3, Volkswagen Golf Mk4, Volkswagen Vento, Volkswagen Bora, Volkswagen Jetta, Volkswagen New Beetle, VW Passat B3, VW Passat B4, VW Passat B5, Volkswagen Transporter (T5), Volkswagen Industrial Motor
reference
Volkswagen Industrial – Technical specifications EST gaseous fuel engine (PDF). Volkswagen AG. Archived from the original (PDF) on 14 July 2011.

=== 2.0 R4 16v 100–110 kW ===
identification
parts code prefix: ???, ID codes: ABF, 9A
engine displacement & engine configuration
1,984 cc (121.1 cu in) inline-four engine (R4/I4); bore: 82.5 mm (3.25 in), stroke: 92.8 mm (3.65 in), stroke ratio: 0.89:1 – under-square/long-stroke, 496.0 cc per cylinder
cylinder block & crankcase
CG25 grey cast iron, five main bearings, die-forged steel crankshaft, forged steel connecting rods
cylinder head & valvetrain
cast aluminium alloy, multi-valve|four valves per cylinder, 16 valves total, double overhead camshafts (DOHC)
aspiration
cast aluminium alloy intake manifold
engine management
Siemens 5WP4 304 (Golf & Ibiza) CIS-E, or Bosch Motronic, or Digifant (ABF) engine control units
DIN-rated motive power & torque outputs
9A: 100 kW (136 PS; 134 bhp) at 5,800 rpm; 180 N⋅m (133 lbf⋅ft) at 3,500 rpm (CIS-E & Motronic)
ABF: 110 kW (150 PS; 148 bhp) at 6,000rpm; 180 N⋅m (133 lbf⋅ft) at 4,800 rpm
applications
SEAT Córdoba SX, SEAT Ibiza Cupra, SEAT Toledo, Volkswagen Vento/Jetta, Volkswagen Golf GTI 16V, Volkswagen Passat

=== 2.0 R4 20v 96 kW ===
identification
parts code prefix: 06B, ID code: ALT
engine displacement & engine configuration
1,984 cc (121.1 cu in) inline-four engine (R4/I4); bore: 82.5 mm (3.25 in), stroke: 92.8 mm (3.65 in)
cylinder block & crankcase
cast aluminium alloy, five main bearings, die-forged steel crankshaft, contra-rotating balancer shaft, forged steel connecting rods
cylinder head & valvetrain
cast aluminium alloy, five valves per cylinder, 20 valves total, bucket tappets, double overhead camshafts (DOHC), continuous intake camshaft adjustment
aspiration
two-position variable cast aluminium alloy intake manifold
fuel system & engine management
multi-point electronic sequential indirect fuel injection with four intake manifold-sited fuel injectors, 95 RON/ROZ unleaded; Bosch Motronic electronic engine control unit (ECU)
DIN-rated motive power & torque output
96 kW (131 PS; 129 bhp) at 5,700 rpm; 195 N⋅m (144 lbf⋅ft) at 3,300 rpm
applications
Audi A4 (12/00–06/08), Audi A6 (06/01–01/05), Volkswagen Passat (11/01–05/05)

=== 2.0 R4 16v FSI (EA113) ===
identification
parts code prefix: 06D, ID code: AXW, BLR, BLY, BPG, BVY, BVZ, BWT (North America)
engine displacement & engine configuration
1,984 cc (121.1 cu in) inline-four engine (R4/I4); bore × stroke: 82.5 mm × 92.8 mm (3.25 in × 3.65 in), stroke ratio: 0.89:1 – under-square/long-stroke, 496.1 cc per cylinder, compression ratio: 11.5:1
cylinder block & crankcase
AlSi aluminium alloy; five main bearings, die-forged steel crankshaft
cylinder head & valvetrain
cast aluminium alloy; four valves per cylinder, 16 valves total, low-friction roller finger cam followers, double overhead camshafts (DOHC), continuously adjustable intake camshaft
aspiration
variable intake manifold and dual-branch front pipe
fuel system
common-rail Fuel Stratified Injection (FSI), single-piston high-pressure injection pump, air-guided homogeneous combustion process, stratified lean-burn operation with excess air at part load
DIN-rated motive power & torque output
110 kW (150 PS; 148 bhp) at 6,000 rpm; 200 N⋅m (148 lbf⋅ft) at 3,500 rpm
applications
VW Golf Mk5, VW Jetta, VW Passat, Audi A3, Audi A4, Škoda Octavia, SEAT León, SEAT Toledo, SEAT Altea
reference
"Audi A3 Sportback – in depth" (Press release). Audi AG. 19 July 2004. Archived from the original on 15 March 2005.

== Four-cylinder LT/MWM ==
=== 2.0 R4 52–55 kW (EA831) ===
This engine was designed by NSU with assistance from Daimler-Benz as "Projekt Mexiko" (H-engine) and found its way to Audi for sole use in the Volkswagen LT. Other versions of this engine were installed in cars as diverse as the Porsche 924 and the AMC Gremlin. This engine has no connection or common parts with any EA827 derivative, including inline four, inline five, or inline six-cylinder designs.

identification
parts code prefix: 046, ID codes: CL, CH
engine displacement & engine configuration
1,984 cc (121.1 cu in) inline-four engine (R4/I4); bore × stroke: 86.5 mm × 84.4 mm (3.41 in × 3.32 in), stroke ratio: 1.02:1 – square engine, 496.0 cc per cylinder, compression ratios: CL – 7.0:1, CH – 8.3:1
cylinder block & crankcase
grey cast iron; five main bearings, die-forged steel crankshaft, cast alloy oil sump
cylinder head & valvetrain
cast aluminium alloy; two valves per cylinder each with two concentric valve springs, 8 valves total, screw-adjustable bucket tappets, timing-belt-driven single overhead camshaft (SOHC)
fuel system
35 PDSIT 28 mm or 1B1 single-barrel carburettor, 85 RON petrol, 80 RON for CL
DIN-rated motive power & torque outputs, ID codes
CL: 52 kW (71 PS; 70 bhp) at 4,300 rpm; 132 N⋅m (97 lbf⋅ft) at 2,400
CH: 55 kW (75 PS; 74 bhp) at 4,300 rpm; 152 N⋅m (112 lbf⋅ft) at 2,400
application
Volkswagen LT (CH: 04/75–11/82, CL: 05/76-??/??)

=== 2.3 R4 105 kW ===
identification
parts code prefix: 00A, ID code: AGL Mercedes-Benz M111 engine
engine displacement & engine configuration
2,295 cc (140 cu in) inline-four engine (R4/I4); bore: 90.9 mm (3.58 in) stroke: 88.4 mm (3.48 in), stroke ratio: 1.03:1, 573.7 cc per cylinder, viscous cooling fan
cylinder block & crankcase
grey cast iron; five main bearings, die-forged steel crankshaft
cylinder head & valvetrain
cast aluminium alloy; two valves per cylinder, 8 valves total, bucket tappets, duplex roller chain-driven double overhead camshafts (DOHC)
aspiration
cast aluminium alloy intake manifold with separate throttle valve body, cast iron exhaust manifold; exhaust gas recirculation (EGR)
fuel system, ignition system & engine management
fuel tank sited electric fuel pump, multi-point electronic indirect fuel injection with four intake manifold-sited fuel injectors; two dual-output ignition coils, electronic engine control unit (ECU)
DIN-rated motive power & torque output
105 kW (143 PS; 141 bhp)
application
Volkswagen LT (05/96–11/01)

== Five-cylinder ==
=== 1.9 R5 10v ===
identification
parts code prefix: 035
engine displacement & engine configuration
1,921 cc (117.2 cu in), inline five engine (R5/I5); bore × stroke: 79.5 mm × 77.4 mm (3.13 in × 3.05 in), stroke ratio: 1.03:1 – over-square/short-stroke, 384.2 cc per cylinder
cylinder block & crankcase
grey cast iron, very small run in aluminium; six main bearings, pressed steel oil sump
cylinder head & valvetrain
cast aluminium alloy; two valves per cylinder, each with two concentric valve springs, 10 valves total, shim-adjustable bucket tappets, timing-belt-driven single overhead camshaft (SOHC)
fuel system
Keihin carburettor
DIN-rated motive power & torque outputs, ID codes
74 kW (101 PS; 99 bhp) — WH
85 kW (116 PS; 114 bhp) — WN
applications
Audi 80 (WN: 08/81–07/83), Audi Coupé (WN: 10/80–07/83), Audi 100 (WH: 08/80–07/84), Volkswagen Passat (WN: 01/81–07/83), VW Santana (WN: 01/81–07/83)

=== 2.0 R5 10v/20v ===
identification
parts code prefix: 034/035
engine displacement & engine configuration
1,994 cc (121.7 cu in), inline five engine (R5/I5); bore × stroke: 81.0 mm × 77.4 mm (3.19 in × 3.05 in), stroke ratio: 1.05:1 – over-square/short-stroke, 398.8 cc per cylinder
cylinder block & crankcase
grey cast iron; six main bearings, pressed steel oil sump
cylinder head & valvetrain
cast aluminium alloy
10v: two valves per cylinder, each with two concentric valve springs, 10 valves in total, shim-adjustable bucket tappets, timing-belt-driven single overhead camshaft (SOHC)
20v: four valves per cylinder, each with two concentric valve springs, 20 valves in total, bucket tappets, timing belt & simplex roller chain hybrid-driven double overhead camshafts (DOHC)
aspiration – 4v
cast alloy intake manifold, tubular-branch exhaust manifold
fuel system
10v: Bosch K/KE-Jetronic multi-point indirect fuel injection with five intake manifold-sited fuel injectors
20v: electronic sequential multi-point indirect fuel injection with five intake manifold-sited fuel injectors
DIN-rated motive power & torque outputs, ID codes
10v: 81 kW (110 PS; 108 bhp) — JL (Japan; catalyzed)
10v: 83 kW (113 PS; 111 bhp) — SK, SL (U-Kat; unregulated catalytic converter)
10v: 85 kW (115 PS; 113 bhp) — HP, JS, KP, PS, RT
20v: 103 kW (140 PS; 138 bhp) — JD (Japan; catalyzed)
20v: 118 kW (160 PS; 158 bhp) — NM
applications
Audi 80 (JS: 08/82–07/84, HP: 08/83–07/84, JL: 08/83–07/84), Audi 90 (HP/JL/JS: 10/84–03/87, SK: 02/86–03/87, PS: 04/87–12/91, NM: 01/88–12/91), Audi 100 (KP: 08/84–12/87, RT: 01/88–12/90, SL: 02/86–12/87), Audi Coupé (HP/JS: 08/83–07/86, JL: 08/83–07/88, SK: 02/86–07/86, NM: 08/90–07/91), Volkswagen Passat/Santana (JS: 08/83–03/88, HP: 08/83–07/88)

=== 2.1 R5 10v ===
identification
parts code prefix: 035
engine displacement & engine configuration
2,144 cc (130.8 cu in), inline five engine (R5/I5); bore × stroke: 79.5 mm × 86.4 mm (3.13 in × 3.40 in), stroke ratio: 0.92:1 – under-square/long-stroke, 428.9 cc per cylinder
cylinder block & crankcase
grey cast iron; six main bearings, pressed steel oil sump
cylinder head & valvetrain
cast aluminium alloy; two valves per cylinder, each with two concentric valve springs, 10 valves total, shim-adjustable bucket tappets, timing-belt-driven single overhead camshaft (SOHC)
fuel system
Bosch K/KE-Jetronic multi-point indirect fuel injection with five intake manifold-sited fuel injectors
DIN-rated motive power & torque outputs
79 kW (107 PS; 106 bhp) — WE (Australia, Japan, Sweden)
85 kW (116 PS; 114 bhp) — WE, KM (Japan)
applications
Audi 80 (WE-79/85 kW: 08/81–07/83), Audi Coupé (WE-79 kW: 08/81–07/82, KM: 08/82–07/83), Audi 100 (WE-79/85 kW: 03/77–07/82), Volkswagen Passat (WE: 01/81–07/83)

=== 2.2 R5 10v ===
identification
parts code prefix: 034
engine displacement & engine configuration
2,226 cc (135.8 cu in), inline five engine (R5/I5); bore × stroke: 81.0 mm × 86.4 mm (3.19 in × 3.40 in), stroke ratio: 0.94:1 – under-square/long-stroke, 445.2 cc per cylinder
cylinder block & crankcase
grey cast iron; six main bearings, pressed steel oil sump
cylinder head & valvetrain
cast aluminium alloy; two valves per cylinder, each with two concentric valve springs, 10 valves total, shim-adjustable bucket tappets, timing-belt-driven single overhead camshaft (SOHC)
fuel system
multi-point K/KE-jetronic indirect fuel injection with five intake manifold-sited fuel injectors
DIN-rated motive power & torque outputs, ID codes
79 kW (107 PS; 106 bhp) — WU
85 kW (116 PS; 114 bhp) — KZ, WB
88 kW (120 PS; 118 bhp) — KX, PX
89 kW (121 PS; 119 bhp) — JT
96 kW (131 PS; 129 bhp) — KE, KF, KL
98 kW (133 PS; 131 bhp) — KV
100 kW (136 PS; 134 bhp) — HY, PR, WC, WG, WK
101 kW (137 PS; 135 bhp) — HX, KU
applications
Audi 80 (KK/KL: 08/82–07/84), Audi 90 (KV: 06/84–12/91, HY: 06/84–03/87, KX: 01/85–03/87, JT: 08/85–03/87), Audi Coupé (KE: 08/81–07/84, KL: 08/82–07/84, HY: 08/84–07/88, KV: 08/84–07/91, KX: 01/85–07/88, JT: 08/85–12/87), Audi 100 (WG: 08/76–07/80, WC: 08/76–07/84, WB: 04/78–07/84, KF/WU: 08/82–07/84, KZ: 08/84–09/86, HX: 08/84–12/87, KU: 08/84–12/90, PX: 08/85–07/86, PR: 08/89–12/90), Audi C2 200 (WK: 10/79–09/82, WC: 10/79–07/84, KU: 08/84–07/85), Volkswagen Passat (HY: 08/84–07/88, KV: 01/85–03/88, KX: 08/85–03/88, JT: 08/85–07/88)

=== 2.2 R5 10v turbo ===
identification
parts code prefix: 034/035
engine displacement & engine configuration
2,226 cc (135.8 cu in), inline five engine (R5/I5); bore × stroke: 81.0 mm × 86.4 mm (3.19 in × 3.40 in), stroke ratio: 0.94:1 – under-square/long-stroke, 445.2 cc per cylinder, oil cooler
cylinder block & crankcase
grey cast iron; six main bearings, die-forged steel crankshaft, pressed steel or cast aluminium alloy oil sump
WR: cast aluminium alloy
cylinder head & valvetrain
cast aluminium alloy; two valves per cylinder, each with two concentric valve springs, 10 valves total, initially: shim-adjustable bucket tappets – later: one-piece bucket tappets, timing-belt-driven single overhead camshaft (SOHC)
aspiration
water-cooled KKK turbocharger with remote wastegate, intercooler, cast iron exhaust manifold
fuel system
multi-point electronic indirect fuel injection with five intake manifold-sited fuel injectors
DIN-rated motive power & torque outputs, ID codes
100 kW (136 PS; 134 bhp) — KH
119 kW (162 PS; 160 bhp) — WX
121 kW (165 PS; 162 bhp) — MC
125 kW (170 PS; 168 bhp) — KJ, WJ, WS
134 kW (182 PS; 180 bhp) — JY, KG
140 kW (190 PS; 188 bhp) — 2B
147 kW (200 PS; 197 bhp) — GV, MB, WR, 1B
applications
Audi Quattro (GV/WR: 07/80–07/87, MB/WX: 08/87–07/89), Audi 100 (MC: 03/86–12/90), Audi C2 200 5t/Audi C3 200 turbo (WJ: 10/79–09/82, WS: 08/80–12/81, KJ: 08/81–09/82, KH: 08/83–07/85, JY: 08/83–01/87, KG: 08/83–12/87, MC: 01/85–11/90, 1B/2B: 02/88–11/90)

=== 2.2 R5 20v turbo ===
identification
parts code prefix: 034
engine displacement & engine configuration
2,226 cc (135.8 cu in), inline five engine (R5/I5); bore × stroke: 81.0 mm × 86.4 mm (3.19 in × 3.40 in), stroke ratio: 0.94:1 – under-square/long-stroke, 445.2 cc per cylinder, compression ratio: 9.30:1, oil cooler
cylinder block & crankcase
grey cast iron, alloy for KW; six main bearings, die-forged steel crankshaft, cast aluminium alloy oil sump
cylinder head & valvetrain
cast aluminium alloy; four valves per cylinder, each with two concentric valve springs, 20 valves in total, initially: shim-adjustable bucket tappets – later: one-piece bucket tappets, timing belt & simplex roller chain hybrid-driven double overhead camshafts (DOHC)
aspiration
water-cooled turbocharger with remote wastegate, intercooler, tubular-branch exhaust manifold
fuel system & engine management
common-rail multi-point electronic sequential indirect fuel injection with five intake manifold-sited fuel injectors; Bosch Motronic electronic engine control unit (ECU)
DIN-rated motive power & torque outputs
162 kW (220 PS; 217 bhp) — RR, 3B
169 kW (230 PS; 227 bhp) at 5,900 rpm; 350 N⋅m (258 lbf⋅ft) at 1,950 rpm — AAN, ABY
225 kW (306 PS; 302 bhp) — KW
applications
Audi Sport Quattro (KW: 05/84–07/87), Audi Quattro (RR: 08/89–07/91), Audi C3 200 quattro (3B: 03/89–11/90), Audi S2 (3B: 09/90–09/92, ABY: 10/92–05/95), Audi C4 S4 (AAN: 08/91–07/94), Audi C4 S6 (AAN: 06/94–07/97)

=== 2.2 R5 20v turbo ===
identification
parts code prefix: 034, engine ID code: ADU
engine displacement & engine configuration
2,226 cc (2.2 L; 135.8 cu in), inline-five engine (R5/I5); bore × stroke: 81 mm × 86.4 mm (3.19 in × 3.40 in), stroke ratio: 0.94 mm (0.037 in):1 – under-square/long-stroke, 445.2 cc (27.17 cu in) per cylinder, compression ratio: 9.0:1, oil cooler
cylinder block & crankcase
grey cast iron; six main bearings, die-forged steel crankshaft, cast aluminium alloy oil sump
cylinder head & valvetrain
cast aluminium alloy; 4 valves per cylinder each with two concentric valve springs, 20 valves in total, one-piece bucket tappets, toothed belt and simplex chain-driven (hybrid system) double overhead camshafts (DOHC)
aspiration
water-cooled turbocharger, front-mounted intercooler (FMIC), tubular-branch exhaust manifold
fuel system, ignition system & engine management
common-rail multi-point electronic sequential indirect fuel injection with five intake manifold-sited fuel injectors; two LAZ pre-power output stage control units and five single spark ignition coils with Bosch spark plugs; Bosch Motronic electronic engine control unit (ECU), powered by PORSCHE
DIN-rated motive power & torque output
315 PS (232 kW; 311 bhp) at 6,500 rpm; 410 N⋅m (302 lb⋅ft; 42 kg⋅m) at 3,000 rpm
application
Audi RS2 Avant (03/94–07/95) "ID and data from ETKA".

=== 2.3 R5 10v/20v ===
identification
parts code prefix: 034 (054: AAR)
engine displacement & engine configuration
2,309 cc (140.9 cu in), inline five engine (R5/I5); bore × stroke: 82.5 mm × 86.4 mm (3.25 in × 3.40 in), stroke ratio: 0.95:1 – under-square/long-stroke, 461.9 cc per cylinder
cylinder block & crankcase
grey cast iron; six main bearings, die-forged steel crankshaft, pressed steel or cast aluminium alloy oil sump
cylinder head & valvetrain
cast aluminium alloy
10v: two valves per cylinder, each with two concentric valve springs, 10 valves in total, bucket tappets, timing-belt-driven single overhead camshaft (SOHC), compression ratio: 10.1:1
20v: four valves per cylinder, each with two concentric valve springs, 20 valves in total, bucket tappets, timing belt & simplex roller chain hybrid-driven double overhead camshafts (DOHC), compression ratio: 10.3:1
aspiration
dual-barrel throttle valve, two-piece (one-piece on 20v) cast alloy intake manifold, two-piece cast iron exhaust manifold
fuel system & engine management
10v: Bosch KE-Jetronic multi-point indirect fuel injection with five intake manifold-sited fuel injectors
20v: common-rail multi-point electronic indirect fuel injection with five intake manifold-sited fuel injectors; MPI electronic engine control unit (ECU)
DIN-rated motive power & torque outputs, ID codes
10v: 98 kW (133 PS; 131 bhp) at 5,500 rpm; 185 N⋅m (136 lbf⋅ft) at 3,500 rpm — NG, AAR
10v:100 kW (136 PS; 134 bhp) — NF Audi 100 Avant Duo
20v:125 kW (170 PS; 168 bhp) at 6,200 rpm — 7A
applications
Audi 80 (NG: 09/91–11/94), Audi 90 (NG: 04/87–12/91, 7A: 06/88–12/91), Audi Coupé (NG: 08/86–07/94, 7A: 11/88–07/91), Audi Cabriolet (NG: 06/91–07/94), Audi 100 (NF: 08/86–12/90, AAR: 12/90–07/94), Audi A6 (AAR: 06/94–06/96) "ID and data from ETKA".

=== 2.3 VR5 10v/20v ===
This engine was sometimes badged as a "V5".

identification
parts code prefix: 071/066
engine displacement & engine configuration
2,324 cc (141.8 cu in) VR5 engine; bore × stroke: 81.0 mm × 90.2 mm (3.19 in × 3.55 in), stroke ratio: 0.90:1 – under-square/long-stroke, 464.8 cc per cylinder
cylinder block & crankcase
grey cast iron; six main bearings
cylinder head & valvetrain
cast aluminium alloy
10v: two unequal-length valves per cylinder, each with two concentric valve springs, 10 valves in total, roller chain relay-driven double overhead camshafts (DOHC)
20v: four unequal-length valves per cylinder, 20 valves in total, roller finger cam follower, self-adjusting hydraulic tappets, simplex roller chain relay-driven double overhead camshafts (DOHC) with ECU-controlled variable valve timing for both inlet and exhaust valves, compression ratio: 10.8:1
aspiration
plastic variable intake manifold, tubular exhaust manifold
fuel system & engine management
common-rail multi-point electronic sequential indirect fuel injection with five intake manifold-sited fuel injectors; MPI electronic engine control unit (ECU)
DIN-rated motive power & torque outputs, ID codes
10v: 110 kW (150 PS; 148 bhp) at 6,000 rpm; 209 N⋅m (154 lbf⋅ft) at 3,200 rpm — AGZ
20v: 125 kW (170 PS; 168 bhp) at 6,200 rpm; 220 N⋅m (162 lbf⋅ft) at 3,300 rpm — AQN, AZX
applications
SEAT Toledo (AGZ: 10/98–11/00, AQN: 09/00–11/03), Volkswagen Golf (AGZ: 10/97–02/01, AQN: 09/00–05/06), Volkswagen Bora (AGZ: 09/98–02/01, AQN: 09/00–05/05), Volkswagen New Beetle (AQN: 10/00->), Volkswagen Passat (AGZ: 09/97–08/00, AZX: 01/01–05/05) "ID and data from ETKA".

=== 2.5 R5 10v ===
engine displacement & engine configuration
2,461 cc (150.2 cu in), inline five engine (R5/I5); bore × stroke: 81.0 mm × 95.5 mm (3.19 in × 3.76 in), stroke ratio: 0.85:1 – under-square/long-stroke, 492.1 cc per cylinder
cylinder block & crankcase
grey cast iron; six main bearings
cylinder head & valvetrain
cast aluminium alloy; two valves per cylinder each with two concentric valve springs, 10 valves total, belt-driven single overhead camshaft (SOHC)
fuel system & engine management
common-rail multi-point electronic sequential indirect fuel injection with five intake manifold-sited fuel injectors; Digifant or SIMOS electronic engine control unit (ECU) with Bosch distributor
DIN-rated motive power & torque outputs, ID codes
75 kW (102 PS; 101 bhp) — AXL
81 kW (110 PS; 109 bhp) — AAF, ACU, AEN, AEU
85 kW (116 PS; 114 bhp) at 4,500 rpm; 190 N⋅m (140 lbf⋅ft) at 2,400 rpm — AET, APL, AVT
applications
Volkswagen Transporter (AAF: 09/90–12/93, ACU: 01/94–10/96, AEN: 05/95–12/95, AET: 08/96–06/03, AEU: 08/96–06/03, APL: 05/99–12/99, AVT: 12/99–06/03, AXL: 04/01–06/03), Volkswagen California (AAF: 09/90–07/93, ACU: 08/93–10/96, AEU: 08/96–04/02, AET: 08/96–09/03, APL: 05/99–12/99, AVT: 12/99–04/02, AXL: 04/01–06/03) "ID and data from ETKA".

=== 2.5 R5 20v (EA855) ===
This engine was only used in the North American, South American, and is being used in Middle Eastern markets, as the replacement for the inline-four naturally aspirated 2.0-litre 8v. This engine was replaced by the GEN3 EA888 I4 in North America.

identification
parts code prefix: 07K
engine displacement & engine configuration
2,480 cc (151.3 cu in) inline five engine (R5/I5); bore × stroke: 82.5 mm × 92.8 mm (3.25 in × 3.65 in), stroke ratio: 0.89:1 – under-square/long-stroke, 496.1 cc per cylinder
cylinder block & crankcase
GJL250 grey cast iron; two-part sump, 6-bolt cast or die-forged steel crankshaft with six steel main bearings, water-cooled oil cooler
cylinder head & valvetrain
cast aluminium alloy; four valves per cylinder, 20 valves total, low-friction roller finger cam followers with automatic hydraulic valve clearance compensation, chain-driven (relay method, using two simplex roller chains) double overhead camshafts (DOHC), variable intake valve timing
aspiration
Plastic intake manifold, single throttle body with electronically controlled drive by wire throttle butterfly valve
fuel system
multi-point electronic sequential indirect fuel injection with five intake manifold-sited fuel injectors
ignition system & engine management
five individual direct-acting single spark coils with longlife spark plugs, Bosch Motronic engine control unit (ECU), secondary air injection during cold start phase to reduce emissions, single knock sensor
exhaust system
one-piece cast iron 5-into-1 exhaust manifold, ceramic catalytic converter, two heated oxygen sensors (three when equipped with California emissions) for permanent lambda control
DIN-rated motive power & torque outputs, ID codes
110 kW (150 PS; 148 bhp) at 5,000 rpm; 225 N⋅m (166 lbf⋅ft) at 3,750 rpm — January 2005 (BGP/BGQ/BPR/BPS)
125 kW (170 PS; 168 bhp) at 5,700 rpm; 239 N⋅m (176 lbf⋅ft) at 4,250 rpm — from May 2007 (CBT/CBU)
applications
BGP/BGQ/BPR/BPS: Volkswagen Jetta (2005–2007), Volkswagen New Beetle (2006–2011), Volkswagen Rabbit (Golf Mk5) (2006–2007).
CBT/CBU: Volkswagen Beetle (A5) (2012–2014), Volkswagen Golf Mk6 (2010–2014), Volkswagen Jetta (2008–2013), Volkswagen Passat NMS (2012–2014 (US)), in the Middle East in Volkswagen Passat NMS (2019–2022), Volkswagen Rabbit (2008–2009).

== Six-cylinder ==
=== 2.4 R6 66–70 kW ===
identification
parts code prefix: 073
engine displacement & engine configuration
2,383 cc (145.4 cu in) inline six engine (R6/I6); bore × stroke: 76.5 mm × 86.4 mm (3.01 in × 3.40 in), stroke ratio: 0.89:1 – under-square/long-stroke, 397.1 cc per cylinder, compression ratio: 8.1:1
cylinder block & crankcase
grey cast iron; seven main bearings, die-forged steel crossplane crankshaft, pressed steel oil sump
cylinder head & valvetrain
cast aluminium alloy; two valves per cylinder each with two concentric valve springs, timing-belt-driven single overhead camshaft (SOHC) directly acting on shim-adjustable bucket tappet valve lifters
aspiration
cast aluminium alloy intake manifold (two-part on fuel injected variant), two cast iron exhaust manifolds
fuel system
DL: 2B6 or 2E3 dual-barrel carburettor
1E: Digifant fuel injection with six manifold-sited fuel injectors and one common fuel rail
DIN-rated motive power & torque outputs, ID codes
66 kW (90 PS; 89 bhp) at 4500 rpm — DL
70 kW (95 PS; 94 bhp) at 4200 rpm — 1E (with exhaust catalytic converter)
application
Volkswagen LT (DL: 08/82–07/92, 1E: 08/88–12/95)

=== 2.4 V6 30v 100–125 kW ===
identification
parts code prefix: 077, 078; ID code: AMM, ALF, AML, AFM, APS, AGA, AJG, ALW, AMM, APC, APZ, ARJ, ARN, ASM, BDV
engine displacement & engine configuration
2,393 cc (146.0 cu in) 90° V6; bore × stroke: 81.0 mm × 77.4 mm (3.19 in × 3.05 in), stroke ratio: 1.05:1 – over-square/short-stroke, 398.8 cc per cylinder, compression ratio: 10.5:1
cylinder block & crankcase
grey cast iron; die-forged steel crankshaft
cylinder heads & valvetrain
cast aluminium alloy; five valves per cylinder, 30 valves total, double overhead camshafts
fuel system & engine management
multi-point electronic sequential indirect fuel injection with six intake manifold-sited fuel injectors; Bosch Motronic electronic engine control unit (ECU); 95 RON/ROZ(91 AKI) EuroPremium (regular) unleaded recommended for optimum performance and fuel economy
DIN-rated motive power & torque output, ID codes
100 kW (136 PS; 134 bhp) at 6,000 rpm; 230 N⋅m (170 lb⋅ft) at 3,200 rpm — ALW, ARN, ASM
110 kW (150 PS; 148 bhp) at 6,000 rpm; 230 N⋅m (170 lb⋅ft) at 3,200 rpm — AFM
115 kW (156 PS; 154 bhp) at 6,000 rpm; 230 N⋅m (170 lb⋅ft) at 3,200 rpm — APC
120 kW (163 PS; 161 bhp) at 6,000 rpm; 230 N⋅m (170 lb⋅ft) at 3,200 rpm — ALG, AJG, AMM, APZ
121 kW (165 PS; 162 bhp) at 6,000 rpm; 230 N⋅m (170 lb⋅ft) at 3,200 rpm — AGA, AML, ALF, APS, ARJ
125 kW (170 PS; 168 bhp) at 6,000 rpm; 230 N⋅m (170 lb⋅ft) at 3,200 rpm — BDV
applications
Audi Cabriolet, Audi A6, Audi A4

=== 2.4 V6 24v 130 kW ===
This 2.4 V6 is a smaller version of the all-alloy 3.2 V6 FSI – without the variable intake manifold and the FSI direct injection.

identification
parts code prefix: ???; ID code: BDW
engine displacement & engine configuration
2,393 cc (146.0 cu in) 90° V6; bore × stroke: 81.0 mm × 77.4 mm (3.19 in × 3.05 in), stroke ratio: 1.05:1 – over-square/short-stroke, 398.8 cc per cylinder, compression ratio: 11.3:1
cylinder block & crankcase
homogeneous monobloc low-pressure gravity die casting hypereutectic Alusil aluminium-silicon alloy (AlSi17Cu4Mg) with a closed-deck design, mechanically stripped hard silicon crystal integral liners, honed under simulated mechanical stress; die-forged steel crankshaft
cylinder heads & valvetrain
cast aluminium alloy; four valves per cylinder, 24 valves total, simplex chain-driven double overhead camshafts, continuously variable valve timing system both for intake and exhaust
fuel system & engine management
common-rail multi-point electronic sequential indirect fuel injection with six intake manifold-sited fuel injectors; Bosch Motronic ME 7.X electronic engine control unit (ECU)
exhaust system
two ceramic catalytic converters
DIN-rated motive power & torque output
130 kW (177 PS; 174 bhp) at 6,000 rpm (15.5 m/s piston speed); 230 N⋅m (170 lbf⋅ft) at 3,000–5,000 rpm; 12.1 bar (175 psi) (MEP)
application
Audi A6 (04/04–09/08)
references
"ID and data from ETKA".
"New Audi A6 in depth". WorldCarFans.com. Audi AG. 8 April 2004. Archived from the original on 29 July 2013.
"KS Aluminium-Technologie: engine blocks for the new Audi A6". Rheinmetall.de. Rheinmetall AG. August 2004. Archived from the original on 5 October 2012.
"ALUSIL – Cylinder Blocks for the new Audi V6 and V8 SI engines" (PDF). KSPG-AG.com. KS Aluminium-Technologie AG.

=== 2.6 V6 102–110 kW ===
identification
parts code prefix: ???
engine displacement & engine configuration
2,598 cc (158.5 cu in) 90° V6; bore × stroke: 82.5 mm × 81.0 mm (3.25 in × 3.19 in), stroke ratio: 1.02:1 – square engine, 433.0 cc per cylinder, compression ratio: 10.3:1
cylinder block & crankcase
grey cast iron; four main bearings, die-forged steel crankshaft
cylinder heads & valvetrain
cast aluminium alloy; two valves per cylinder each with two concentric valve springs, 12 valves total, timing-belt-driven single overhead camshaft
aspiration
cast aluminium alloy intake manifold, two-stage dual-barrel throttle valve
fuel system, ignition system & engine management
common-rail multi-point electronic sequential indirect fuel injection with six intake manifold-sited fuel injectors; one LAZ pre-power output stage control unit and one 6-way ignition coil with longlife spark plugs; Bosch MPFI electronic engine control unit (ECU); 95 RON/ROZ(91 AKI) EuroPremium (regular) unleaded recommended for optimum performance and fuel economy
DIN-rated motive power & torque outputs, ID codes
102 kW (139 PS; 137 bhp) — ACZ, Chinese market
110 kW (150 PS; 148 bhp) at 5,750 rpm; 225 N⋅m (166 lbf⋅ft) at 3,000 rpm — ABC
applications
Audi 80 (ABC: 07/92–07/95), Audi Coupé (ABC: 08/92–12/95), Audi Cabriolet (ABC: 01/94–08/00), Audi 100 (ABC: 03/92–07/94), Audi A4 (ABC: 11/94–07/98), Audi A6 (ABC: 06/94–10/97)
notes
"ID and data from ETKA".

=== 2.7 V6 30v T 169–195 kW ===
identification
parts code prefix: 078
engine displacement & engine configuration
2,671 cc (163.0 cu in) 90° V6; bore × stroke: 81.0 mm × 86.4 mm (3.19 in × 3.40 in), stroke ratio: 0.94:1 – under-square/long-stroke, 445.2 cc per cylinder, compression ratio: 9.0–9.9:1
cylinder block & crankcase
grey cast iron; four main bearings, die-forged steel crankshaft
cylinder heads & valvetrain
cast aluminium alloy; five valves per cylinder, 30 valves total, timing belt and simplex chain-driven (hybrid system) double overhead camshafts
aspiration
biturbo: two parallel turbochargers (one per cylinder bank), two side-mounted intercoolers
fuel system, ignition system & engine management
common-rail multi-point electronic sequential indirect fuel injection with six intake manifold-sited Siemens fuel injectors; six individual spark coils; Bosch Motronic ME 7.1 electronic engine control unit (ECU); 98 RON/ROZ(93 AKI) EuroSuperPlus (premium) unleaded recommended for maximum performance and fuel economy
DIN-rated motive power & torque outputs, applications, ID codes
169 kW (230 PS; 227 bhp) at 5,800 rpm; 310 N⋅m (229 lbf⋅ft) at 1,750 rpm — Audi C5 A6 (AJK)
184 kW (250 PS; 247 bhp) at 5,800 rpm; 350 N⋅m (258 lbf⋅ft) at 1,800 rpm — Audi C5 A6 allroad (ARE, BEL, BES)
187 kW (254 PS; 251 bhp) at 5,800 rpm; 350 N⋅m (258 lbf⋅ft) at 1,800 rpm — Audi B5 S4 (APB North American market)
195 kW (265 PS; 261 bhp) at 5,800 rpm; 400 N⋅m (295 lbf⋅ft) at 1,850 rpm — Audi B5 S4 (AGB, AZB)

=== 2.7 V6 30v T 280 kW (B5 RS4) ===
Based on the Audi B5 S4 2.7 V6 biturbo, this engine was tuned by Cosworth Technology (now MAHLE Powertrain), and featured enlarged intake and exhaust ports on the cylinder heads, two uprated parallel turbochargers, and two side-mounted intercoolers (SMICs), together with new induction and exhaust systems, and a re-calibrated engine management system. Due to the high performance nature of the vehicle, it was also fitted with a multi-baffled two-section oil sump to help prevent oil starvation during high g-force manoeuvres.

identification
parts code prefix: ???; ID codes: ASJ (EU2 compliant), AZR (EU3 compliant)
engine displacement & engine configuration
2,671 cc (163.0 cu in) 90° V6; bore × stroke: 81.0 mm × 86.4 mm (3.19 in × 3.40 in), stroke ratio: 0.94:1 – under-square/long-stroke, 445.2 cc per cylinder, compression ratio: 9.0–9.2:1
cylinder block & crankcase
grey cast iron; four main bearings, die-forged steel crankshaft
cylinder heads & valvetrain
cast aluminium alloy; five valves per cylinder, 30 valves total, timing belt and simplex roller chain-driven (hybrid system) double overhead camshafts
aspiration
biturbo: two parallel turbochargers (one per cylinder bank), two side-mounted intercoolers (SMICs)
fuel system, ignition system & engine management
common-rail multi-point electronic sequential indirect fuel injection with six intake manifold-sited fuel Siemens fuel injectors, six individual spark coils, Bosch Motronic ME 7.1 electronic engine control unit (ECU); 98 RON/ROZ(93 AKI) EuroSuperPlus (premium) unleaded recommended for maximum performance and fuel economy
DIN-rated motive power & torque output
280 kW (381 PS; 375 bhp) at 7,000 rpm; 440 N⋅m (325 lbf⋅ft) at 2,500–6,000 rpm
application
Audi B5 RS4 (ASJ: 06/00–10/00, AZR: 11/00–09/01)
notes
"ID and data from ETKA".

=== 2.8 V6 128 kW ===
identification
parts code prefix: ???; ID codes: AAH, AFC
engine displacement & engine configuration
2,771 cc (169.1 cu in) 90° V6; bore × stroke: 82.5 mm × 86.4 mm (3.25 in × 3.40 in), stroke ratio: 0.95:1 – under-square/long-stroke, 461.9 cc per cylinder, compression ratio: 10.3:1 (AFC 10.0:1)
cylinder block & crankcase
grey cast iron; four main bearings, die-forged steel crankshaft, two-part cast aluminium alloy oil sump
cylinder heads & valvetrain
cast aluminium alloy; two valves per cylinder each with two concentric valve springs (AFC has a single valve spring design), 12 valves total, self-adjusting hydraulic valve-play compensation, timing-belt-driven single overhead camshafts
aspiration
hot-film mass airflow meter (MAF), two-stage dual-barrel throttle valve, two-part cast aluminium alloy variable length intake manifold (380 mm short path, 780 mm long path)
fuel system, ignition system & engine management
common-rail multi-point electronic sequential indirect fuel injection with six intake manifold-sited fuel injectors; one LAZ pre-power output stage control unit and one 6-way ignition coil with longlife spark plugs; Bosch MMS MPI electronic engine control unit (ECU) with cylinder-selective knock control; 95 RON/ROZ(91 AKI) EuroPremium (regular) unleaded recommended for optimum performance and fuel economy
DIN-rated motive power & torque output
128 kW (174 PS; 172 bhp) at 5,500 rpm; 250 N⋅m (184 lbf⋅ft) at 3,000 rpm; redline: 6,700 rpm
updates from AAH to AFC
Valvetrain differences between original AAH design and later AFC design include

1) AFC camshaft provides different valve timing and is lighter. 2) AFC use single valve springs with less mass. 3) AFC inlet and exhaust valves have a smaller stem diameter with revised stem oil seals.

The AFC engine had a revised lubrication circuit and oil pan assembly, constructional detail includes

1) AFCs use a larger oil filter. 2) AFC engine oil cooler has a larger cross-sectional area. 3) AFC engines oil pressure relief valve is integrated into a cover assembly. 4) AFC engines oil pickup is integrated into the upper section of the oil sump, with a revised lower oil sump gasket.

applications
Audi 80 / Audi 90 (AAH: 09/91–07/95 {North America: 01/92–05/95, AFC: 07/93–07/95}), Audi Coupé (AAH: 08/91–12/95), Audi Cabriolet (AAH: 11/92–08/00 {North America: 11/93–07/94, AFC: 08/94–07/98}), Audi 100 (AAH: 12/90–07/94 {North America: 10/91–07/94}), Audi A4 (AAH: 11/94–07/97 {North America: 06/94–07/95, AFC: 07/95–07/97}), Audi A6 (AAH: 06/94–10/97 {North America: 06/94–07/95}, AFC: 08/94–06/95 {North America: 08/94–10/97}), Audi A8 (AAH: 06/94–03/96)
references
"ID and data from ETKA".
"Features of the 2.8 engine". 12v.org.

=== 2.8 VR6 103–130 kW ===
identification
parts code prefix: 021
engine displacement & engine configuration
2,792 cc (170.4 cu in) 15° VR6 engine; bore × stroke: 81.0 mm × 90.3 mm (3.19 in × 3.56 in), stroke ratio: 0.90:1 – under-square/long-stroke, 465.3 cc per cylinder, compression ratio: 10.5:1
cylinder block & crankcase
grey cast iron; seven main bearings, die-forged steel crankshaft
cylinder head & valvetrain
cast aluminium alloy; two valves per cylinder, 12 valves total, double overhead camshafts (DOHC)
fuel system & engine management
multi-point electronic sequential indirect fuel injection with six intake manifold-sited fuel injectors; Bosch Motronic M2.7/M2.9/M3.8.1 ME 7.1 electronic engine control unit (ECU); 98 RON/ROZ(95 AKI) EuroPremium (regular) unleaded recommended for optimum performance and fuel economy
DIN-rated motive power & torque outputs, ID codes
103 kW (140 PS; 138 bhp) — AES VW Eurovan (05/96–05/00 – North America only)
128 kW (174 PS; 172 bhp) at 5,800 rpm; 235 N⋅m (173 lbf⋅ft) at 4,200 rpm — AAA
130 kW (177 PS; 174 bhp) — AFP
applications
Volkswagen Corrado, Volkswagen Golf Mk3, Volkswagen Golf Mk4, Volkswagen Jetta (AAA, AFP), Volkswagen Passat (AAA), Volkswagen Sharan, Volkswagen Transporter (T4), Ford Galaxy, Mercedes-Benz Vito

==== Awards ====
was placed in the 1995 annual list of Ward's 10 Best Engines

=== 2.8 V6 30v 137–142 kW ===
identification
parts code prefix: 078; ID code: ACK, AGE, AHA, ALG, AMX, APR, AQD, ATQ, ATX, BBG
engine displacement & engine configuration
2,771 cc (169.1 cu in) 90° V6; bore × stroke: 82.5 mm × 86.4 mm (3.25 in × 3.40 in), stroke ratio: 0.95:1 – under-square/long-stroke, 461.9 cc per cylinder, compression ratio: 10.1:1 (AGE, ATX, BBG); 10.3:1 (ALG, AMX), 10.6:1 (ACK, AHA, APR, AQD, ATQ)
cylinder block & crankcase
grey cast iron; four main bearings, die-forged steel crankshaft
cylinder heads & valvetrain
cast aluminium alloy; five valves per cylinder, 30 valves total, timing belt and simplex roller chain-driven (hybrid system) double overhead camshafts
aspiration
cast aluminium alloy two-position variable intake manifold
fuel system & engine management
multi-point electronic sequential indirect fuel injection with six intake manifold-sited fuel injectors; Bosch Motronic electronic engine control unit (ECU); 98 RON/ROZ(93 AKI) EuroSuperPlus (premium) unleaded recommended for optimum performance and fuel economy (ACK, AHA, ALG, AMX, APR, AQD, ATQ); 95 RON/ROZ(91 AKI) EuroPremium (regular) unleaded allowed (AGE, ATX, BBG)
DIN-rated motive power & torque output, ID codes
137 kW (186 PS; 184 bhp) at 6,000 rpm; 260 N⋅m (190 lb⋅ft) at 3,200 rpm — AGE
140 kW (190 PS; 188 bhp) at 6,000 rpm; 260 N⋅m (190 lb⋅ft) at 3,200 rpm — ATX, BBG
142 kW (193 PS; 190 bhp) at 6,000 rpm; 280 N⋅m (210 lb⋅ft) at 3,200 rpm — ALG, AMX
142 kW (193 PS; 190 bhp) at 6,000 rpm; 300 N⋅m (220 lb⋅ft) at 3,200 rpm — ACK, AHA, APR, AQD, ATQ
applications
Audi B5 A4 (03/96–12/98), Audi A6 (10/95–01/99), Audi D2 A8 (07/95–01/99), VW Passat B5 & B5.5 (1997–2005), Škoda Superb (12/2001–08/2006)
notes
"ID and data from ETKA".

=== 2.8 V6 24v FSI ===
The 2.8 V6 is a stroke-reduced version of the 3.2 V6 FSI introducing the Audi valvelift variable control of inlet valve lift.

identification
parts code prefix: ???, ID code: BDX
engine displacement & engine configuration
2,773 cc (169.2 cu in) 90° V6 engine, 18.5 mm (0.73 in) cylinders banks offset; bore × stroke: 84.5 mm × 82.4 mm (3.33 in × 3.24 in), stroke ratio: 1.03:1 – over-square/short-stroke, 462.1 cc per cylinder, compression ratio: 12.0:1
cylinder block & crankcase
homogeneous monoblock low-pressure gravity die cast hypereutectic Alusil aluminium-silicon alloy (AlSi17Cu4Mg) with a closed-deck design, mechanically stripped hard silicon crystal integral liners, honed under simulated mechanical stress; 360 mm (14.2 in) long, 430 mm (16.9 in) wide, 228 mm (9.0 in) high, 33 kg (73 lb); die-forged steel crankshaft
cylinder heads & valvetrain
cast aluminium alloy; four valves per cylinder, 24 valves total, low-friction roller finger cam followers with automatic hydraulic valve clearance compensation, chain-driven double overhead camshafts, continuously adjusting variable valve timing for intake and exhaust camshafts, two-stage valvelift inlet valve lift variable control
fuel system
common-rail Fuel Stratified Injection (FSI) high-pressure direct injection
dimensions
165 kg (364 lb)
DIN-rated motive power & torque output
140 kW (190 PS; 188 bhp) at 5,500 rpm; 280 N⋅m (207 lbf⋅ft) at 3,000–5,000 rpm
150 kW (204 PS; 201 bhp) at 5,250 rpm; 280 N⋅m (207 lbf⋅ft) at 3,000–5,000 rpm
154 kW (209 PS; 207 bhp) at 5,500 rpm; 280 N⋅m (207 lbf⋅ft) at 3,000–5,000 rpm; 6,800 rpm max
162 kW (220 PS; 217 bhp) at 5,750 rpm; 280 N⋅m (207 lbf⋅ft) at 3,200–5,000 rpm
applications
C6/C7 Audi A6, C7 Audi A7, D3 Audi A8
reference
"KS Aluminium-Technologie: engine blocks for the new Audi A6". Rheinmetall.de. Rheinmetall AG. August 2004. Archived from the original on 5 October 2012.
"ALUSIL – Cylinder Blocks for the new Audi V6 and V8 SI engines" (PDF). KSPG-AG.com. KS Aluminium-Technologie AG.
"The new 2.8 FSI with Audi Valvelift system" (Press release). Audi AG. 27 September 2006.

=== 2.8 VR6 24v 147–150 kW ===
identification
parts code prefix: 022; ID codes: AQP, AUE, AXK (USA), AYL, BDE, BDF (USA)
engine displacement & engine configuration
2,792 cc (170.4 cu in) 15° VR6; bore × stroke: 81.0 mm × 90.3 mm (3.19 in × 3.56 in), stroke ratio: 0.90:1 – under-square/long-stroke, 465.3 cc per cylinder, compression ratio: 10.7:1
cylinder block & crankcase
grey cast iron; seven main bearings, die-forged steel crankshaft
cylinder head & valvetrain
cast aluminium alloy; four unequal-length valves per cylinder, 24 valves total, double overhead camshafts (DOHC)
fuel system & engine management
multi-point electronic sequential indirect fuel injection with six intake manifold-sited fuel injectors; Bosch Motronic ME 7.1 electronic engine control unit (ECU); 95 RON/ROZ(91 AKI) EuroPremium (regular) unleaded recommended for optimum performance and fuel economy
DIN-rated motive power & torque outputs, ID codes
147 kW (200 PS; 197 bhp) — BDF, USA-only, Jetta (10/01–06/04), Golf (03/02->)
150 kW (204 PS; 201 bhp) at 6,200 rpm; 245 N⋅m (181 lbf⋅ft) at 2,400–5,500 rpm — AXK, USA-only VW Eurovan (05/00–06/03)
150 kW (204 PS; 201 bhp) at 6,200 rpm; 265 N⋅m (195 lbf⋅ft) at 3,400 rpm
applications
Volkswagen Golf Mk4 (AUE: 01/00–04/01), VW Bora (AUE: 03/00–04/01), SEAT León 1M Cupra 4 (AUE: 10/00–07/01, BDE: 06/01–04/04), SEAT Alhambra (AUE: 06/00–04/02, AYL: 06/00->), Volkswagen Sharan (AYL: 04/00–05/08)
notes
"ID and data from ETKA".

=== 2.9 VR6 140 kW ===
identification
parts code prefix: 021; ID codes: ABV
engine displacement & engine configuration
2,861 cc (174.6 cu in) 15° VR6; bore × stroke: 82.0 mm × 90.3 mm (3.23 in × 3.56 in)
cylinder block & crankcase
grey cast iron; seven main bearings, die-forged steel crankshaft
cylinder head & valvetrain
cast aluminium alloy; two valves per cylinder, 12 valves total, duplex chain-driven double overhead camshafts (DOHC)
fuel system & engine management
common-rail multi-point electronic sequential indirect fuel injection with six intake manifold-sited fuel injectors; Bosch Motronic M 2.9 electronic engine control unit (ECU); 98 RON/ROZ(95 AKI) EuroPremium (regular) unleaded recommended for optimum performance and fuel economy
DIN-rated motive power & torque outputs, applications
135 kW (184 PS; 181 bhp) — VW Passat B4 VR6 (10/94–12/96)
140 kW (190 PS; 188 bhp) at 5,800 rpm; 245 N⋅m (181 lbf⋅ft) at 4,200 rpm — Volkswagen Corrado VR6 (08/91–07/95), VW Golf Mk3 VR6 (10/94–12/97)
notes
"ID and data from ETKA".

=== 3.0 V6 30v ===
This engine unveiled in 2000 is an all-aluminium alloy, longer stroke version of the 2.8 V6.

identification
parts code prefix: 06C
engine displacement & engine configuration
2,976 cc (181.6 cu in) 90° V6 engine; bore × stroke: 82.5 mm × 92.8 mm (3.25 in × 3.65 in), stroke ratio: 0.89:1 – under-square/long-stroke, 496.1 cc per cylinder, compression ratio: 10.5:1
cylinder block & crankcase
cast aluminium alloy; die-forged steel crankshaft; light pistons, balancer shaft
cylinder heads & valvetrain
cast aluminium alloy; five valves per cylinder, 30 valves total, hydraulic bucket tappets with automatic valve clearance compensation, belt-driven double overhead camshafts, continuously adjusting variable valve timing for intake and exhaust camshafts
aspiration
two-position variable length intake manifold
engine management
Bosch Motronic ME 7.1.1 with electronic throttle control, EU4 compliant
DIN-rated motive power & torque outputs, ID codes
BBJ: 160 kW (218 PS; 215 bhp) for the C6 A6
AVK: 162 kW (220 PS; 217 bhp) at 6,300 rpm; 300 N⋅m (221 lbf⋅ft) at 3,200 rpm
applications
2002–2005 Audi A4, 2002–2004 Audi A6, 2005 Audi A6 (some Far East markets)
reference
"The New Audi A4" (Press release). Audi AG. 10 October 2000.

=== 3.0 V6 24v TFSI (EA837) ===
identification
parts code prefix: 06E, ID codes: CAJA, CAKA, CCBA, CMUA
engine displacement & engine configuration
2,995 cc (182.8 cu in) 90° V6 engine; bore × stroke: 84.5 mm × 89 mm (3.33 in × 3.50 in), stroke ratio: 0.95:1 – under-square/long-stroke, 499.7 cc per cylinder, 90 mm (3.54 in) cylinder spacing, compression ratio: 10.3:1
cylinder block & crankcase
cast aluminium alloy; die-forged steel crossplane crankshaft
cylinder heads & valvetrain
cast aluminium alloy; four valves per cylinder, 24 valves total, low-friction roller finger cam followers with automatic hydraulic valve clearance compensation, chain-driven double overhead camshafts, continuously adjusting variable valve timing for intake and exhaust camshafts
aspiration
Eaton Twin Vortices Series (TVS) Roots-type positive displacement supercharger compressor with 160-degree axial twist twin four-lobe rotors and two integrated water-cooled charge air coolers (one per cylinder bank), mounted within the Vee pumping charged air directly into the inlet manifold
fuel system
fully demand-controlled and returnless; fuel tank–mounted low-pressure fuel pump; Fuel Stratified Injection (FSI): two-inlet double-cam–driven single-piston high-pressure injection pumps maintaining a pressure of 30 to 100 bar (435 to 1,450 psi) in the two stainless steel common fuel distribution rails (one rail per cylinder bank), six combustion chamber sited direct injection solenoid-controlled sequential fuel injectors, homogenous mixing, stratified-charge combustion (lean-burn) at partial load
ignition system and engine management
mapped direct ignition with centrally mounted spark plugs and six individual direct-acting single spark coils; Siemens Simos 8.xx electronic engine control unit (ECU)
exhaust system
two ceramic catalytic converters
dimensions
length: 360 mm (14.2 in), width: 430 mm (16.9 in), mass: 189 kg (417 lb)
DIN-rated motive power & torque outputs
200 kW (272 PS; 268 bhp) at 4,780–6,500 rpm; 400 N⋅m (295 lbf⋅ft) at 2,150–4,780 rpm — CMUA: Audi A4, Audi A5, Audi Q5
213 kW (290 PS; 286 bhp) at 4,850–6,500 rpm; 420 N⋅m (310 lbf⋅ft) at 2,500–4,800 rpm — CAJA: Audi A6 (C6)
245 kW (333 PS; 329 bhp) at 5,500–7,000 rpm; 440 N⋅m (325 lbf⋅ft) at 2,500–5,000 rpm — CAKA/CCBA: Audi S4 (B8), Audi S5, Audi Q7 (4M)
260 kW (354 PS; 349 bhp) at 6,000–6,500 rpm; 470 N⋅m (347 lbf⋅ft) at 4,000–4,500 rpm — CTXA: Audi SQ5#B8(8R),
applications
2009 Audi A8 (D3), Audi A6 (C6), Audi A6 (C7), Audi A7 (C7), Audi A4 (B8), Audi S5, Audi S4 (B8), 2010 VW Touareg Hybrid, 2011-2015 Porsche Cayenne S Hybrid, 2015–2019 Audi Q7 (4M), 2013 Audi SQ5#(8R/B8), 2016 Volkswagen Phideon
references
Parks, Jim (17 July 2008). "Audi Selects Eaton TVS Supercharger To Power Fuel Efficient V6". Eaton.com. Eaton Corporation – press release. "when paired with direct injection and enhanced transmission ratio, the TVS supercharger helps the engine achieve 290 hp with an average fuel economy of nearly 24 miles per gallon"
Parks, Jim (6 November 2008). "Eaton TVS Supercharger Featured On 2010 Audi S4/S4 Avant". Eaton.com. Eaton Corporation – press release. "When combined with direct injection, the TVS surpasses twin turbochargers in packaging, starting performance and responsiveness"
Parks, Jim (4 March 2009). "First Hybrid Application Of TVS Supercharger To Appear On 2010 Volkswagen Touareg; Fuel Economy Improved 17- 25 Percent". Eaton.com. Eaton Corporation – press release. Archived from the original on 29 September 2009.

=== 3.2 VR6 24v (EA390) ===
This VR6 engine was often badged as a "V6" in Audi models

identification
parts code prefix: 022, ID codes: CBRA
engine displacement & engine configuration
3,189 cc (194.6 cu in) 15° VR6 engine; bore × stroke: 84.0 mm × 95.9 mm (3.31 in × 3.78 in), stroke ratio: 0.88:1 – under-square/long-stroke, 531.5 cc per cylinder, compression ratio: 11.3:1
cylinder block & crankcase
grey cast iron; seven main bearings; die-forged steel crankshaft, cast aluminium alloy oil sump
cylinder head & valvetrain
cast aluminium alloy; four unequal-length valves per cylinder, 24 valves total, low-friction roller finger cam followers with automatic hydraulic valve clearance compensation, simplex roller chain-driven double overhead camshafts (DOHC – one camshaft for all exhaust valves, and one for all intake valves), continuous timing adjustment variable valve timing (52 degrees on the inlet, 22 degrees on the exhaust)
aspiration
hot-film air mass meter, electronic drive by wire throttle valve, one piece plastic with variable runner length switching by way of an ecu controlled valve intake manifold, two cast iron exhaust manifolds
fuel system, ignition system, engine management
common-rail multi-point electronic sequential indirect fuel injection with six intake manifold-sited fuel injectors; mapped direct ignition with six NGK longlife spark plugs and six individual single spark coils; electronic engine control unit (ECU)
EWG-rated motive power, ID code & application
54 kW (73 PS; 72 bhp) — BMF — Volkswagen Industrial Motor (LPG) (05/04->)
DIN-rated motive power & torque outputs, ID codes & applications
170 kW (231 PS; 228 bhp) at 6,200 rpm; 315 N⋅m (232 lbf⋅ft) at 3,200 rpm — BDL — Volkswagen Transporter (T5)
173 kW (235 PS; 232 bhp) at 6,200 rpm; 315 N⋅m (232 lbf⋅ft) at 2,950 rpm — BKK — Volkswagen Transporter (T5)
177 kW (241 PS; 237 bhp) at 6,200 rpm; 320 N⋅m (236 lbf⋅ft) at 2,500–3,000 rpm — BFH — VW Golf Mk4 R32 (US)
177 kW (241 PS; 237 bhp) at 6,250 rpm; 320 N⋅m (236 lbf⋅ft) at 2,800–3,200 rpm — BML — VW Golf Mk4 R32 (Australia)
184 kW (250 PS; 247 bhp) at 6,300 rpm; 320 N⋅m (236 lbf⋅ft) at 2,500–3,000 rpm — BDB, BHE, BMJ, BPF, BUB — Audi A3 (BDB: 07/03–08/04, BMJ: 09/04–10/05, BUB: 11/05–05/09), Audi TT (BHE: 07/03–06/06, BPF: 05/04–05/06, BUB: 08/06–06/10), VW Golf Mk5 R32, VW Eos, Porsche Cayenne
references
"VW Golf R32 (Mk4) – in depth". WorldCarFans.com. Volkswagen AG. 7 August 2002. Archived from the original on 5 August 2009.
"The New Volkswagen Golf R32 (Mk4)". BillsWebSpace.com. Volkswagen Group Australia. February 2003.
"New Volkswagen Golf R32 (Mk5)". WorldCarFans.com. Volkswagen AG. 23 September 2005. Archived from the original on 11 July 2009.

=== 3.2 VR6 24v FSI (EA390) ===
identification
parts code prefix: 03H, ID code: AXZ
engine displacement & engine configuration
3,168 cc (193.3 cu in) 10.6° VR6 engine; bore: 86.0 mm (3.39 in) × stroke: 90.9mm, stroke ratio: 0.95:1 – under-square/long-stroke, 531.5 cc per cylinder, compression ratio: 12:1
cylinder block & crankcase
grey cast iron; seven main bearings; die-forged steel crankshaft
cylinder head & valvetrain
cast aluminium alloy; four unequal-length valves per cylinder, 24 valves total, low-friction roller finger cam followers with automatic hydraulic valve clearance compensation, simplex roller chain-driven double overhead camshafts (DOHC – one camshaft for all exhaust valves, and one for all intake valves), continuous timing adjustment variable valve timing (52 degrees on the inlet, 22 degrees on the exhaust)
aspiration
hot-film air mass meter, electronic drive by wire throttle valve, one-piece cast aluminium alloy intake manifold, two cast iron exhaust manifolds
fuel system
Fuel Stratified Injection (FSI) high-pressure direct injection with two common rails
ignition system
mapped direct ignition with six individual ignition coils
DIN-rated motive power & torque output
184 kW (250 PS; 247 bhp)
application
VW Passat B6 3.2 FSI (09/05->), VW Phaeton

=== 3.2 (Technically – 3.1 L) V6 24v FSI ===
identification
parts code prefix: ???, ID codes: AUK, BKH, BYU, (191 kW – BPK)
engine configuration
90° V6 engine; 90 mm (3.54 in) cylinder spacing, compression ratio: 12.5:1 (184 kW: 11.3:1)
engine displacement etc.
3,123 cc (190.6 cu in); bore × stroke: 84.5 mm × 92.8 mm (3.33 in × 3.65 in), stroke ratio: 0.91:1 – under-square/long-stroke, 520.4 cc per cylinder
3,197 cc (195.1 cu in); bore × stroke: 85.5 mm × 92.8 mm (3.37 in × 3.65 in), stroke ratio: 0.92:1 – under-square/long-stroke, 532.8 cc per cylinder
cylinder block & crankcase
homogeneous monoblock low-pressure chill gravity die cast hypereutectic Alusil aluminium-silicon alloy (AlSi17Cu4Mg) with a closed-deck design, mechanically stripped hard silicon crystal integral liners, honed under simulated mechanical stress; die-forged steel crankshaft
cylinder heads & valvetrain
cast aluminium alloy; four valves per cylinder, 24 valves total, low-friction roller finger cam followers with automatic hydraulic valve clearance compensation, chain-driven double overhead camshafts, continuously adjusting variable valve timing for intake and exhaust camshafts
fuel system
common-rail Fuel Stratified Injection (FSI) high-pressure direct injection between 30 and 100 bar (435 and 1,450 psi)
aspiration & exhaust system
variable intake manifold, two ceramic catalytic converters
dimensions
length: 360 mm (14.2 in), width: 430 mm (16.9 in), mass: 169.5 kg (374 lb)
DIN-rated motive power & torque outputs
184 kW (250 PS; 247 bhp) at 6,300 rpm; 320 N⋅m (236 lbf⋅ft) at 2,500–3,000 rpm
188 kW (256 PS; 252 bhp) at 6,500 rpm; 330 N⋅m (243 lbf⋅ft) at 3,250 rpm, 90% available between 1,900 and 5,900 rpm, 7,200 rpm max — Audi A6
191 kW (260 PS; 256 bhp) at 6,500 rpm — Audi A8
195 kW (265 PS; 261 bhp) at 6,500 rpm; 320 N⋅m (236 lbf⋅ft) at 3,200–5,000 rpm — Audi A4, Audi A5
applications
2005 Audi A8, Audi A6, Audi A4, Audi A5
references
"New Audi A6 in depth". WorldCarFans.com. Audi AG. 8 April 2004. Archived from the original on 29 July 2013.
"KS Aluminium-Technologie: engine blocks for the new Audi A6". Rheinmetall.de. Rheinmetall AG. August 2004. Archived from the original on 5 October 2012.
"ALUSIL – Cylinder Blocks for the new Audi V6 and V8 SI engines" (PDF). KSPG-AG.com. KS Aluminium-Technologie AG.

=== 3.6 VR6 24v FSI (EA390) ===
identification
parts code prefix: 03H
engine displacement & engine configuration
3,598 cc (219.6 cu in) 10.6° VR6 engine; bore × stroke: 89.0 mm × 96.4 mm (3.50 in × 3.80 in), stroke ratio: 0.92:1 – under-square/long-stroke, 599.7 cc per cylinder, compression ratio: 11.4–12.0:1
cylinder block & crankcase
grey cast iron; die-forged steel crankshaft
cylinder head & valvetrain
cast aluminium alloy; four unequal-length valves per cylinder, 24 valves total, low-friction roller finger cam followers with automatic hydraulic valve clearance compensation, simplex roller chain-driven double overhead camshafts (DOHC – one camshaft for all exhaust valves, and one for all intake valves), continuous timing adjustment variable valve timing (52 degrees on the inlet, 22 degrees on the exhaust)
aspiration
hot-film air mass meter, electronic drive by wire throttle valve, two-piece cast aluminium alloy intake manifold, two cast iron exhaust manifolds
fuel system
Fuel Stratified Injection (FSI) high-pressure direct injection with two common rails
DIN-rated motive power & torque outputs, ID codes
191 kW (260 PS; 256 bhp) at 6,000 rpm; 350 N⋅m (258 lbf⋅ft) at 2,500–5000 rpm; Compression Ratio: 11.4:1 — CDVA — Škoda Superb 4x4 DSG and Volkswagen Eos 3.6
206 kW (280 PS; 276 bhp) at 6,200 rpm; 360 N⋅m (266 lbf⋅ft) at 2,750 rpm; — BLV — Volkswagen Passat (B6 and B7) (North America and Middle-East only)
206 kW (280 PS; 276 bhp) at 6,200 rpm; 350 N⋅m (258 lbf⋅ft) at 2,500–5000 rpm; — CDVB — Volkswagen Passat (NMS) (North America and Middle-East only)
206 kW (280 PS; 276 bhp) at 6,200 rpm; 350 N⋅m (258 lbf⋅ft) at 2,500–5000 rpm; — CDVC/CDVD — Volkswagen Atlas (North America, Russia and Middle-East)
206 kW (280 PS; 276 bhp) at 6,200 rpm; 370 N⋅m (273 lbf⋅ft) at 3,500 rpm; — CHNA/CMVA — Volkswagen Phaeton
206 kW (280 PS; 276 bhp) at 6,200 rpm; 370 N⋅m (273 lbf⋅ft) at 3,500 rpm; — CGRA/CMTA — Volkswagen Touareg
206 kW (280 PS; 276 bhp) at 6,200 rpm; 360 N⋅m (266 lbf⋅ft) at 2,800 rpm; — CNNA — Volkswagen CC (North America, Russia and Middle-East)
220 kW (299 PS; 295 bhp) at 6,600 rpm; 350 N⋅m (258 lbf⋅ft) at 2,400–5,300 rpm — BWS — Volkswagen Passat R36 (B6) (Europe, Japan, Australia, New Zealand, Middle-East)
applications
VW Passat B6 3.6 FSI (BLV: 09/05->, BWS: 04/07–05/07), VW Passat CC (BLV: 06/08->, BWS: 05/08->, CNNA: 01/12->), VW Phaeton, VW Touareg, VW Eos, Porsche Cayenne, Audi Q7
references
"Volkswagen Passat 3.6". Car and Driver. December 2005. Archived from the original on 29 September 2007.
"Volkswagen Passat R36 technical specifications". Car Enthusiast.

== Eight-cylinder ==
All Volkswagen Group V8 and W8 petrol engines are constructed from a lightweight, cast aluminium alloy cylinder block (crankcase) and cylinder heads. They all use multi-valve technology, with the valves being operated by two overhead camshafts per cylinder bank (sometimes referred to as quad cam). All functions of engine control are carried out by varying types of Robert Bosch GmbH Motronic electronic engine control units. They are all longitudinally front-mounted, and the V8 engines listed below were for a long time only used in cars bearing the Audi marque, but latterly being installed in Volkswagen Passenger Cars flagship Volkswagen Phaeton.

=== 3.6 V8 32v 184 kW ===
identification
parts code prefix: 077, ID code: PT
engine displacement & engine configuration
3,562 cc (217.4 cu in) 90° V8; bore × stroke: 81.0 mm × 86.4 mm (3.19 in × 3.40 in), stroke ratio: 0.94:1 – under-square/long-stroke, 445.2 cc per cylinder; compression ratio: 10.6:1
cylinder block & crankcase
cast aluminium alloy; five main bearings, die-forged steel crankshaft
cylinder heads & valvetrain
cast aluminium alloy; four valves per cylinder, 32 valves total, timing belt and simplex chain-driven (hybrid system) double overhead camshafts
fuel system, ignition system, engine management
common-rail multi-point electronic sequential indirect fuel injection with eight intake manifold-sited fuel injectors; twin Hitachi ignition coils (one per cylinder bank) with Bosch longlife spark plugs, Bosch Motronic electronic engine control unit (ECU); 95 RON/ROZ(91 AKI) EuroPremium (regular) unleaded recommended for optimum performance and fuel economy
DIN-rated motive power & torque output
184 kW (250 PS; 247 bhp) at 5,800 rpm; 340 N⋅m (251 lbf⋅ft) at 4,000 rpm
application
Audi V8 (10/88–11/93) "ID and data from ETKA".
reference
"Audi V8 3.6 (1988–1994)". TopCarGuide.com. Archived from the original on 17 July 2011.
"Audi V8 (D11/4C) – Technische Daten". Motor Klassik (in German). Motor Presse Netzwerk.
"Der Motor (The Engine)". AudiV8.com (in German). 1 November 2008.

=== 3.7 V8 32v 169 kW ===
identification
parts code prefix: 077, ID codes: AEW, AKJ
engine displacement & engine configuration
3,697 cc (225.6 cu in) 90° V8; bore × stroke: 84.5 mm × 82.4 mm (3.33 in × 3.24 in), stroke ratio: 1.03:1 – over-square/short-stroke, 462.1 cc per cylinder; compression ratio: 10.8:1
cylinder block & crankcase
cast aluminium alloy; five main bearings, die-forged steel crankshaft
cylinder heads & valvetrain
cast aluminium alloy; four valves per cylinder, 32 valves total, timing belt and simplex chain-driven (hybrid system) double overhead camshafts
fuel system, ignition system, engine management
common-rail multi-point electronic sequential indirect fuel injection with eight intake manifold-sited fuel injectors; twin LAZ pre-power output stage control units (one per cylinder bank) and eight single spark ignition coils with Bosch longlife spark plugs, Bosch Motronic electronic engine control unit (ECU); 95 RON/ROZ(91 AKI) EuroPremium (regular) unleaded recommended for optimum performance and fuel economy
DIN-rated motive power & torque output
169 kW (230 PS; 227 bhp) at 5,500 rpm; 315 N⋅m (232 lbf⋅ft) at 2,700 rpm
application
Audi D2 A8 (AEW: 07/95–12/98, AKJ: 06/97–12/98) "ID and data from ETKA".
reference
"Audi A8 3.7 (1995–2002)". TopCarGuide.com.

=== 3.7 V8 40v 191–206 kW ===
identification
parts code prefix: 077
engine displacement & engine configuration
3,697 cc (225.6 cu in) 90° V8; bore × stroke: 84.5 mm × 82.4 mm (3.33 in × 3.24 in), stroke ratio: 1.03:1 – over-square/short-stroke, 462.1 cc per cylinder; compression ratio: 11.0:1 (BFL: 11.3:1)
cylinder block & crankcase
cast aluminium alloy; five main bearings, die-forged steel crankshaft
cylinder heads & valvetrain
cast aluminium alloy; five valves per cylinder, 40 valves total, low friction roller rocker fingers, timing belt and simplex chain-driven (hybrid system) hollow double overhead camshafts, variable inlet camshaft timing
aspiration
3-stage variable composite intake manifold
fuel system, ignition system, engine management
common-rail multi-point electronic sequential indirect fuel injection with eight intake manifold-sited fuel injectors; eight single spark ignition coils with Bosch longlife spark plugs, Bosch Motronic electronic engine control unit (ECU); 95 RON/ROZ(91 AKI) EuroPremium (regular) unleaded recommended for optimum performance and fuel economy
DIN-rated motive power & torque outputs, ID codes
191 kW (260 PS; 256 bhp) at 6,000 rpm; 350 N⋅m (258 lbf⋅ft) at 3,250 rpm — AQG, AKC
206 kW (280 PS; 276 bhp) at 6,000 rpm; 360 N⋅m (266 lbf⋅ft) at 3,750 rpm — BFL
applications
Audi D2 A8 (AQG: 10/98–02/01, AKC: 05/00–09/02), Audi D3 A8 (BFL: 11/02–05/06) "ID and data from ETKA".
references
"Audi A8 3.7 40v (1998–2002)". TopCarGuide.com.
"Audi A8 3.7 quattro (2002–...)". TopCarGuide.com.

=== 4.0 WR8 32v 202 kW ===
The W8-badged engine is an eight-cylinder W engine of four banks of two cylinders, formed by joining two 15° VR4 engines, placed on a single crankshaft, with each cylinder double bank now at a 72° vee angle.

identification
parts code prefix: 07D, ID codes: BDN (09/01–09/04), BDP (05/02–09/04)
engine displacement & engine configuration
3,998.94 cc (244.0 cu in) 72° WR8 engine; bore × stroke: 84.0 mm × 90.2 mm (3.31 in × 3.55 in), stroke ratio: 0.93:1 – under-square/long-stroke, 499.87 cc per cylinder, compression ratio: 10.8:1
cylinder block & crankcase
cast aluminium alloy with two-part cast aluminium alloy oil sump; five main bearings; die-forged steel crankshaft with split crankpins; Lanchester principle balance shafts one above the other, counter-rotating at twice the crankshaft speed, symmetric to the middle of the crankshaft, upper one driven by a toothed belt
cylinder heads & valvetrain
cast aluminium alloy; four unequal-length valves per cylinder, 32 valves total, low-friction roller finger cam followers with automatic hydraulic valve clearance compensation, simplex roller chain-driven (relay method, using three chains) double overhead camshafts, continuous vane-adjustable variable valve timing for intake and exhaust camshafts with up to 52° variance inlet camshafts and 22° for exhaust camshafts
aspiration
hot-film air mass meter, single throttle body with electronically controlled Bosch E-Gas drive by wire throttle butterfly valve, four-part, two-channel cast aluminium resonance intake manifold
fuel system, ignition system, engine management
two linked common fuel distribution rails, multi-point electronic sequential indirect fuel injection with eight intake manifold-sited fuel injectors; centrally positioned NGK longlife spark plugs, mapped direct ignition with eight individual direct-acting single spark coils; Bosch Motronic ME electronic engine control unit (ECU), cylinder-selective knock control via four knock sensors, permanent lambda control; 95 RON/ROZ(91 AKI) EuroSuperPlus (premium) unleaded recommended for maximum performance and fuel economy
exhaust system
vacuum-operated secondary air injection pump for direct injection into exhaust ports to assist cold start operation, one cast iron exhaust manifold per cylinder bank with integrated ceramic catalytic converter per cylinder bank, four heated oxygen sensors monitoring pre- and post catalyst exhaust gasses, EU4 compliant
dimensions
mass: 190 kg (419 lb), length: 420 mm (16.5 in) length, width: 710 mm (28.0 in), height: 683 mm (26.9 in)
DIN-rated motive power & torque output
202 kW (275 PS; 271 bhp) at 6,000 rpm; 370 N⋅m (273 lbf⋅ft) at 2,750 rpm (11.6 bar (168 psi) MEP); max. engine speed: 6,400 rpm (19.2 m/s)
application
Volkswagen Passat B5.5 W8 4motion
references
"Volkswagen Passat W8 4motion – spec sheet" (PDF). CarAndDriver.com. Hachette Filipacchi Media U.S., Inc.
"2002 Volkswagen Passat W8". AutoWeek.com. Crain Communications, Inc. 21 August 2001. Archived from the original on 19 January 2011.
"Volkswagen Passat W8". evo. Dennis Publishing Ltd. March 2002. Archived from the original on 1 September 2010.
"VW Passat W8 4motion". WorldCarFans.com. Volkswagen AG. 22 April 2002. Archived from the original on 20 April 2013.
"W8 voted best technical innovation at the Moscow Motor Show". WorldCarFans.com. Volkswagen AG. 2 December 2001.

==== Awards ====
was voted best technical innovation and awarded the Golden Pegasus by Za ruljom at the Moscow Motor Show

=== 4.2 V8 32v 206–250 kW ===
identification
parts code prefix: 0215

engine displacement & engine configuration
4,172 cc (254.6 cu in) 90° V8; bore × stroke: 84.5 mm × 93.0 mm (3.33 in × 3.66 in), stroke ratio: 0.91:1 – under-square/long-stroke, 521.5 cc per cylinder; compression ratio: 10.3:1 (ABH: 10.8:1)
cylinder block & crankcase
cast aluminium alloy; five main bearings, die-forged steel crankshaft
cylinder heads & valvetrain
cast aluminium alloy; four valves per cylinder, 32 valves total, timing belt and simplex chain-driven (hybrid system) double overhead camshafts
fuel system, ignition system, engine management
common-rail multi-point electronic sequential indirect fuel injection with eight intake manifold-sited fuel injectors; Bosch Motronic electronic engine control unit (ECU); 98 RON/ROZ(93 AKI) EuroSuperPlus (premium) unleaded recommended for maximum performance and fuel economy
dimensions
mass: 208 to 211 kg (459 to 465 lb) depending on variant
DIN-rated motive power & torque outputs, ID codes
206 kW (280 PS; 276 bhp) at 5,800 rpm; 400 N⋅m (295 lbf⋅ft) at 4,000 rpm — ABH
213 kW (290 PS; 286 bhp) at 5,900 rpm; 400 N⋅m (295 lbf⋅ft) at 4,000 rpm — AEC
221 kW (300 PS; 296 bhp) at 6,000 rpm; 400 N⋅m (295 lbf⋅ft) at 3,000 rpm — ABZ, AKG, ARS, ASG
240 kW (326 PS; 322 bhp) at 6,600 rpm; 410 N⋅m (302 lbf⋅ft) at 3,500 rpm — AHK
250 kW (340 PS; 335 bhp) at 6,600 rpm; 420 N⋅m (310 lbf⋅ft) at 3,500 rpm — AHC, AKH, AQJ
applications
Audi V8 (ABH: 08/91–11/99), Audi C4 S4 (ABH: 10/92–07/94), Audi C4 S6 (AEC: 09/94–10/97), Audi C5 A6 (ARS: 04/99–05/01, ASG: 06/00–01/05), Audi D2 A8 (ABZ: 06/94–05/99, AKG: 06/97–12/98), Audi C4 S6 Plus (AHK: 06/96–10/97), Audi D2 S8 (AHC: 09/96–12/98, AKH: 08/97–12/98) "ID and data from ETKA".
reference
"Der Motor (The Engine)". AudiV8.com (in German). 1 November 2008.

=== 4.2 V8 40v 220–265 kW ===
identification
parts code prefix: 077
engine displacement & engine configuration
4,172 cc (254.6 cu in) 90° V8; bore × stroke: 84.5 mm × 93.0 mm (3.33 in × 3.66 in), stroke ratio: 0.91:1 – under-square/long-stroke, 521.5 cc per cylinder; compression ratio: 11.0:1
cylinder block & crankcase
cast aluminium alloy; five main bearings, die-forged steel crankshaft
cylinder heads & valvetrain
cast aluminium alloy; five valves per cylinder, 40 valves total, timing belt and simplex chain-driven (hybrid system) double overhead camshafts
fuel system, ignition system, engine management
two linked common fuel distribution rails, multi-point electronic sequential indirect fuel injection with eight intake manifold-sited fuel injectors; Bosch Motronic electronic engine control unit (ECU); 98 RON/ROZ(93 AKI) EuroSuperPlus (premium) unleaded recommended for maximum performance and fuel economy
DIN-rated motive power & torque outputs, ID codes
220 kW (299 PS; 295 bhp) at 6,200 rpm; 400 N⋅m (295 lbf⋅ft) at 3,000 rpm — ARS, ASG
228 kW (310 PS; 306 bhp) at 6,200 rpm; 410 N⋅m (302 lbf⋅ft) at 3,000 rpm — AUX, AWN
250 kW (340 PS; 335 bhp) at 7,000 rpm; 420 N⋅m (310 lbf⋅ft) at 3,400 rpm — AQJ, ANK
265 kW (360 PS; 355 bhp) at 7,000 rpm; 430 N⋅m (317 lbf⋅ft) at 3,400 rpm — AQH, AVP, AYS, BCS
applications
Audi C5 A6 (ARS: 99–00, ASG: 00–04), Audi D2 A8 (AUX: 99–01, AWN: 01–02), Audi C5 S6 (AQJ: 99–01, ANK: 01–04), Audi D2 S8 (AQH: 05/99–02/01, AVP: 09/00–09/02, {Japan only – BCS: 09/00–02/01, AYS: 02/01–09/02}) "ID and data from ETKA".

=== 4.2 V8 40v T 331–353 kW (C5 RS6) ===
Based on the existing 4.2 V8 from the Audi C5 S6, this engine was tuned with the assistance of VW Group subsidiary Cosworth Technology (now MAHLE Powertrain), and featured two parallel turbochargers, known as biturbo, with two side-mounted intercoolers (SMICs). Enlarged and modified intake and exhaust ports on the new five valve cylinder heads, together with new induction and dual branch exhaust systems, a re-calibrated Motronic engine management system, revised cooling system, and decorative carbon fibre engine covers complete the upgrade.

The initial 331 kW (450 PS; 444 bhp) variant of this engine generates a specific power output of 79.3 kW (107.8 PS; 106.3 bhp) per litre displacement, and the RS6 Plus 353 kW (480 PS; 473 bhp) variant gives 84.6 kW (115.0 PS; 113.5 bhp) per litre.

identification
parts code prefix: 077.A
engine displacement & engine configuration
4,172 cc (254.6 cu in) 90° V8; bore × stroke: 84.5 mm × 93.0 mm (3.33 in × 3.66 in), stroke ratio: 0.91:1 – under-square/long-stroke, 521.5 cc per cylinder; compression ratio: 9.8:1, two oil coolers – oil:water and oil:air, two or three (dependent on target market) coolant radiators
cylinder block & crankcase
cast aluminium alloy; five main bearings, die-forged steel crossplane crankshaft with shared crankpins, two-part oil sump – upper: baffled cast alloy, lower: pressed steel, simplex roller-chain–driven oil pump
cylinder heads & valvetrain
cast aluminium alloy; five valves per cylinder (three inlet, and two sodium-cooled exhaust valves), 40 valves total, low-friction roller-bearing finger cam followers with automatic hydraulic valve clearance compensation, timing belt and simplex roller chain-driven (hybrid system) hollow-tube double overhead camshafts (the crankshaft-driven timing belt operates both exhaust camshafts, which in turn individually chain-drive the inlet camshafts), variable inlet camshaft timing
aspiration
two carbon fibre-cased siamesed air filters, two hot-film air mass meters, cast alloy intake manifold with Bosch E-Gas drive by wire electronic throttle control valve, biturbo – two fast-acting turbochargers (one per cylinder bank) with vacuum-actuated excess pressure control, two all-alloy side-mounted intercoolers (SMICs) optimised to prevent pressure loss
fuel system, ignition system, engine management
fuel tank sited electric low pressure fuel lift pump, underfloor electric high pressure relay fuel pump, common-rail multi-point electronic sequential indirect fuel injection with eight intake manifold-sited fuel injectors; eight individual single-spark ignition coils, NGK longlife spark plugs; Bosch Motronic ME 7.1.1 electronic engine control unit (ECU); 98 RON/ROZ(93 AKI) EuroSuperPlus (premium) unleaded recommended for maximum performance and fuel economy
exhaust system
dual-branch exhaust pipes with metallic-element catalytic converters and secondary air injection, four lambda sensors, European EU3 emissions standard
DIN-rated motive power & torque outputs, ID codes & applications
331 kW (450 PS; 444 bhp) at 5,700–6,400 rpm; 560 N⋅m (413 lbf⋅ft) at 1,950–5,600 rpm — BCY: Audi C5 RS6 (07/02–09/04)
353 kW (480 PS; 473 bhp) at 6,000–6,400 rpm; 560 N⋅m (413 lbf⋅ft) at 1,950–6,000 rpm — BRV: Audi C5 RS6 Plus (04/04–09/04)
references
"ID and data from ETKA".
"Audi RS6 in depth". WorldCarFans.com. AUDI AG. 30 May 2002.
"KS Aluminium-Technologie: engine blocks for the new Audi A6". Rheinmetall.de. Rheinmetall AG. August 2004. Archived from the original on 5 October 2012.

=== 4.2 V8 FSI 32v ===
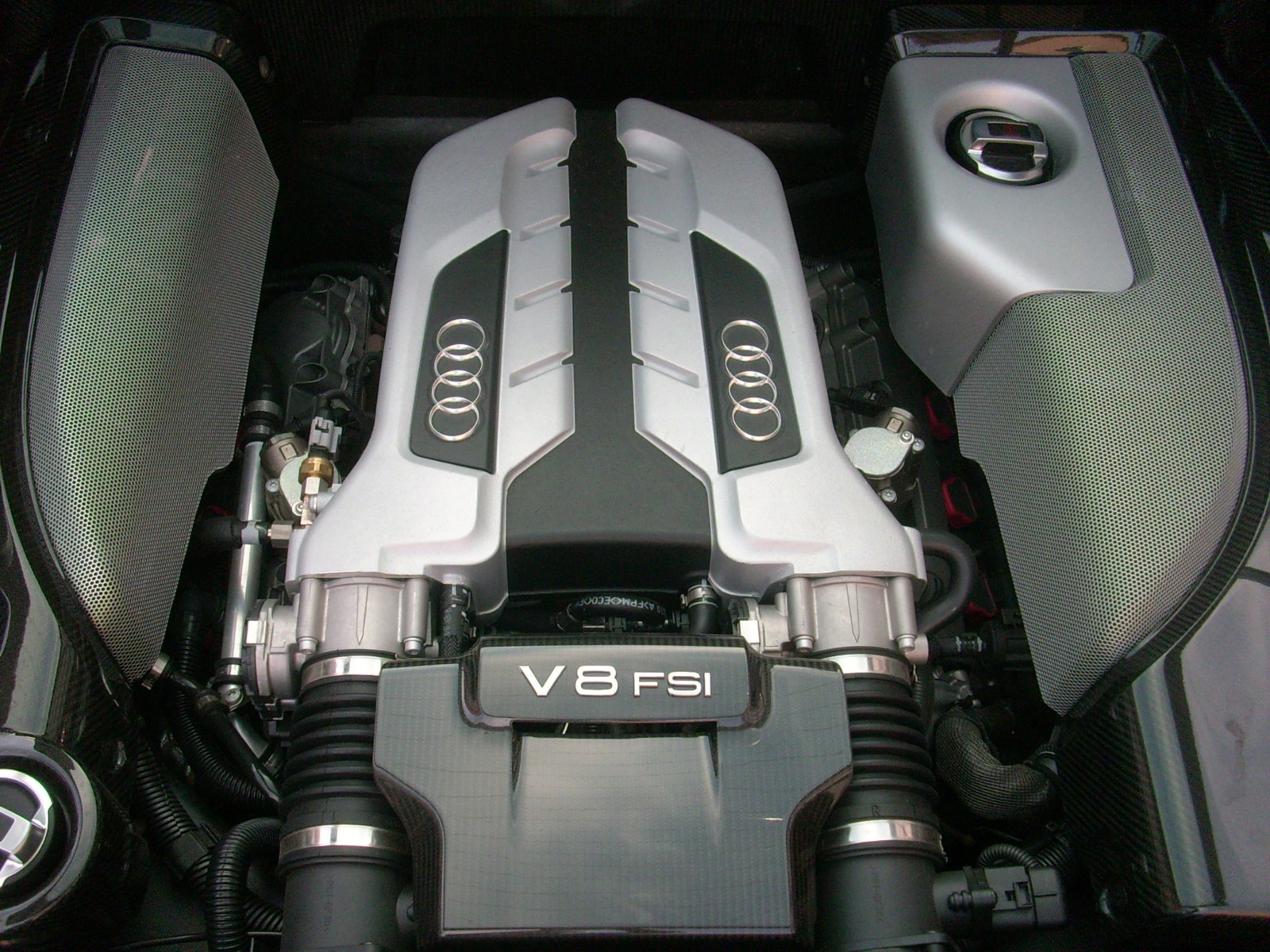
The 4.2 FSI V8 as installed in the Audi R8

Based on the existing Audi 40 valve V8, this new engine is heavily revised over its predecessor, with all-new components including: crankshaft, connecting rods and pistons, cylinder heads and valvetrain, oil and cooling system, intake and exhaust system, and engine management system. It is available in two versions; a basic or comfort version, first used in the Audi Q7; and a sports-focussed high-revving version, with features borrowed from motorsport, for the B7 RS 4 quattro and the R8. This is the first eight-cylinder road car engine to use Fuel Stratified Injection (FSI), which was successfully developed by Audi in their Le Mans winning R8 racing car. The 5.2 V10 FSI was developed directly from this V8 engine.

identification
parts code prefix/variant: 079.D
displacement & configuration
4,163 cc (254.0 cu in) 90° V8 engine; 18.5 mm (0.73 in) cylinder bank offset; 90 mm (3.54 in) cylinder spacing; bore and stroke: 84.5 mm × 92.8 mm (3.33 in × 3.65 in), stroke ratio: 0.91:1 – under-square/long-stroke, 520.4 cc per cylinder, compression ratio: 12.5:1, firing order: 1–5–4–8–6–3–7–2; water:oil lubricant cooler (RS 4/R8 utilises an additional thermostatically controlled air:oil cooler); Q7 and RS 4 utilise a wet sump system (RS 4 with additional longitudinal axis flapped baffles controlled by lateral g-force), R8 uses dry sump
cylinder block & crankcase
homogeneous monoblock low-pressure chill gravity die casting hypereutectic Alusil aluminium-silicon alloy (AlSi17Cu4Mg) with a closed-deck design, mechanically stripped hard silicon crystal integral liners, honed under simulated mechanical stress; reinforced by a cast lower crankcase alloy bedplate (AlSi17Cu4Mg) mimicking a ladder-frame design, and including five GGG50 nodular cast iron press-fit main bearing caps each attached by four bolts; 464 mm (18.3 in) overall length, 228 mm (9.0 in) cylinder block height; two-stage 3/8" simplex roller-chain- and gear-driven accessory drive which includes the oil pump, water pump, power steering pump, and air conditioning compressor; baffle-plate sump
crankshaft, connecting rods and pistons
die-forged and tempered high alloy steel (42CrMoS4) 90° crankshaft with 65 mm (2.6 in) diameter and 18.5 mm (0.73 in) width main bearing journals and 54 mm (2.1 in) diameter and 15.25 mm (0.60 in) width big end bearing journals; 154 mm (6.1 in) long high strength forged cracked trapezoidal connecting rods (36MnVS4 in basic engine, ultra high strength 34CrNiMo8 in RS 4/R8 with more restrictive geometry tolerances); forged 290 g (10.2 oz) aluminium pistons with shaped piston crowns designed to impart charged volume tumbling effect for fully homogeneous air/fuel charge
cylinder heads & valvetrain
cast aluminium alloy, partition-plate horizontally divided intake ports producing a tumble effect (larger cross-section on RS 4/R8); four valves per cylinder: chrome-plated solid-stem (hollow-stem on RS 4/R8) intake valves, and chrome-plated sodium-filled hollow-stem exhaust valves, both with 11 mm (0.43 in) valve lift (longer valve lift on RS 4/R8), 32 valves total; lightweight low-friction roller finger cam followers (uprated with peened rollers on RS 4/R8) with automatic hydraulic valve clearance compensation, double overhead camshafts (each a hollow tube composite) on each cylinder bank, driven from the flywheel side via a two-stage chain drive using three 3/8" simplex roller chains (sleeve-type on RS 4/R8), valve opening (in crank angle degrees) 200 intake (230 for RS 4/R8) and 210 e exhaust (230 for RS 4/R8); valve overlap facilitates integral exhaust gas recirculation; continuous hydraulic vane-adjustable variable valve timing for intake and exhaust camshafts with up to 42 degrees adjustment, each controlled via information from Hall sensors, Audi "RS" red plastic cam covers on RS 4, 'anthracite' plastic on R8
aspiration
two single-entry air filters each with hot-film air mass flow meters (Q7), or triple-entry single air filter with single hot-film air mass meter (RS 4), or double-entry dual-element single air filter with two hot-film air mass flow meters (R8); single (Q7 & RS 4) or twin (R8) cast alloy throttle body electronically controlled Bosch E-Gas throttle valves (Bosch 82 mm (3.2 in) diameter on Q7, Pierburg 90 mm (3.5 in) diameter on RS4), two-stage four-piece gravity die-cast (Q7) (sand-cast on RS 4/R8) magnesium-aluminium alloy variable length intake manifold with electronically map-controlled silicon tipped tract-length flaps along with tumble flaps inducing a swirling movement in the drawn air (RS 4 & R8 do not use a variable tract-length intake manifold)
fuel system
fully demand-controlled, (Q7 returnless, RS 4 return to tank); fuel tank–mounted low-pressure fuel pump; Fuel Stratified Injection (FSI): two inlet double-cam–driven single-piston high-pressure injection pumps maintaining a pressure between 30 and 100 bar (435 and 1,450 psi) in the two stainless steel common fuel distribution rails, eight combustion chamber sited direct injection solenoid-controlled 65 volt single-hole sequential fuel injectors with integrated swirl plates; 98 RON/ROZ (93 AKI) EuroSuperPlus (premium) unleaded recommended for maximum performance and fuel economy (95 RON (91 AKI) may be used, but will reduce performance and worsen fuel economy)
ignition system & engine management
mapped direct ignition with centrally mounted longlife spark plugs and eight individual direct-acting single spark coils; Bosch Motronic MED 9.1.1 electronic engine control unit (ECU) (two MED 9.1 ECUs in the RS 4 and R8, working on the master and slave concept due to the high revving nature of the engine), four knock sensors, EU4 emissions standard, map-controlled coolant thermostat (Q7 only), additional electric after-run coolant pump with two additional side-mounted radiators (RS 4/R8), water-cooled alternator, two map-controlled radiator fans
exhaust system
vacuum-controlled secondary air injection to assist cold start operation; air-gap insulated exhaust manifold per cylinder bank (Q7), or 4-into-2-into-1 fan-branch exhaust manifold per cylinder bank to minimise reverse pulsation of expelled exhaust gases (RS 4), or fan branch manifold with integrated catalytic converter per cylinder bank; two close-coupled and two main underfloor catalytic converters – ceramic on Q7, high-flow metallic on RS 4, or main catalytic converter integrated into transverse main rear silencer with quad outlets; four heated oxygen (lambda) sensors (broadband upstream, nonlinear downstream) monitoring pre- and post-catalyst exhaust gases; siamesed absorption-type middle silencer (Q7 with crossover) and siamesed rear silencer, separate rear silencers on RS 4 with vacuum-operated flap valves
dimensions
Q7 (for auto transmission with plate-type flywheel): approx. 198 kg (437 lb), RS4 (for 6-speed manual with dual-mass flywheel): approx. 212 kg (467 lb)
DIN-rated power & torque outputs, ID codes, applications
257 kW (349 PS; 345 bhp) at 6,800 rpm; 440 N⋅m (325 lbf⋅ft) at 3,500 rpm, 85% available from 2,000 rpm — BAR: Audi Q7 (03/06–05/10), Volkswagen Touareg (06/06–05/10); BVJ: Audi C6 A6 (05/06–08/11), Audi D3 A8 (06/06–07/10)
260 kW (354 PS; 349 bhp) at 7,000 rpm — CAU: Audi S5 (06/07–03/12)
309 kW (420 PS; 414 bhp) at 7,800 rpm; 430 N⋅m (317 lbf⋅ft) at 5,500 rpm, 90% available between 2,250 and 7,600 rpm, 8,250 rpm rev limiter — BNS: Audi RS 4 (B7) (09/05–06/08); BYH: Audi R8 (04/07–09/10; –02/15 for facelift model with 430-hp engine)
331 kW (450 PS; 444 bhp) at 8,250 rpm; 430 N⋅m (317 lbf⋅ft) at 4000–6000 rpm, 90% available between 2,250 and 7600 rpm, 8,500 rpm rev limiter — CFSA: Audi RS 4 (B8) (06/12–09/15); Audi RS 5 (06/2010–09/17)
references
"KS Aluminium-Technologie: engine blocks for the new Audi A6". Rheinmetall.de. Rheinmetall AG. August 2004. Archived from the original on 5 October 2012.
"ALUSIL – Cylinder Blocks for the new Audi V6 and V8 SI engines" (PDF). KSPG-AG.com. KS Aluminium-Technologie AG.
Audi 4.2-liter V8 FSI Engine – Self-Study Programme 921603. Auburn Hills, Michigan: Audi of America, Inc., Service Training. July 2006.
"Audi RS4 Saloon – Technical Data". AUDI AG. February 2005. Archived from the original (MS Word document) on 27 July 2011.
"Geneva Motor Show: Audi RS4 – The Sports Car for 365 Days a Year". VWvortex.com – Audi News. AUDI AG. 1 March 2005. Archived from the original on 16 July 2011.
"New Audi RS4". WorldCarFans.com. AUDI AG – press release. 5 September 2005. Archived from the original on 29 February 2012.
"Audi Q7 in depth". WorldCarFans.com. AUDI AG – press release. 31 January 2006. Archived from the original on 3 October 2009. "2011 Audi R8 V8 Review – TractionLife" tractionlife.com. AUDI AG. 29 January 2022.: "2015 Audi R8 Prices, Reviews, and Photos – MotorTrend" motortrend.com. AUDI AG.: "Audi RS4 Avant (2012–2017) review" autoexpress.co.uk. AUDI AG. 15 July 2015.: "2013 Audi RS5 First Drive – Car and Driver" caranddriver.com. AUDI AG. 12 August 2012.

==== Awards ====
was placed in the 2005 and 2006 annual list of Ward's 10 Best Engines

=== 4.2 V8 40v ===
identification
parts code prefix: 079
engine displacement & engine configuration
4,172 cc (254.6 cu in) 90° V8 engine; 90 mm (3.54 in) cylinder spacing; bore × stroke: 84.5 mm × 93 mm (3.33 in × 3.66 in), stroke ratio: 1.1:1 – under-square/long-stroke, 521.5 cc per cylinder
cylinder block & crankcase
homogeneous monobloc low-pressure gravity die cast hypereutectic Alusil aluminium-silicon alloy (AlSi17Cu4Mg) with a closed-deck design, mechanically stripped hard silicon crystal integral liners, honed under simulated mechanical stress; five main bearings; die-forged steel crankshaft
cylinder heads & valvetrain
cast aluminium alloy, five valves per cylinder, 40 valves total; lightweight low-friction roller cam followers with automatic hydraulic valve clearance compensation, roller chain-driven double overhead camshafts
aspiration
synthetic material two-stage variable intake manifold
fuel system & engine management
two linked common fuel distribution rails, multi-point electronic sequential indirect fuel injection with eight intake manifold-sited fuel injectors; Bosch Motronic ME 7.1.1. electronic engine control unit (ECU); 98 RON/ROZ (93 AKI) EuroSuperPlus (premium) unleaded recommended for maximum performance and fuel economy
exhaust system
two multi-stage catalytic converters
dimensions
length: 464 mm (18.27 in), mass: 195 kg (430 lb)
DIN-rated motive power & torque outputs, ID codes
246 kW (334 PS; 330 bhp) at 6,600 rpm; 420 N⋅m (310 lbf⋅ft) at 3,500 rpm, 6,800 rpm max — Audi A6, BAT, A8: BFM (BFM engine is belt-driven)
221 kW (300 PS; 296 bhp) at 6,200 rpm; 380 N⋅m (280 lbf⋅ft) at 2,700–4,600 rpm, 6,500 rpm max — Audi A6 allroad: BAS
253 kW (344 PS; 339 bhp) at 7,000 rpm; 410 N⋅m (302 lbf⋅ft) at 3,500 rpm — Audi S4: BBK (03/03–03/09)
253 kW (344 PS; 339 bhp) at 7,200 rpm; 420 N⋅m (310 lbf⋅ft) at 3,000 rpm — Audi S4: BHF (03/03–03/09 – US/Korea only)
246 kW (334 PS; 330 bhp) at 6,500 rpm; 435 N⋅m (321 lbf⋅ft) at 2,800–3,700 rpm — Volkswagen Phaeton: BGH, BGJ (belt-driven)
applications
Audi B6 S4, Audi B7 S4, Audi C5 A6 allroad (BAS: 07/02–08/05), Audi C6 A6 (BAT: 05/04–05/06), Audi A8 (BFM: 10/02–07/10), Volkswagen Phaeton (BGJ: 05/03–07/03, BGH: 08/03–05/10)
reference
"KS Aluminium-Technologie: engine blocks for the new Audi A6". Rheinmetall.de. Rheinmetall AG. August 2004. Archived from the original on 5 October 2012.
"ALUSIL – Cylinder Blocks for the new Audi V6 and V8 SI engines" (PDF). KSPG-AG.com. KS Aluminium-Technologie AG.
"New Audi A6 in depth". WorldCarFans.com. Audi AG. 8 April 2004. Archived from the original on 22 April 2012.

==== Awards ====
was placed in the 2004 annual list of Ward's 10 Best Engines

=== 6.75 V8 biturbo (Bentley) ===
This 6.75 litre V8 is a legacy engine, developed by Rolls-Royce Limited before the takeover of Bentley Motors Limited by the German Volkswagen Group but still used during their ownership.

engine displacement & engine configuration
6,748 cc (411.8 cu in) 90° V8 engine; bore × stroke: 104.1 mm × 99.1 mm (4.10 in × 3.90 in), stroke ratio: 1.05:1 – over-square/short-stroke, 843.5 cc per cylinder
cylinder block & crankcase
cast aluminium alloy, single central camshaft
cylinder heads & valvetrain
cast aluminium alloy, two valves per cylinder, 16 valves total, overhead valve (OHV) with pushrods
aspiration
biturbo – one turbocharger per cylinder bank
DIN-rated motive power & torque outputs
335 kW (455 PS; 449 bhp) at 4,100 rpm; 875 N⋅m (645 lbf⋅ft) at 3,250 rpm
375 kW (510 PS; 503 bhp) at 4,200 rpm; 1,050 N⋅m (774 lbf⋅ft) at 3,300 rpm — R
395 kW (537 PS; 530 bhp) at ?,??? rpm; 1,050 N⋅m (774 lbf⋅ft) — Bentley Brooklands, Bentley Mulsanne Speed
applications
2005 Bentley Arnage, 2006 Bentley Azure, 2008 Bentley Brooklands, 2010 Bentley Mulsanne
references
German press release: auto katalog 2006; auto, motor und sport
"2008 Bentley Brooklands Coupe". LeftLaneNews.com. LeftLane. Archived from the original on 26 September 2010.

== Ten-cylinder ==
=== 5.0 V10 40v (Lamborghini) ===
Only the third engine developed by Automobili Lamborghini S.p.A., and the first since Lamborghini was acquired by AUDI AG, this engine shares many technologies with other Audi-developed engines, although it is not directly based on any existing designs. It is constructed in two distinct stages: all components within the cylinder block and crankcase are built up at the Audi Hungaria Motor Kft. factory in Győr, with final assembly being completed at Sant'Agata Bolognese.

engine displacement & engine configuration
4,961 cc (302.7 cu in) 90° V10 engine; bore × stroke: 82.5 mm × 92.8 mm (3.25 in × 3.65 in), stroke ratio: 0.89:1 – under-square/long-stroke, 496.1 cc per cylinder; compression ratio: 11.5:1; dry sump lubrication system
cylinder block & crankcase
cast aluminium alloy with integrated liners with eutectic alloy; 88 mm (3.46 in) cylinder bore spacing; die-forged steel crankshaft with split crankpins (to create even 72 deg firing interval with the 90 deg vee-angle)
cylinder heads & valvetrain
cast aluminium alloy; four valves per cylinder, 40 valves total, low-friction roller finger cam followers with automatic hydraulic valve clearance compensation, chain-driven double overhead camshafts, continuously variable valve timing system both for intake and exhaust
aspiration
two air filters, two hot-film air mass meters, two cast alloy throttle bodies each with electronically controlled drive by wire throttle butterfly valves, cast magnesium alloy variable geometry and resonance intake manifold
fuel system
two linked common fuel distribution rails, multi-point electronic sequential indirect fuel injection with ten intake manifold-sited fuel injectors
ignition system & engine management
mapped direct ignition with centrally mounted spark plugs and ten individual direct-acting single spark coils; two Lamborghini LIE electronic engine control units (ECUs) working on the master and slave concept due to the high revving nature of the engine
exhaust system
five-into-one exhaust manifolds for each cylinder bank
DIN-rated motive power & torque outputs
368 kW (500 PS; 493 bhp) at 7,800 rpm; 510 N⋅m (376 lbf⋅ft) at 4,500 rpm (80% available from 1,500 rpm) — 2003–2005
382 kW (519 PS; 512 bhp) at 8,000 rpm; 510 N⋅m (376 lbf⋅ft) at 4,250 rpm — SE, Spyder, and 2006-on
390 kW (530 PS; 523 bhp) at 8,000 rpm; 510 N⋅m (376 lbf⋅ft) at 4,250 rpm — Superleggera
application
Lamborghini Gallardo
references
Audi 5.2 litre V10 FSI engine. Service Training – Self-Study Programme (SSP 376 ed.). Neckarsulm, Germany: AUDI AG. June 2006. "The (Audi) V10 belongs to the next generation of Audi V-engines, all of which have a 90-degree included angle and a spacing of 90 millimetres between cylinder centres. Compared to the engine in the Lamborghini Gallardo, which has a spacing of 88 millimetres between cylinder centres, the Audi engine has several new features in key areas."
"Lamborghini Cars full specifications – First spyshots of the Lamborghini L140 model". LamboCars.com.
"Conversation: Lamborghini CEO Stephan Winkelmann – Italian style, German quality". Edmunds.com. Edmunds Inc. 27 February 2007.
"Lamborghini Gallardo LP560-4 – New Gallardo V10 bends design rules – Secrets behind Lamborghini's latest projectile, the LP560-4". evo.co.uk. Dennis Publishing. 7 March 2008.
"Lamborghini gives Gallardo bigger engine, new name". AutoWeek.com. Crain Communications. 26 February 2008. Archived from the original on 28 June 2011.

=== 5.0 V10 40v TFSI (Audi C6 RS6) ===
This Audi V10 TFSI – a 5.0 litre V10 biturbo petrol engine is one of the most powerful engines fitted into any Volkswagen Group automobile. From its DIN-rated maximum power output of 426 kW (579 PS; 571 bhp), this engine generates a specific power output of 85.4 kW (116.1 PS; 114.5 bhp) per litre displacement.

identification
parts code prefix/variant: 07L.B, ID code: BUH
engine displacement & engine configuration
4,991 cc (304.6 cu in) 90° V10 engine; bore × stroke: 84.5 mm × 89.0 mm (3.33 in × 3.50 in), stroke ratio: 0.95:1 – under-square/long-stroke, 499.1 cc per cylinder, compression ratio: 10.5:1; dry sump lubrication system, simplex roller chain and gear-driven external ancillaries including combined oil pump and centrifugal coolant pump, two oil coolers – oil:water and thermostatically controlled oil:air, water-cooled alternator
cylinder block & crankcase
homogeneous monoblock low-pressure chill die cast hypereutectic Alusil aluminium-silicon alloy (AlSi17Cu4Mg); reinforced by a cast alloy bedplate with six integral GGG50 grey cast iron main bearing caps each affixed by four bolts, web-reinforced inner vee; inner-vee balance shaft eliminating first degree inertial forces, 90 mm (3.54 in) cylinder bore spacing, 18.5 mm (0.73 in) cylinder bank offset; die-forged steel crossplane crankshaft with pins shared by opposing pistons (contrary to the 5.2 V10 from the S6), cast aluminium alloy oil sump
cylinder heads & valvetrain
cast aluminium alloy; partition-plate horizontally divided intake ports designed to induce swirl-effect during induction stroke, four valves per cylinder, 40 valves total, low-friction roller finger cam followers with automatic hydraulic valve clearance compensation, double overhead camshafts driven from the rear flywheel end in a relay method using four roller chains, continuously adjusting variable valve timing for intake and exhaust camshafts, plastic-composite cam covers
aspiration
two air filters, two hot-film air mass meters, two cast alloy throttle bodies each with electronically controlled Bosch "E-Gas" throttle valves, three-part sand-cast magnesium alloy fixed tract-length intake manifold incorporating electronically controlled vacuum-actuated two-stage tumble flaps inducing a swirling movement in the drawn air, biturbo: two parallel water-cooled (with reverse flow electric after-run pump) turbochargers integrated into exhaust manifold with electronically controlled vacuum-actuated excess pressure regulation giving a maximum boost of 1.6 bar (23.2 psi), two side-mounted intercoolers (SMICs)
fuel system
fully demand-controlled; two fuel tank–mounted low-pressure fuel lift pumps, Fuel Stratified Injection (FSI): two returnless single-piston high-pressure FSI injection pumps driven via roller tappet from a double cam lobe on the inlet camshaft – maintaining a maximum pressure of 120 bar (1,740 psi) in the two separate stainless steel common fuel distribution rails (one rail per cylinder bank), ten combustion chamber sited direct injection solenoid-controlled sequential fuel injectors
ignition system & engine management
mapped direct ignition with centrally mounted spark plugs and ten individual direct-acting single spark coils; two Bosch Motronic ME 9.1.2 electronic engine control units (ECUs) working on the master/slave concept due to the high rev limit
exhaust system
two close-coupled and two main underfloor catalytic converters, eight lambda sensors
DIN-rated motive power & torque output
BUH: 426 kW (579 PS; 571 bhp) at 6,250–6,700 rpm; 650 N⋅m (480 lbf⋅ft) at 1,500–6,250 rpm
application
Audi C6 RS6 5.0 TFSI quattro (04/08–08/10)
reference
"Audi RS6 Sedan unleashed ahead of Paris debut". WorldCarFans.com. AUDI AG. 12 August 2008., "Self-Study Programme (SSP 431)" (PDF). AUDI AG.

=== 5.2 V10 40v FSI (C6 S6/D3 S8) ===
A first in Audi's history, this new generation high-performance V10 engine is based on Audi's V8 FSI engines, and retains the same fundamental design principals of the V8 FSI, including the crankcase, cylinder heads, valvetrain, fuel system and intake manifold. However, an all new crankshaft, balance shaft, double-chambered intake manifold with dual throttle valves, exhaust manifold, and ECU — are all unique to the V10. As part of the new V10 engine development, specific emphasis was placed on 'refinement', 'comfort' and 'sportiness' – as required for installation in Audi high-performance luxury cars. As well as gaining two additional cylinders compared to the V8, it has been bored by an extra two millimetres, and also shares the 90 degree (°) cylinder bank angle of the recent Audi V engines. Audi continue to use the Fuel Stratified Injection (FSI) technology, originally developed in the Audi R8 LMP endurance race cars.

This engine is often, but incorrectly, referred to as a derivative of the Gallardo's original 5.0-litre Lamborghini V10, which was also developed under the Volkswagen Group ownership. However, the subsequent 5.2 V10 FSI installed in the Gallardo LP560 and Audi R8 V10 is fundamentally identical to this Audi unit, save for a stronger crankshaft with solid main pin design, forged pistons, dry sump oiling system, different intake and exhaust valves, and engine management systems.

identification
parts code prefix: 07L
engine displacement & engine configuration
5,204 cc (317.6 cu in) 90° V10 engine; bore × stroke: 84.5 mm × 92.8 mm (3.33 in × 3.65 in), stroke ratio: 0.91:1 – under-square/long-stroke, 520.4 cc per cylinder, compression ratio: 12.5:1
cylinder block & crankcase
homogeneous monoblock low-pressure chill die cast hypereutectic Alusil aluminium-silicon alloy (AlSi17Cu4Mg); reinforced by a cast alloy bedplate (AlSi12Cu1) with six integral GGG50 grey cast iron main bearing caps each affixed by four bolts, 685 mm (27.0 in) long, 80 mm (3.1 in) wide, approx. 47 kg (104 lb) in weight, inner-vee sited chain-driven contra-rotating spheroidal cast iron balance shaft eliminating first degree inertial forces, 90 mm (3.54 in) cylinder bore spacing, 18.5 mm (0.73 in) cylinder bank offset
crankshaft, connecting rods and pistons
die-forged steel crankshaft, with 18 degree crankpin offset to achieve a 72° crank angle even firing interval; high strength cracked trapezoidal connecting rods (36MnVS4); Kolbenschmidt cast aluminium pistons with shaped piston crowns designed to impart charged volume tumbling effect for fully homogenous air/fuel charge, skirt with iron liner
cylinder heads & valvetrain
cast aluminium alloy; partition-plate horizontally divided intake ports, four valves per cylinder, 32.5 mm (1.28 in) intake valves and 28.0 mm (1.10 in) sodium-filled exhaust valves, 40 valves total, low-friction roller finger cam followers with automatic hydraulic valve clearance compensation, hollow tube composite double overhead camshafts driven from the flywheel side via a two-stage chain drive utilising three 3/8" simplex roller chains, continuous vane-adjustable variable valve timing for intake and exhaust camshafts with up to 42 degrees adjustment
aspiration
two air filters, two hot-film air mass meters, two cast alloy throttle bodies each with electronically controlled 68 mm (2.68 in) throttle valves, two-stage four-piece die cast magnesium alloy variable tract-length intake manifold utilising electronically map controlled silicon tipped tract length flaps along with tumble flaps inducing a swirling movement in the drawn air
fuel system
fully demand-controlled and returnless; two fuel tank–mounted low-pressure fuel pumps, Fuel Stratified Injection (FSI): two inlet double-cam–driven single-piston high-pressure injection pumps maintaining a pressure between 30 and 100 bar (435 and 1,450 psi) in the two stainless steel common fuel distribution rails with an over-pressure release valve set to 136 bar (1,973 psi), ten combustion chamber sited direct injection solenoid-controlled 65 volt single-hole sequential fuel injectors with integrated swirl plates
ignition system & engine management
mapped direct ignition with centrally mounted spark plugs and ten individual direct-acting single spark coils; two Bosch Motronic MED 9.1 electronic engine control units (ECUs) working on the master and slave concept due to the high revving nature of the engine, four knock sensors, EU4 emissions standard
exhaust system
vacuum-controlled secondary air injection into exhaust ports to assist cold start operation, 2–1–2 branch exhaust manifold per cylinder bank (650 mm (25.6 in) nominal length) to minimise reverse pulsation of expelled exhaust gases, four close-coupled 600-cell ceramic catalytic converters, eight heated oxygen (lambda) sensors monitoring pre- and post-catalyst exhaust gases
dimensions
approx. 220 kg (485 lb) (20 kg (44 lb) less than the BMW S85 with its 98 mm (3.9 in) bore spacing); length: 685 mm (27.0 in), width: 801 mm (31.5 in), height: 713 mm (28.1 in) with all components
DIN-rated motive power & torque outputs, applications, ID codes
Audi S6 — BXA: 320 kW (435 PS; 429 bhp) at 6,800 rpm; 540 N⋅m (398 lbf⋅ft) at 3,000–4,000 rpm, (over 500 N⋅m (369 lbf⋅ft) between 2,500 and 5,500 rpm)
Audi S8 — BSM: 331 kW (450 PS; 444 bhp) at 7,000 rpm; 540 N⋅m (398 lbf⋅ft) at 3,500 rpm (90% available from 2,300 rpm), 21.7 m/s maximum piston speed, 13.04 bar (189.13 psi) maximum MEP
applications
Audi C6 S6 (03/06–08/11), Audi D3 S8 (06/06–07/10)
references
"KS Aluminium-Technologie: engine blocks for the new Audi A6". Rheinmetall.de. Rheinmetall AG. August 2004. Archived from the original on 5 October 2012.
Audi 5.2 litre V10 FSI engine. Service Training – Self-Study Programme (SSP 376 ed.). Neckarsulm, Germany: AUDI AG. June 2006. "The (Audi) V10 belongs to the next generation of Audi V-engines, all of which have a 90-degree included angle and a spacing of 90 millimetres between cylinder centres. Compared to the engine in the Lamborghini Gallardo, which has a spacing of 88 millimetres between cylinder centres, the Audi engine has several new features in key areas."
"New Audi S8". WorldCarFans.com. AUDI AG. 19 October 2005. Archived from the original on 29 February 2012.
"New Audi S8 in depth". WorldCarFans.com. AUDI AG. 2 December 2005. Archived from the original on 30 July 2013.
"New Audi S6 in depth". WorldCarFans.com. AUDI AG. 20 March 2006. Archived from the original on 29 February 2012.

== Twelve-cylinder ==
=== 6.2/6.5 V12 48v (Lamborghini) ===
This was a legacy engine, an original 3.5 litre version was developed nearly 50 years before the takeover of Automobili Lamborghini S.p.A. by the German Volkswagen Group subsidiary AUDI AG. The current 6.2 and 6.5 litre versions can trace their lineage to the original. The final model to use this was the Murciélago, which was released during the current VW Group ownership, developed with help from Audi.

engine configuration
60° V12 engine; dry sump lubrication system
engine displacement etc.
6.2: 6,192 cc (377.9 cu in); bore × stroke: 87.0 mm × 86.8 mm (3.43 in × 3.42 in), stroke ratio: 1.00:1 – square engine, 516.0 cc per cylinder; compression ratio: 11.6:1
6.5: 6,496 cc (396.4 cu in); bore × stroke: 88.0 mm × 89.0 mm (3.46 in × 3.50 in) (stroke ratio: 0.99:1 – square engine); 541.3 cc per cylinder; compression ratio: 11.8:1
cylinder block & crankcase
cast aluminium alloy
cylinder heads & valvetrain
cast aluminium alloy; four valves per cylinder, 48 valves total, double overhead camshafts
aspiration
two air filters, four cast alloy throttle bodies each with Magneti Marelli electronically controlled drive by wire throttle butterfly valves, cast magnesium alloy intake manifold
fuel system & ignition system
two linked common fuel distribution rails, multi-point electronic sequential indirect fuel injection with twelve intake manifold-sited fuel injectors; centrally positioned spark plugs, mapped direct ignition with 12 individual direct-acting single spark coils
exhaust system
two 3-branch exhaust manifolds per cylinder bank, connected to dual-inlet catalytic converters, heated oxygen (lambda) sensors monitoring pre- and post-catalyst exhaust gasses
DIN-rated motive power & torque outputs
6.2: 430 kW (585 PS; 577 bhp) at 7500 rpm; and 650 N⋅m (479 lbf⋅ft) at 5500 rpm
6.5: 471 kW (640 PS; 632 bhp) at 7500 rpm; and 660 N⋅m (487 lbf⋅ft) at 5200 rpm
6.5: 478 kW (650 PS; 641 bhp) — Reventón
applications
2004 Lamborghini Murciélago LP640 Coupé and Roadster, Lamborghini Reventón
reference
German press release: auto katalog 2006
"Lighter Murcielago here in 2008". AutoCar.co.uk. Haymarket Media Group. 9 November 2007. Archived from the original on 29 August 2008.

== See also ==
- list of Volkswagen Group petrol engines (current)
- list of Volkswagen Group diesel engines (current)
- list of discontinued Volkswagen Group diesel engines
- list of North American Volkswagen engines
- Volkswagen Wasserboxer engine
- VR6 engine
- G-Lader
- G60 – for detailed development info and progression of forced induction in Volkswagen Group engines
- Turbocharged Direct Injection (TDI)
- Suction Diesel Injection (SDI)
- BlueMotion
- list of Volkswagen Group platforms
- list of Volkswagen Group factories
