= Volkswagen G60 engine =

Supercharged 4-cylinder engine

Volkswagen G60/G40 engine

Overview
- Manufacturer: Volkswagen Group
- Production: G60: August 1988–July 1993; G40: August 1986–July 1994

Layout
- Configuration: Inline-4
- Displacement: G60: 1.8 L (1,781 cc); G40: 1.3 L (1,272 cc)
- Cylinder bore: G60: 81 mm (3.19 in); G40: 75 mm (2.95 in)
- Piston stroke: G60: 86.4 mm (3.40 in); G40: 72 mm (2.83 in)
- Cylinder block material: Gray cast iron
- Cylinder head material: Cast aluminium alloy
- Valvetrain: 2 valves per cylinder, hydraulic valve lifters, belt-driven single overhead camshaft (SOHC)
- Compression ratio: 8.0:1

Combustion
- Supercharger: G-Lader with intercooler
- Fuel system: Common rail electronic Multi-point fuel injection
- Management: Bosch Digifant
- Fuel type: Unleaded Gasoline
- Oil system: Wet sump
- Cooling system: Water-cooled

Output
- Power output: G60: 118 kW (160 PS; 158 bhp); G40: 85 kW (116 PS; 114 bhp)
- Torque output: G60: 225 N⋅m (166 lb⋅ft); G40: 150 N⋅m (111 lb⋅ft)

Chronology
- Successor: 2005 1.4-litre 'Twincharger'

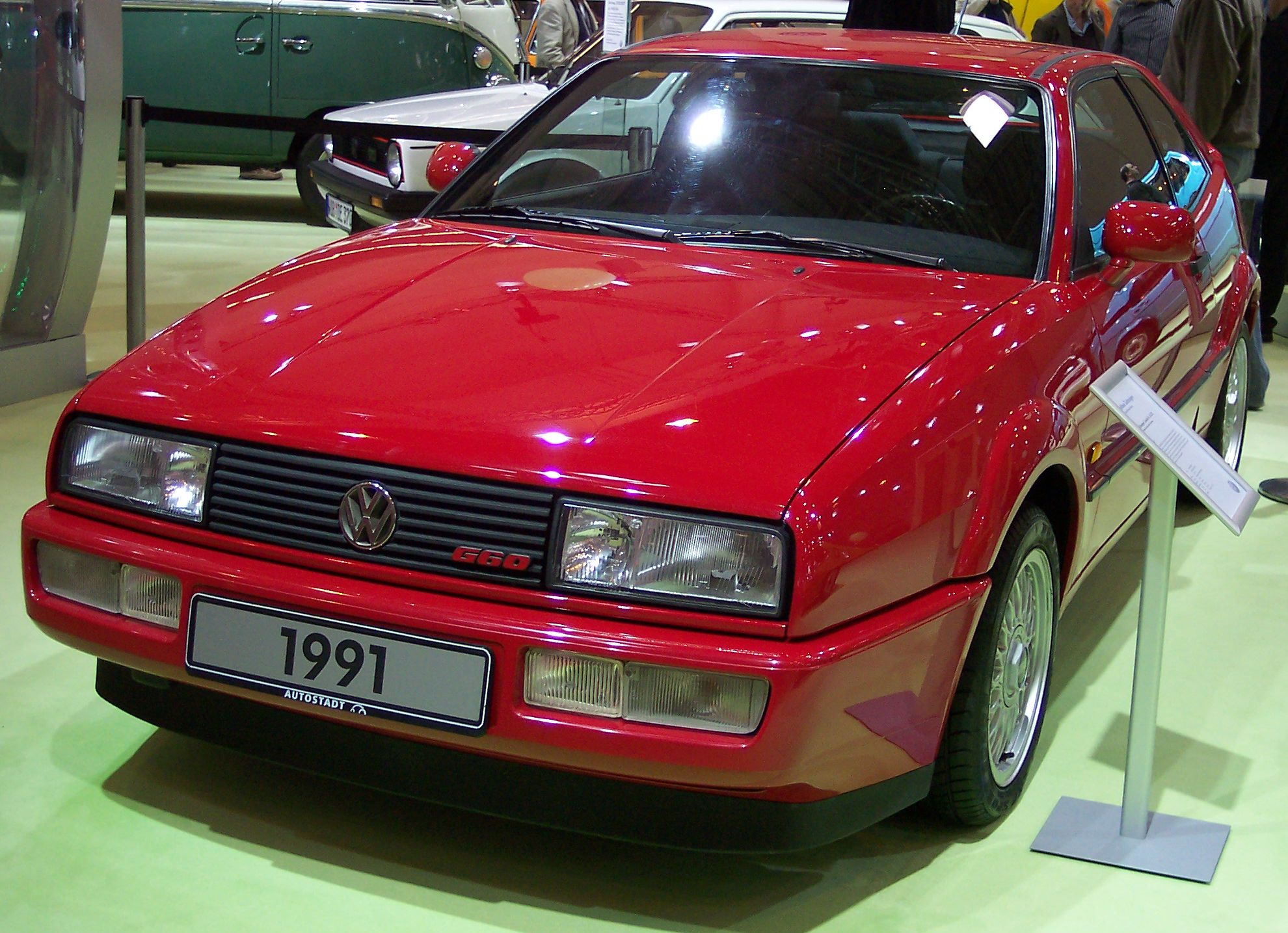
One of the users of the G60 engine, the Volkswagen Corrado 2-door coupé

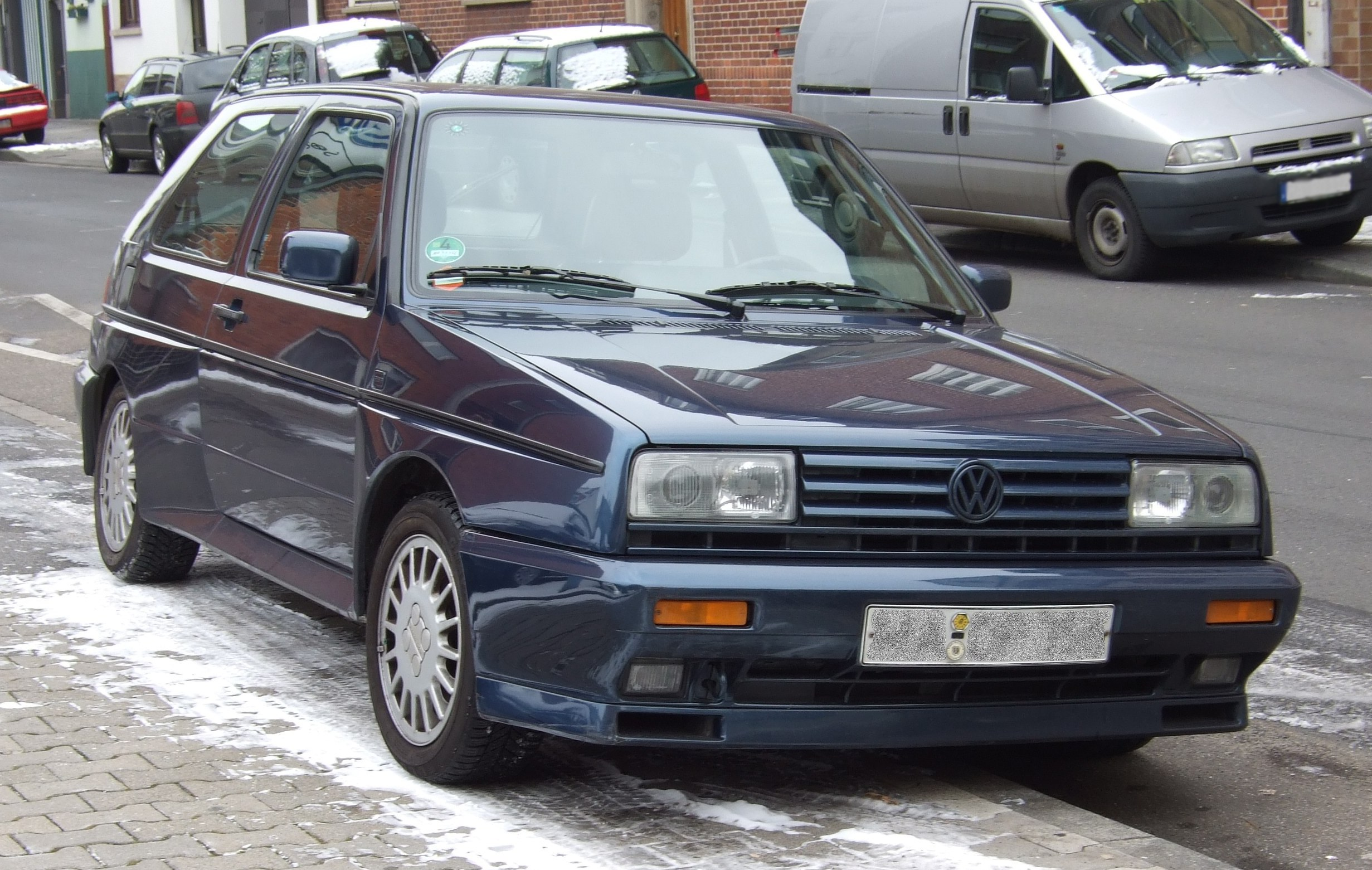
A Volkswagen Golf Mk2 Rallye powered by the G60 engine

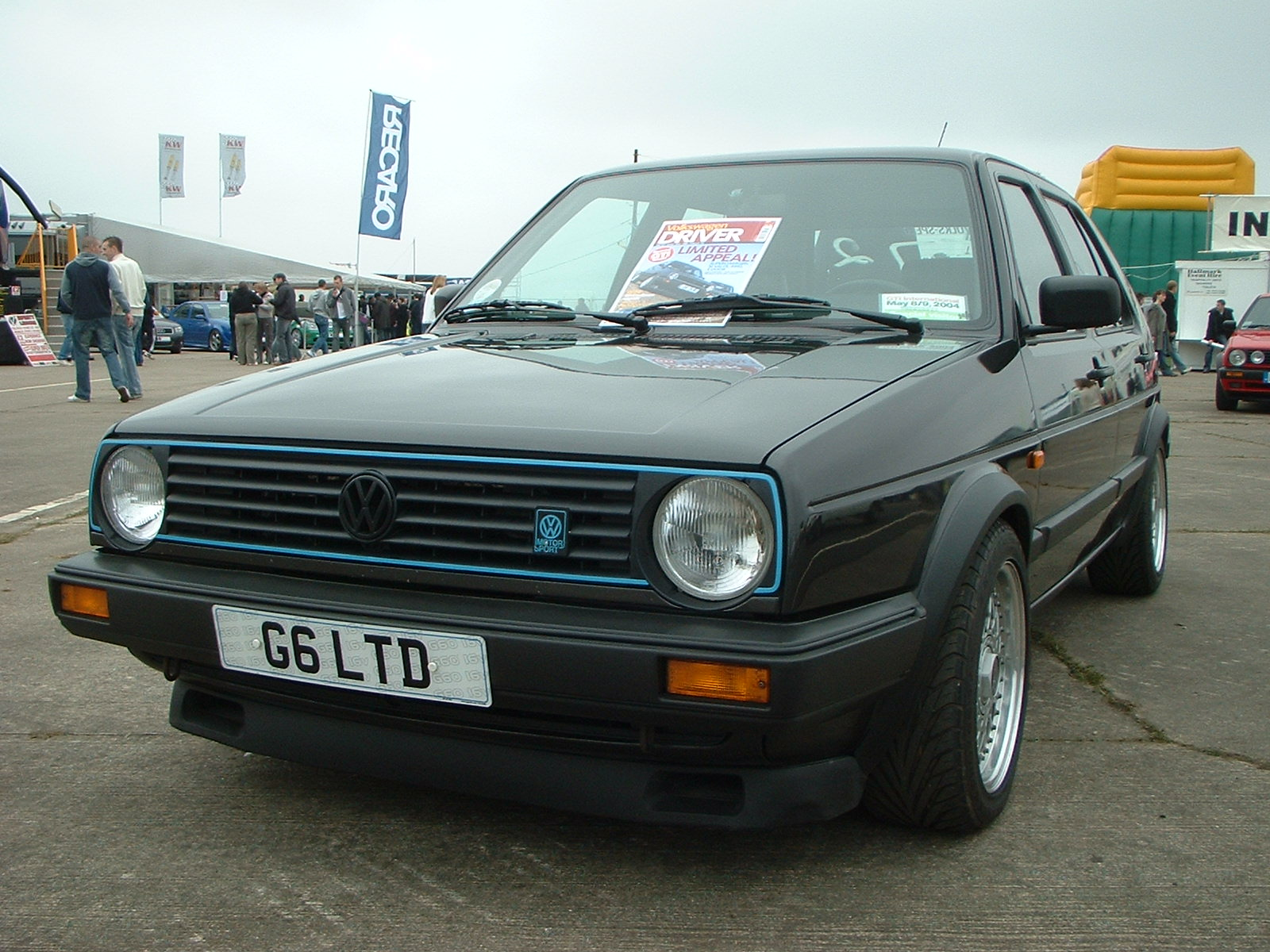
A rare Volkswagen Golf Mk2 G60 Limited hot hatch - one of only 71 produced

The Volkswagen G60 and G40 are inline–four-cylinder car petrol engines, which use forced induction by way of a scroll-type supercharger. The G60 engine was manufactured by the German automaker Volkswagen Group and used in a number of their hot hatch cars from August 1988 to July 1993.

The smaller G40 engine of identical design was previously installed in the Mk2 Volkswagen Polo GT G40 from August 1986 to July 1994.

== Design and specifications ==
The G60 is a 1.8-litre (1,781 cc) internal combustion engine, from a cylinder bore of 81 mm (3.19 in), and a piston stroke of 86.4 mm (3.40 in). Its cylinder block is constructed from grey cast iron, and its cylinder head is cast aluminium alloy, with additional post-production heat treatment. The crankcase contains a forged steel crankshaft which runs in five main bearings, and cast pistons with increased size gudgeon pins. It has two valves per cylinder (eight valves in total), which are operated by a toothed belt-driven forged steel single overhead camshaft (SOHC) via hydraulic valve lifters, with the valves being closed by two concentric valve springs. Charged air is cooled via an intercooler, and the operation and control of the engine, is managed by a Bosch Digifant engine control unit, which includes common rail electronic multi-point fuel injection and a knock sensor. It produced a maximum rated motive power output of 118 kW (160 PS; 158 bhp) at 5,800 rpm, and could generate a turning force torque of 225 N⋅m (166 lb⋅ft) at 4,000 rpm.

Although based on an existing Volkswagen Group engine from their EA827 series, it underwent so many modifications that it is usually regarded as a separate powerplant from others which the group produced. It was named after the "G-Lader" magnesium-cased supercharger that it was mated to - this supercharger had a 60 mm (2.36 in) diameter inlet, hence the "G60" moniker. It utilized a side-mounted intercooler (SMIC), positioned in front of the left front wheel, to lower the temperature of the compressed charged engine intake air.

The G60 engine was developed from an earlier, smaller version called the G40 based on their EA111 series. This engine displaced 1.3 L (1,272 cc) from a bore of 75 mm (2.95 in) and a stroke of 72 mm (2.83 in). The G40's supercharger had an inlet diameter of 40 mm (1.57 in), hence the "G40" name. The engine produced a maximum power of 85 kW (116 PS; 114 bhp) at 5,500 rpm, and torque of 150 N⋅m (111 lb⋅ft) at 3,500 rpm.

== Applications ==
The original G40 was used in the Mk2 Volkswagen Polo Coupé GT G40. The G40 engine could propel it to a top speed of 196 km/h (121.8 mph).

The larger G60 engine debuted in August 1988 in the B3 Volkswagen Passat G60 saloon, and the Mk2 Volkswagen Golf G60 hatchback. In the Golf G60, it was capable of propelling the car from a standstill to 100 km/h (62 mph) in 7.8 seconds, reaching a top speed of 216 km/h (134.2 mph).

A month later, in September 1988, the Volkswagen Corrado G60 was released. Performance figures for the Corrado G60 state a 0 - 100 km/h (62 mph) time of 8.3 seconds and a top speed of 225 km/h (139.8 mph).

In the United States, the G60 engine was used only in the Corrado, and this was dropped in 1992 in favour of the newer, more powerful VR6 engine.

A limited-production, four-wheel drive Syncro variant of the Golf G60, called the Golf Rallye was also powered by the eight-valve G60, but the engine was reduced to 1.8 L (1,763 cc) for sports homologation purposes. It included a larger intercooler which is mounted across the full width of the radiator. Power remained at 118 kW (160 PS; 158 bhp).

A 16-valve G60 engine was used in the ultra-rare Golf Limited, of which only 71 were produced by VW Motorsport, all with four-wheel drive. Power was raised to 154 kW (209 PS; 207 bhp), and the car could now accelerate from 0 - 100 km/h (62 mph) in 6.4 seconds, reaching a top speed of 247 km/h (153.5 mph).

The G60 engine, like any supercharged or turbocharged engine, was sensitive to high air temperatures, so engine performance very much depended on the weather conditions. Some models, like the Golf Rallye, or even some variants of the Golf G60, had a bigger, better-placed intercooler, resulting in increased, and more consistent performance compared to the standard placed intercooler.

Technologies found in the G40 and G60 engines have subsequently been used in other Volkswagen engines. They first used this technology with turbochargers in their Turbodiesel 'TD' engines. This evolved into their Turbocharged Direct Injection 'TDI' diesel engines.

== VW engine ID codes ==
All Volkswagen G-Lader internal combustion engines are inline four-cylinder SOHC designs, operate on the four-stroke cycle petrol engines with Bosch Digifant electronic multi-point fuel injection, are water-cooled, and use a G-Lader supercharger:

Engine ID code	Displacement	Valvetrain	Max. power	Max. torque	Applications	Years installed
G40 PY	1.3 L (1,272 cc)	SOHC 8v	85 kW (116 PS; 114 bhp) @ 5,500 rpm	150 N⋅m (111 lb⋅ft) @ 3,500 rpm	VW Polo Mk2 GT G40	08/86-07/94
G60 1H	1.8 L (1,763 cc)	SOHC 8v	118 kW (160 PS; 158 bhp) @ 5,800 rpm	225 N⋅m (166 lb⋅ft) @ 4,000 rpm	VW Golf Mk2 G60	08/88-07/89
G60 PG	1.8 L (1,781 cc)	SOHC 8v	110 kW (150 PS; 148 bhp)		VW Passat (B3) G60	08/88-07/89
G60 PG	1.8 L (1,781 cc)	SOHC 8v	118 kW (160 PS; 158 bhp) @ 5,800 rpm	225 N⋅m (166 lb⋅ft) @ 4,000 rpm	VW Golf Mk2 G60; VW Passat (B3) G60; VW Corrado G60	08/88-07/91; 08/88-07/93; 09/88-07/93
G60 3G	1.8 L (1,781 cc)	DOHC 16v	154 kW (210 PS; 207 bhp) @ 6,300 rpm	247 N⋅m (182 lb⋅ft) @ 5,000 rpm	VW Golf Mk2 Limited; Syncro 4WD	1990

== See also ==
- list of Volkswagen Group petrol engines
- list of Volkswagen Group diesel engines
- list of discontinued Volkswagen Group petrol engines
- list of discontinued Volkswagen Group diesel engines
- list of North American Volkswagen engines
- Wasser boxer
- Suction Diesel Injection (SDI)
- BlueMotion
- list of Volkswagen Group platforms
