= List of North American Volkswagen engines =

This list of North American Volkswagen engines details internal combustion engines found in the Volkswagen Passenger Cars and Volkswagen Commercial Vehicles marques, as sold in the North American markets.

Volkswagen Group engines are not widely known by "engine families" in the same way some other manufacturers do. VW Group engines are commonly known by the type of fuel they use, their displacement, and their rated motive power output. VW Group does have names of engine series, and individual engines are identified by an "ID code" (early codes were one or two letters/numbers, later IDs were generally three letters, and their very latest engines now use four letters) - but they have been known to apply many different ID codes to seemingly identical engines.

== Diesel engines ==
=== Indirect injection ===
==== 4-cylinder D ====
Volkswagen's inline-four-cylinder diesel engine (D) started out life as the gasoline-fueled EA827 series. The series ranges in size, from the original 1.5-litre, to the enlarged 1.9-litre. Some variants came with turbochargers - TurboDiesel (TD), and catalytic converters.

ID code- CK
1.5-litre D, 37 kW (50 PS; 50 hp) — 1976–1983 Volkswagen Rabbit
ID code- CS
1.6-litre D, 37 kW (50 PS; 50 hp) — 1981–1982 Volkswagen T2 Vanagon
ID code- CR, JK, ME
1.6-litre D, 40 kW (54 PS; 54 hp) — 1980–1992 Volkswagen Rabbit, Volkswagen Golf, Volkswagen Jetta
ID code- 1V
1.6-litre TD, 44 kW (60 PS; 59 hp) — 1991–1992 Volkswagen Jetta ECODiesel (TurboDiesel with standard non-Turbo injector pump. Catalytic converter has nothing to do with it being an "EcoDiesel" )
ID code- CY, MF
1.6-litre TD, 51 kW (69 PS; 68 hp) — 1981–1991 Volkswagen Rabbit, Volkswagen Jetta, Volkswagen Quantum TurboDiesel
ID code- AAZ
1.9-litre TD, 55 kW (75 PS; 74 hp) — 1992–1999 Volkswagen Golf, Volkswagen Jetta, Volkswagen Passat TurboDiesel

==== 5-cylinder D ====
ID code- AAB
2.4-litre D, 57 kW (77 PS; 76 hp) — 1993–1998 Volkswagen Eurovan

=== Direct injection ===
Currently, all diesel engines offered by Volkswagen Group are direct injection (DI). This engine started as a straight-five-cylinder Audi diesel in 1989 (itself derived from the EA827 series), but got reduced to an inline-four-cylinder for Volkswagens use. It is related (through several evolutions of engine families) to the EA827 series, indirect-injection diesels, 16 valves, and five-cylinder gasoline engines. Naturally aspirated direct-injection variants are known as Suction Diesel Injection, abbreviated to SDI. Many are offered with a turbocharger, and known as Turbocharged Direct Injection (TDI).

==== 4-cylinder DI ====
ID code- 1Z, AHU, ALH
1.9-litre TDI, 66 kW (90 PS; 89 hp) — 1996–2003 Volkswagen Golf, Volkswagen Jetta, Volkswagen New Beetle, Volkswagen Passat
ID code- ATD, BEW, BRM
1.9-litre TDI, 74 kW (101 PS; 99 hp) — 2004–2006 Volkswagen Jetta, Volkswagen New Beetle
ID code- BHW
2.0-litre TDI, 100 kW (136 PS; 134 hp) — 2003–2005 Volkswagen Passat (Pumpe Düse (PD))
ID code- CBE
2.0-litre TDI, 103 kW (140 PS; 138 hp) — 2008–2009 Volkswagen Jetta

ID CODE - 2009-2014 CJAA 2.0L TDI 140HP jetta, golf, bettle, jetta sportwagen

ID code- CRU
2.0-litre TDI, 110 kW (150 PS; 148 hp) — 2015–present Volkswagen Golf

==== 6-cylinder DI ====
ID code- CAR
3.0-litre V6 TDI, 171 kW (232 PS; 229 hp) — 2008–present Volkswagen Touareg V6 TDI

==== 10 cylinder DI ====
ID code- BKW, BLE
4.9-litre V10 TDI, 230 kW (313 PS; 308 hp) — 2003–2005 Volkswagen Touareg V10 TDI (Pumpe Düse (PD))
ID code- BWF
5.0-litre V10 TDI, 230 kW (313 PS; 308 hp) — 2006–present Volkswagen Touareg V10 TDI (Pumpe Düse (PD))

== Gasoline engines ==
=== 4-cylinder ===
==== Air-cooled ====
ID code- B
1.6-litre, 35 kW (48 PS; 47 hp) — 1967–1970 Volkswagen Type 2
ID code- CA, CB
1.7-litre, 49 kW (67 PS; 66 hp) — 1971–1973 Volkswagen Type 2
ID code- W, EA
1.7-litre, 59 kW (80 PS; 79 hp) — 1969–1974 Volkswagen Type 4 412
ID code- AP, AW
1.8-litre, 50 kW (68 PS; 67 hp) — 1973–1975 Volkswagen Type 2
ID code- ED
1.8-litre, 51 kW (69 PS; 68 hp) — 1974–1975 Volkswagen Type 2
ID code- EC
1.8-litre, 56 kW (76 PS; 75 hp) — 1973–1974 Volkswagen Type 4 412
ID code- CJ, CV, GD, GE
2.0-litre, 51 kW (69 PS; 68 hp) — 1976–1982 Volkswagen Type 2, Volkswagen Vanagon

==== Wasserboxer ====
The Volkswagen Wasserboxer engine is a water-cooled four-cylinder boxer engine, based on the air-cooled design. It was solely used in the 1983–1991 Volkswagen Vanagon.

ID code- DH
1.9-litre, 60 kW (82 PS; 80 hp), Digijet injection, 1983–1985
ID code- MV
2.1-litre, 70 kW (95 PS; 94 hp), Digifant II injection, 1985–1991

==== EA827 series ====
Known classically as the "counterflow 8 valve", the EA827 engine series is the root of most of Volkswagen's engines in the 1970s, 1980s and 1990s. It started as an Audi-designed engine and spawned straight-five-cylinder, diesel, crossflow, turbo, supercharged, and 16 valve variants. While mostly retired, the "second cousin" of the EA827 is still alive, known as the TDI.

===== 1.5 litre =====
ID code- FX
1.5-litre, 46 kW (63 PS; 62 hp) — 1977–1980 Volkswagen Rabbit (carburettor)
ID code- FG
1.5-litre, 55 kW (75 PS; 74 hp) — 1974–1975 Volkswagen Rabbit, Volkswagen Scirocco
ID code- EH, EN
1.5-litre, 57 kW (77 PS; 76 hp) — 1977–1984 Volkswagen Rabbit, Volkswagen Jetta, Volkswagen Scirocco

===== 1.6 litre =====
ID code- FN
1.6-litre, 55 kW (75 PS; 74 hp) — 1975–1976 Volkswagen Rabbit, Volkswagen Scirocco
ID code- EE
1.6-litre, 60 kW (82 PS; 80 hp) — 1976–1977 Volkswagen Rabbit, Volkswagen Scirocco
ID code- YH, YG, EJ
1.6-litre, 61 kW (83 PS; 82 hp) — 1975–1980 Volkswagen Dasher, Volkswagen Rabbit, Volkswagen Jetta, Volkswagen Scirocco

===== 1.7 litre =====
ID code- JF
1.7-litre, 48 kW (65 PS; 64 hp) — 1982–1984 Volkswagen Rabbit
ID code- EN
1.7-litre, 57 kW (77 PS; 76 hp)/59 kW (80 PS; 79 hp) — 1980–1984 Volkswagen Rabbit, Volkswagen Jetta, Volkswagen Scirocco

===== 1.8 litre =====
ID code- UM
1.8-litre, 60 kW (82 PS; 80 hp) — 1986–1987 Volkswagen Fox
ID code- ABG
1.8-litre, 61 kW (83 PS; 82 hp) — 1990–1993 Volkswagen Fox
ID code- GX, JN, ACC
1.8-litre, 66 kW (90 PS; 89 hp) — 1983–present Volkswagen Quantum, Volkswagen Fox, Volkswagen Golf, Volkswagen Jetta
ID code- JH, MZ
1.8-litre, 70 kW (95 PS; 94 hp) — 1982–1989 Volkswagen Rabbit, Volkswagen Golf, Volkswagen Jetta, Volkswagen Scirocco
ID code- 2H
1.8-litre, 72 kW (98 PS; 97 hp) — 1989–1993 Volkswagen Golf Cabriolet
ID code- HT, RV
1.8-litre, 77 kW (105 PS; 103 hp) — 1984–1991 Volkswagen Golf, Volkswagen Jetta (RV: 1987–1992 Digifant II)
ID code- RD, PF
1.8-litre, 79 kW (107 PS; 106 hp) — 1985–1991 Volkswagen Golf, Volkswagen Jetta, (PF: 1987–1992 Digifant II)
ID code- PG
1.8-litre G60 (G-Lader supercharger), 118 kW (160 PS; 158 hp) — 1989–1993 Volkswagen Corrado, Volkswagen Passat

==== EA113 series ====
The EA113 engine is a derivative of the classic EA827 series. It includes a crossflow cylinder head instead of counterflow cylinder head.

ID code- ABA, AEG, AVH, AZG, BBW, BDC, BEV, BGD, AGG
2.0-litre, (1984 cc, Fuel Injected) 85 kW (116 PS; 114 hp) — 1992–present Volkswagen Golf, Volkswagen Jetta, Volkswagen Passat, Volkswagen New Beetle

==== 16-valve ====
The 16 valve Volkswagen engine is the same as the EA827 series, the only difference being the addition of piston cooling oil squirters, similar to the g60 block but with a 16 valve cylinder head attached.

ID code- PL
1.8-litre 16v, 95 kW (129 PS; 127 hp) — 1986–1989 Volkswagen Golf Mk2 GTI, Volkswagen Jetta Mk2, Volkswagen Scirocco
ID code- 9A
2.0-litre 16v, 100 kW (136 PS; 134 hp) — 1990–1993 Volkswagen Golf Mk2 GTI, Volkswagen Jetta Mk2, Volkswagen Passat B3

==== 1.8 T ====
Volkswagen's ubiquitous 1.8 T engine, wholly developed by Audi, also known as the 1.8 20vT, has seen many improvements over the years and is used in many Volkswagen vehicles. It is sometimes mounted longitudinally while at other times mounted transversely. Its cylinder head contains five valves per cylinder–a total of 20 valves, and all versions use a turbocharger.

ID code- AEB
1.8-litre T, 110 kW (150 PS; 148 hp) — 1997–1999 Volkswagen Passat (longitudinally mounted)
ID code- ATW
1.8-litre T, 110 kW (150 PS; 148 hp)? — 2000 Volkswagen Passat (longitudinally mounted)
ID code- AGU, APH, AWD, AWU, AWV, AWW, BKF
1.8-litre T, 110 kW (150 PS; 148 hp) — 1998–present Volkswagen Golf, Volkswagen Jetta, Volkswagen New Beetle (transversely mounted)
ID code- AWM
1.8-litre T, 125 kW (170 PS; 168 hp) — 2001–2005 Volkswagen Passat (longitudinally mounted)
ID code- AWP, BNU
1.8-litre T, 132 kW (179 PS; 177 hp) — 2001–present Volkswagen Jetta, Volkswagen New Beetle (transversely mounted)
ID code- AMU, BEA
1.8-litre T, 165 kW (224 PS; 221 hp) — 1999–2005 Audi TT Quattro (transversely mounted)

==== Fuel Stratified Injection ====
The latest development of this engine range. An all new cylinder head was needed for the Audi-developed Fuel Stratified Injection (FSI), which features cylinder-direct fuel injection straight into the combustion chambers. The result of needing to site both spark plug and fuel injector meant that the former five-valve layout had to be changed to a four-valve-per-cylinder arrangement. Like previous engines, where the T appears, it stands for forced induction, usually by a turbocharger.

ID code- CCT
2.0-litre FSI, 125 kW (170 PS; 168 hp) — 2008–present Volkswagen Tiguan, (transversely mounted)
ID code- BPY, CAW, CBF
2.0-litre TFSI, 147 kW (200 PS; 197 hp) — 2005–present Volkswagen Golf Mk5 GTI, Volkswagen Jetta Mk5 GLI, Volkswagen Eos, Volkswagen Passat B6, Volkswagen Tiguan, 2006-2008 Audi A3

=== 5-cylinder ===
Older Volkswagen inline-five-cylinder engines are an adaptation of the original Audi five-cylinder engine (for use in the Audi 4000-derived Quantum). Eurovan five-cylinders are a 2.5-litre non-crossflow 10-valve engine with an extra cylinder and balance rods added. Volkswagen most recently came out with a new five-cylinder developed (loosely) from half of a Lamborghini Gallardo V10 engine.

ID code- WE
2.1-litre, 79 kW (107 PS; 106 hp) — 1982–1983 Volkswagen Quantum
ID code- KM
2.1-litre, 85 kW (116 PS; 114 hp) — 1983–1985 Volkswagen Quantum
ID code- JT
2.2-litre, 89 kW (121 PS; 119 hp) — 1985–1988 Volkswagen Quantum
ID code- KX
2.23-litre, 88 kW (120 PS; 118 hp) — 1984–1988 Volkswagen Quantum
ID code- AAF, ACU
2.5-litre, 81 kW (110 PS; 109 hp) — 1991–1995 Volkswagen Eurovan
ID code- BGP, BGQ, BPR, BPS
2.5-litre, 110 kW (150 PS; 148 hp) — 2005–2011 Volkswagen Rabbit (Golf Mk5), Volkswagen Jetta Mk5, Volkswagen New Beetle
ID code- CBT, CBU
2.5-litre, 125 kW (170 PS; 168 hp) — 2007–2014 Volkswagen Beetle (A5), Volkswagen Golf Mk6, Volkswagen Jetta Mk5, Volkswagen Jetta Mk6 (2011-2013), Volkswagen Passat, 2009 Volkswagen Rabbit (Golf Mk5)

=== 6-cylinder ===
==== V6 engine ====
Volkswagen used a conventional V6 engine in the B5 Passat, because the drivetrain was longitudinally mounted. Like the original VR6, it was 2.8 litres in size, but unlike the VR6, it was a true 90-degree V6, and had 30 valves with continuously variable intake valve timing.

ID code- AMM
2.4-litre V6, 120 kW (163 PS; 161 hp) — 2003–2005 Volkswagen Passat B5
ID code- AHA, AMX, ATQ
2.8-litre V6, 142 kW (193 PS; 190 hp) — 1997–2005 Volkswagen Passat B5

==== VR6 engine ====
Volkswagen's potent VR6 engine was originally conceived as a diesel engine, but later found itself as a gasoline engine. This engine was designed and created so that a six cylinder engine could fit within an engine bay of car originally designed for an inline-four engine.

ID code- AES
2.8-litre VR6, 103 kW (140 PS; 138 hp) — 1996–2000 Volkswagen Eurovan
ID code- AAA
2.8-litre VR6, 128 kW (174 PS; 172 hp) — 1994–1999 Volkswagen Corrado, Volkswagen Golf, Volkswagen Jetta, Volkswagen Passat
ID code- AFP
2.8-litre VR6, 130 kW (177 PS; 174 hp) — 1999.5–2002 Volkswagen Golf, Volkswagen Jetta
ID code- BDF
2.8-litre VR6 24v, 147 kW (200 PS; 197 hp) — 2001–2004 Volkswagen Jetta, 2002–2004 Volkswagen Golf
ID code- AXK
2.8-litre VR6 24v, 150 kW (204 PS; 201 hp) — 2000–2003 Volkswagen Eurovan
ID code- BAA, BMX
3.2-litre VR6 24v, 162 kW (220 PS; 217 hp) — 2003–2006 Volkswagen Touareg
ID code- BJS
3.2-litre VR6 24v, 177 kW (241 PS; 237 hp) — 2004 Golf Mk4 R32
ID code- BUB, CBR
3.2-litre VR6 24v, 184 kW (250 PS; 247 hp) — 2006–present Volkswagen Eos, Golf Mk5 R32, Audi MK1/MK2 TT 3.2
ID code- BHK, BHL, BLV
3.6-litre FSI VR6 24v, 206 kW (280 PS; 276 hp) — 2005–present Volkswagen Passat B6 (with Fuel Stratified Injection)

=== 8-cylinder ===
==== W8 engine ====
Volkswagen has only built a single W8 engine, for the 2001–2004 Passat. It was a test bed for the W engine technology, which made it into the W12 (listed below), and the W16, as used in the 406 km/h (252 mph) Bugatti Veyron EB16.4.

ID code- BDP
4.0-litre W8, 202 kW (275 PS; 271 hp) — 2001–2004 Volkswagen Passat B5 W8

==== V8 engine ====
Volkswagen has only used one fundamental design for its V8 engine - an all-aluminium alloy construction, but with evolutions in engine management and fueling systems. Like its other engines, increases in power necessitated new engine ID codes. Only the Phaeton and Touareg in the Volkswagen Passenger Cars marque have used a V8 engine.

ID code- AXQ
4.2-litre V8, 228 kW (310 PS; 306 hp) — 2002–2007 Volkswagen Touareg
ID code- BGH, BGJ
4.2-litre V8, 246 kW (334 PS; 330 hp) — 2003–2006 Volkswagen Phaeton
ID code- BAR
4.2-litre FSI V8, 257 kW (349 PS; 345 hp) — 2007–present Volkswagen Touareg (with Fuel Stratified Injection - FSI)

=== 12-cylinder ===
==== W12 engine ====
Volkswagen has used only one W12 engine in their vehicles (though shared with the Audi A8). An increase in power in 2006 saw a new engine ID code.

ID code- BAP
6.0-litre W12, 309 kW (420 PS; 414 hp) — 2003–2005 Volkswagen Phaeton W12
ID code- BRP
6.0-litre W12, 331 kW (450 PS; 444 hp) — 2005–2006 Volkswagen Phaeton W12

== See also ==
- list of Volkswagen Group petrol engines
- list of Volkswagen Group diesel engines
- list of discontinued Volkswagen Group petrol engines
- list of discontinued Volkswagen Group diesel engines
- Volkswagen Wasserboxer engine
- Turbocharged Direct Injection (TDI)
- Suction Diesel Injection (SDI)
- VR6 engine
- BlueMotion
- list of Volkswagen Group platforms
- list of Volkswagen Group factories
