= Scroll-type supercharger =

Type of supercharger

An animation of the operation of a scroll-type supercharger. Air is confined between the two spirals and is compressed as it is forced towards the centre. In automotive application, the spirals would have far fewer turns.

The scroll-type supercharger is a scroll compressor used as a positive displacement orbiting-spiral supercharger. It is a compromise between the more rugged rotating lobe, and the more efficient sliding vane type superchargers, and is considered to offer the highest potential in regard to efficiency, noise and pressure fluctuation.

== History ==
The basic concept of the scroll-type supercharger was invented by Léon Creux of France in 1905, originally for aircraft use, though Creux did consider it as a possible form of steam engine. However, Creux's supercharger failed due to the relatively poor casting techniques available at the time. This type of supercharger has not seen widespread use in the aviation role, but has been used on a small number of automotive applications.

== Description ==
The moving parts of the supercharger is a disc-shaped displacer with identical spirals (or scrolls) projecting from each side, and manufactured from light alloy to reduce inertia. A pair of fixed scrolls supported by the end walls of the compressor chamber are interleaved with the moving scrolls. Rather than rotating, the displacer is driven in an orbital motion to create a pumping action between the pairs of scrolls.

Air is pulled into the device when the moving scrolls are at their furthest from the fixed scrolls, leaving a large gap. As the shaft rotates the gap closes, and the point of widest opening rotates to a point further "into" the charger. As the process continues the gap eventually ends up on the middle of the housing, at the point where the higher pressure air exhausts into the engine. The scrolls are shaped so the gap slowly decreases in size as it moves to the centre, thereby compressing the air.

The edges of the scrolls are sealed by strip-type seals, while the supercharger's main shaft bearings use radial seals to prevent the charge air from becoming contaminated with oil.

== Volkswagen G-Lader ==
The most common and well known scroll-type supercharger is the G-Lader (Lader is German for charger), designed by Volkswagen for use in a version of the Mk2 Polo called the GT G40. Launched first as a limited batch of about 500 cars in 1987, most were sold to Volkswagen workers. A normal production version of the G40 was launched as part of the Mk2F range. The name comes from the "G" shape of its compression channels. It was mounted on a 1,272 cc (77.6 cu in) petrol engine, which offered performance about that of a 2 L (122 cu in) naturally aspirated engine.

A similar, but larger G60 became available in the Volkswagen Corrado during the early 1990s, and was also available in limited numbers in the Volkswagen Passat and Volkswagen Golf. The G60 won International Engine of the Year when it was introduced in 1989.

The "40" and "60" denote the displacer scroll width in millimetres.

All supercharger types benefit from the use of an intercooler to get rid of the heat produced during compression, and therefore help increase the density of the charged air.

== See also ==
- Scroll compressor
