= Volkswagen Polo Mk2 =

Volkswagen Polo Mk2 (86C)
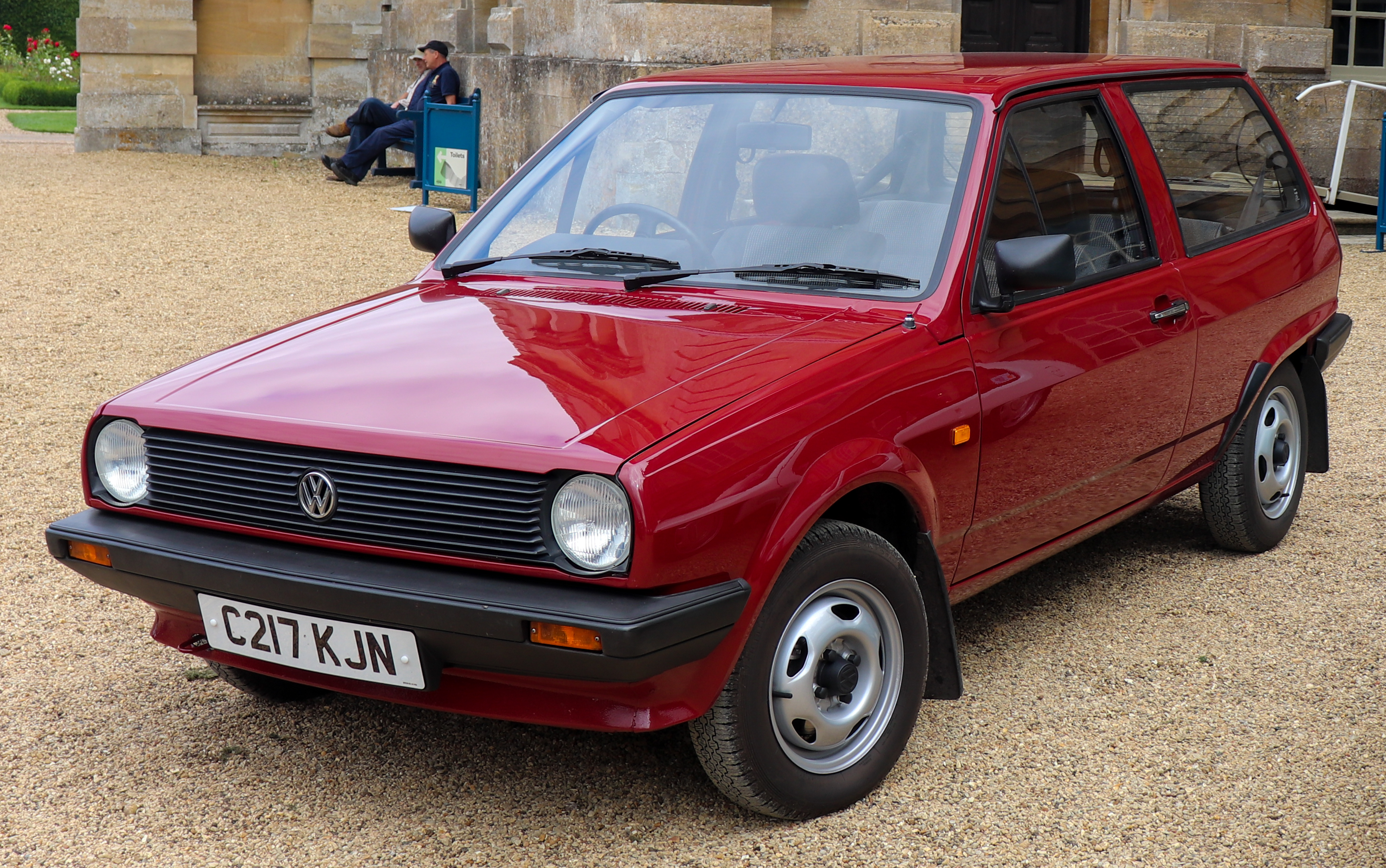

Overview
- Manufacturer: Volkswagen
- Also called: Volkswagen Derby/Polo Classic (saloon)
- Production: October 1981 – July 1994
- Assembly: Germany: Wolfsburg; Germany: Zwickau (Mosel); Spain: Pamplona

Body and chassis
- Class: Supermini (B)
- Body style: 3-door estate (Hatchback or "Steilheck"); 3-door fastback ("Coupé"); 2-door saloon
- Layout: Front-engine, front-wheel-drive
- Platform: Volkswagen Group A02 platform

Powertrain
- Engine: petrol: 1,043 cc GL/HZ I4; 1,093 cc HB I4; 1,272 cc HH/MH/GK/3F/AAV I4; 1,272 cc PY G-Lader I4; diesel: 1,272 cc MN I4; 1,398 cc 1W I4

Dimensions
- Wheelbase: 2,335 mm (91.9 in)
- Length: 3,655 mm (143.9 in) (hatchback, 1981–1990); 3,975 mm (156.5 in) (saloon, 1981–1990); 3,765 mm (148.2 in) (hatchback, 1990–1994); 3,725 mm (146.7 in) (coupé, 1990–1994); 4,030 mm (158.7 in) (saloon, 1990–1994)
- Width: 1,570 mm (61.8 in); 1,590 mm (62.6 in) (GT)
- Height: 1,355 mm (53.3 in)
- Curb weight: 736–804 kg (1,623–1,773 lb)

Chronology
- Predecessor: Volkswagen Polo Mk1
- Successor: Volkswagen Polo Mk3

The Volkswagen Polo Mk2 is the second generation of the Volkswagen Polo supermini. It was produced from late 1981 until 1994. It received a major facelift in 1990 and was available in three different body styles, including a distinctive kammback-styled hatchback, nicknamed "breadvan" in the UK but referred to as a Steilheck ("steep tail") in Germany. The sedan version typically received the name of Volkswagen Derby.

== Initial release ==
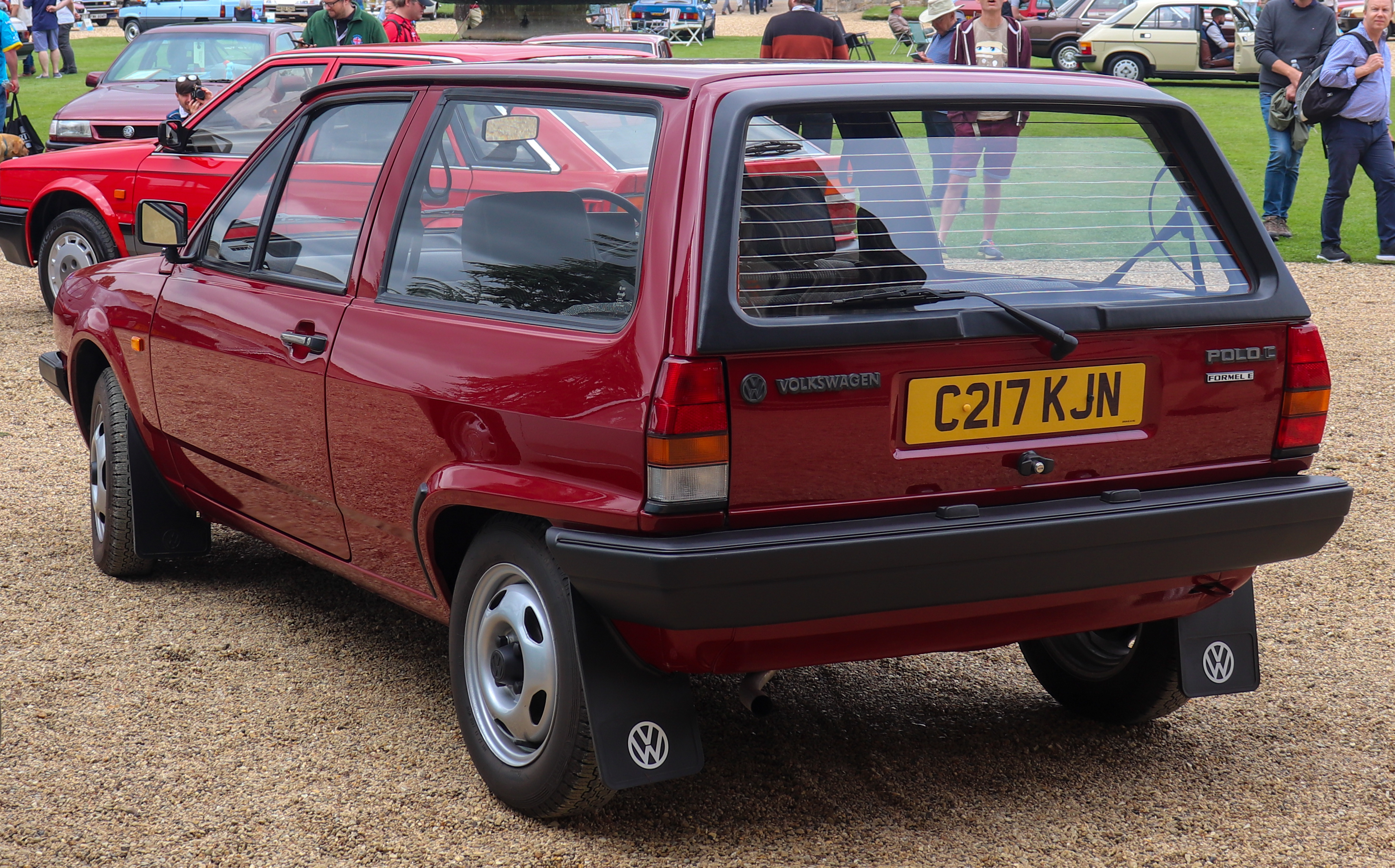
Volkswagen Polo Hatchback rear

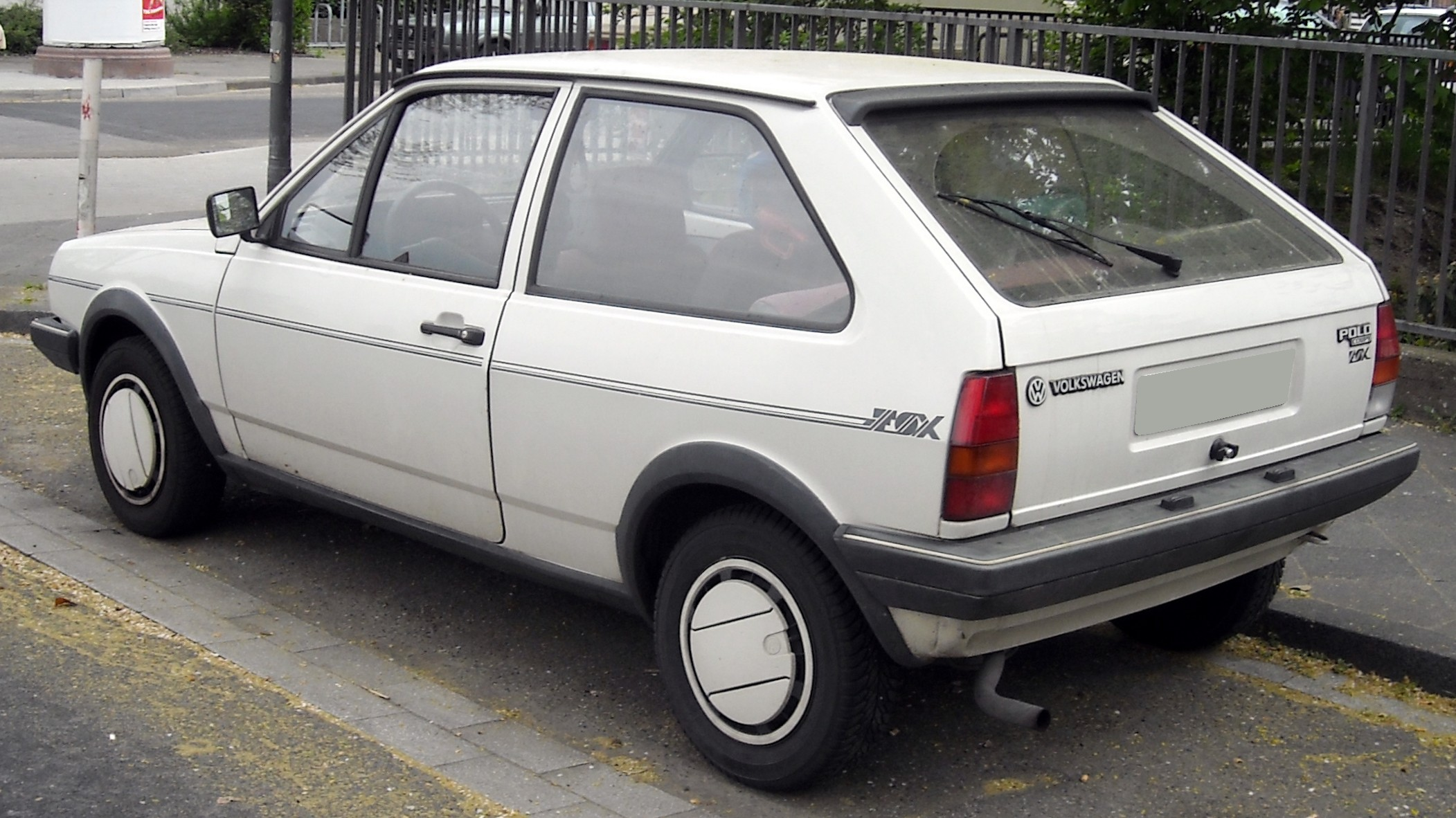
Volkswagen Polo Coupé (rear view)

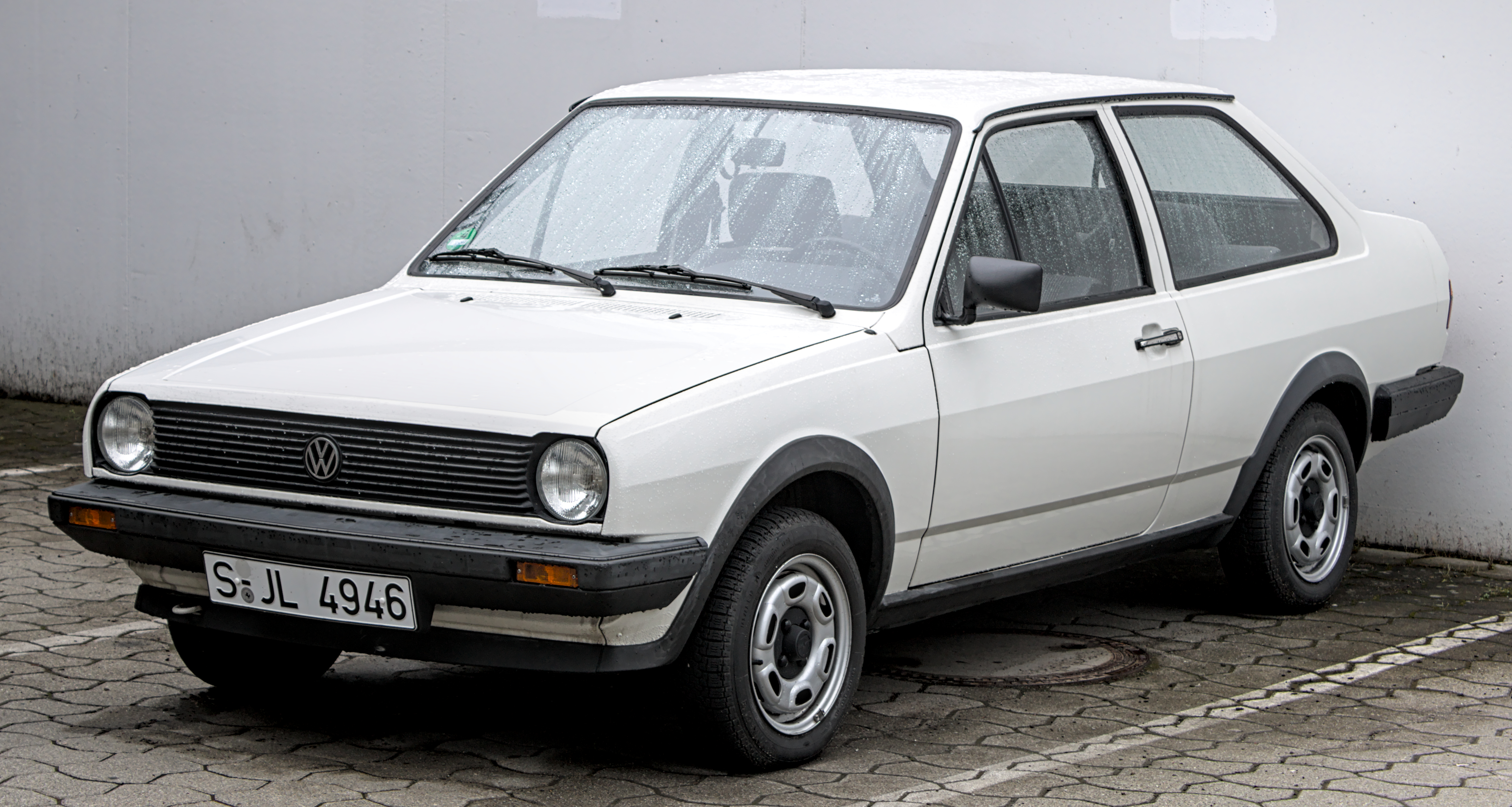
Volkswagen Polo Classic (saloon)

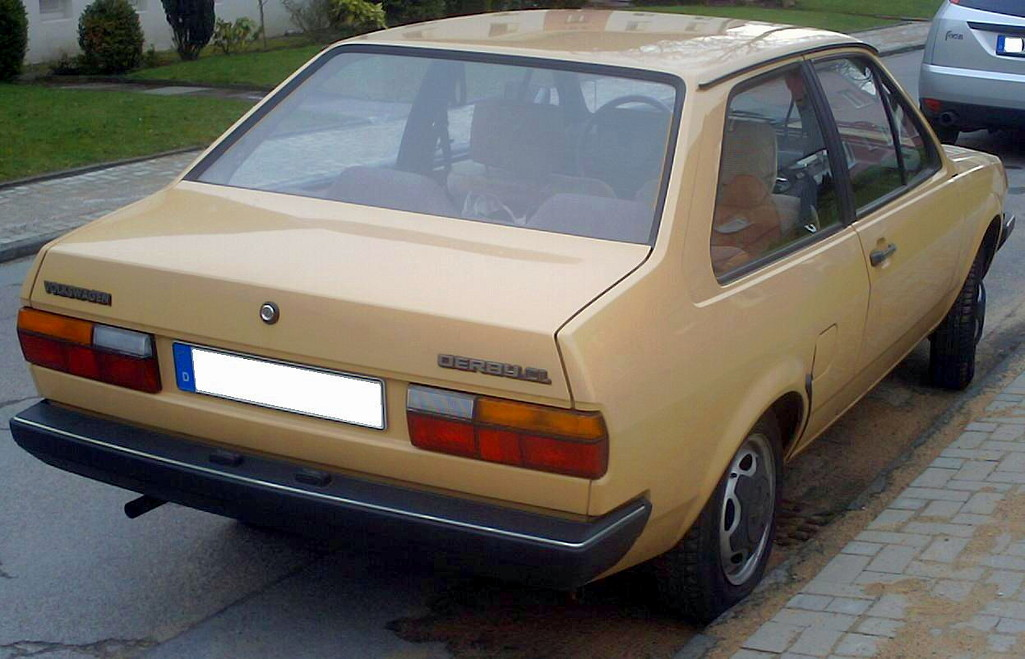
Volkswagen Derby saloon (rear view)

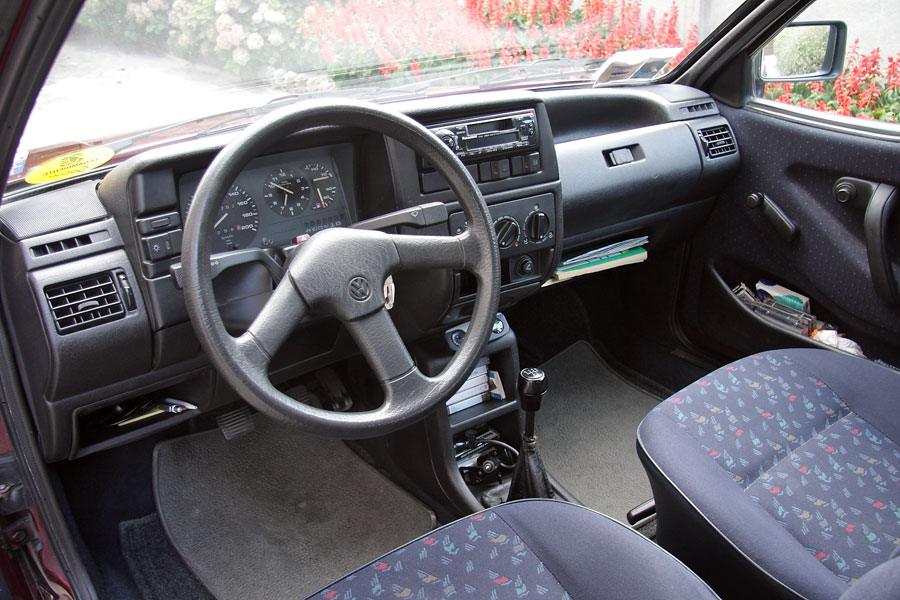
Interior (facelift model)

A revised Polo model (known as the Mark 2 or Mark II, internally designated Typ 86C) was introduced in October 1981, with the hatchback seeing a major design change to a steep (almost vertical) rear window which made the car more resemble a estate, as well as a saloon version, badged in most markets as the Derby. A "Coupé" that more resembled the styling of the Mk1 Polo was added to the range in 1983 as the radical styling of the new hatchback design was not welcomed by all. Using the roof panel and the side windows from the Derby saloon, the "Coupé" was still technically a 3-door like the new hatchback design. It was originally only available with the more powerful engines (55 and 75 PS), but after a mild facelift in August 1984, the base 40 PS (29 kW) unit was also made available.

The saloon version was no longer called the Derby in all countries, and was changed to the Polo Classic in all markets from 1984. Production began in Spain with Volkswagen's initial collaboration with SEAT in the early 1980s which saw the Polo beginning production in Pamplona on April 27, 1984 and the Polo Classic followed in 1985. The hatchback was the lightest bodystyle, 5 kg (11 lb) lighter than the coupé and 15 kg (33 lb) lighter than the three-box sedan. - this ultimately leading up to Volkswagen's full takeover of SEAT in 1986.

At launch, the 1093 cc (standard and Formel E variant) and 1272 cc engines were carried over from the polo and derby mk1. A new 1043 cc unit replaced the previous 895 cc unit of the mk1 and was the first polo engine to use a Heron cylinder head. It also featured a higher compression ratio over the outgoing 895 cc unit which improved the engines torque. The 1272 cc unit was reserved for the top-spec GL saloon at launch until 1983 when two new 1272 cc units were developed. These new units also featured the same Heron head design of the 1043 cc engine and higher compression ratios and were available in all body styles depending on the market.

In 1986, the Polo received numerous technical improvements; amongst many other minor updates, the engines were changed to lower maintenance hydraulic tappets, new camshafts and valve gear and an automatic choke; the 1043 cc engine replaced the 1093 cc, and in some markets the 1.3-litre engine was available with fuel injection and equipped with a catalytic converter. In 1984 an all-new 1.3-litre engine was introduced, which was used in various generations of Polo until 1996. The Polo received some changes in August 1984, including a new dashboard, a bigger fuel tank, and more standard equipment. The GL was discontinued with the CL essentially taking its place. All models now received round rather than the earlier square headlights. These changes helped keep the Polo remain competitive in an increasingly competitive market, which had seen the arrival of the Opel Corsa (Vauxhall Nova in the UK) during 1982, and of three more all-new competitors - the Fiat Uno, Nissan Micra and Peugeot 205 - in 1983, as well as an updated Ford Fiesta in the same year and the new Renault 5 a year later. By the time an all-new Fiesta was launched in early 1989, the Polo was the only popular European supermini to lack a four- or five-door version, and had also gained a new competitor, the Citroën AX, which was also available with five doors by the end of the decade.

Available with the 1093 cc engine the Coupé featured additions such as sporting seats trim, wheel arch extensions, rear spoiler, low profile tyres and a rev counter, as well as the round headlights which were later fitted across the range. The GL featured a 60 PS (44 kW) engine. In August 1982, for the 1983 model year, the first sporty Polo was introduced. The Polo Coupé GT received a 75 PS (55 kW) version of the 1.3-liter engine, as well as servo assisted brakes, twin headlights, a digital clock, sports seats, and a rev counter. The extra power (up by 25 percent) was the result of dished pistons containing the compression chambers, allowing for a flat cylinder head, providing higher and more even compression. While commonly referred to as a Heron head, Volkswagen called the design "HCS", for High Compression and Squish. The carburettor remained a twin-barrel one, and the only transmission at the time of introduction was a very long-geared four-speed manual. Other special models were introduced over the rest of the period of the Mark 2 production run including models such as the Twist, Parade and Country.

The UK market only ever received the 1.0, 1.1, and 1.3 versions of the Polo, but it was still one of the most popular imported cars there – frequently managing over 30,000 sales per year and peaking as the 11th best selling car there in 1983.

=== Polo G40 ===
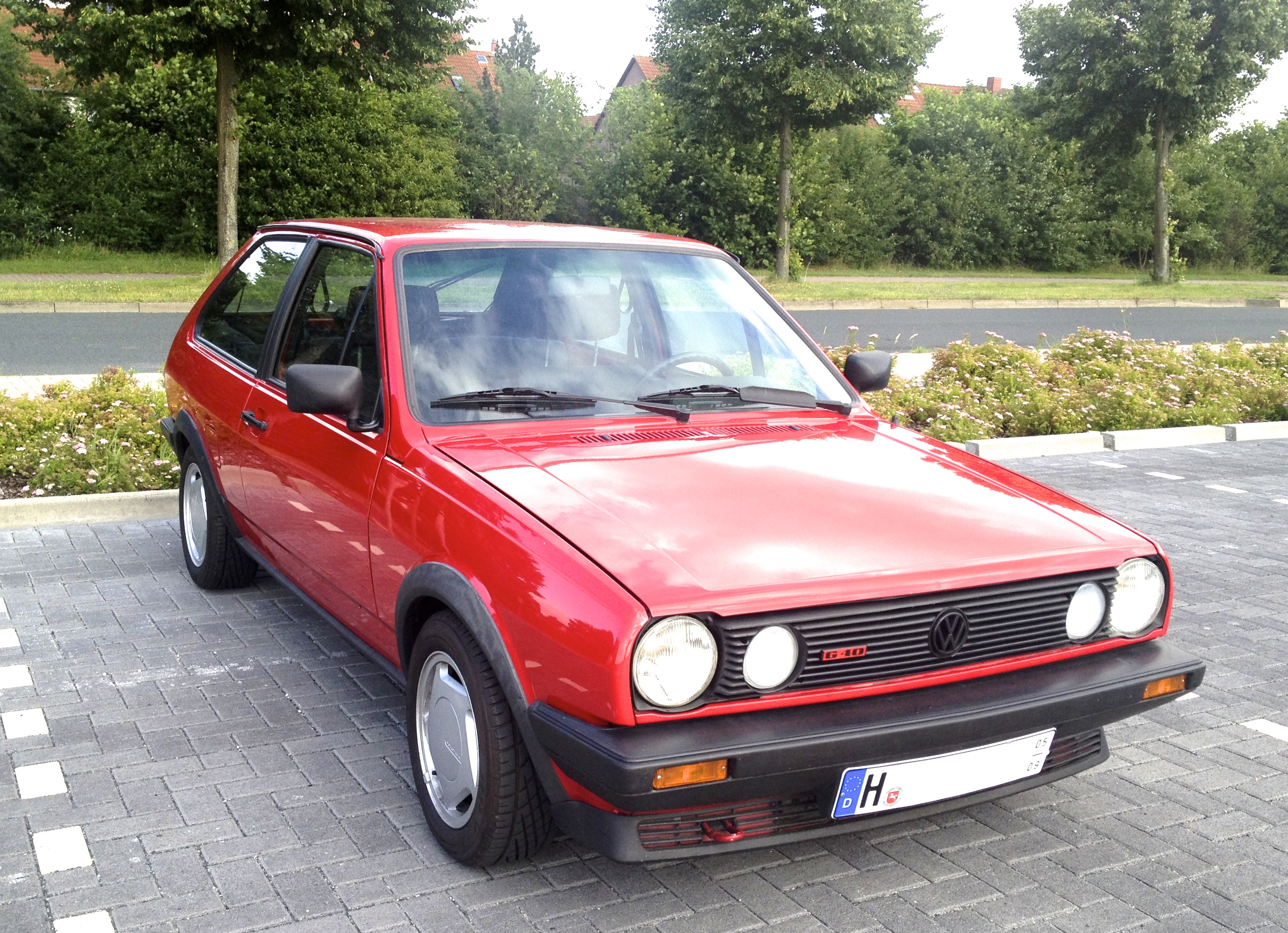
Polo Mk2 GT G40

The Mark 2 Polo was used extensively by Volkswagen to develop future innovations, for example supercharging. The supercharger-equipped GT G40 version was introduced in 1987, in LHD Coupe form only, first as a limited batch of about 500 cars, most of which were sold to VW workers (as a homologated version of the car for the G40 Cup race series) and later as a normal production version. This model featured the 1272 cc engine with a small bore G-Lader supercharger, giving 113 PS (83 kW) at 6000 rpm, as well as modified suspension and the bodywork of the "normal" GT Coupé. The car could reach 100 km/h (62 mph) in 8.1 secs from and had maximum speed of 196 km/h (122 mph) it was used by VW to set a number of world endurance speed records — such as the 1300 cc class records for speed over 24 hours and speed over a distance of 5000 km. A G-Lader would later be used on the larger and more technically challenging G60 engine used in the Golf and Corrado.

An extremely fuel-efficient two-cylinder diesel was prototyped in the mid-1980s with a G40 supercharger to overcome its small capacity, although this did not make production. A high-fuel-efficiency model which did make production was Formel E (E for Economy), introduced in 1983. This used a high-compression 1272 cc engine, longer gear ratios and an early-stop-start ignition system (called SSA) that would cut the engine when idle for more than two seconds to save fuel whilst temporarily stopped in traffic, and restart the engine when the gear lever was moved to the left in neutral. The system could be enabled or disabled by means of a toggle switch below the light switch. Similar systems were later used on the Volkswagen Golf Mk3. Similar systems were developed by other car manufacturers.

=== Engines ===
The Mark 2 was available with the following engines:

- 1,043 cc straight-4 petrol (1981–1994; in the UK from 1983)
- 1,093 cc straight-4 petrol (1981–1983)
- 1,272 cc straight-4 petrol (1981–1994)
- 1,272 cc straight-4 petrol with a Pierburg 2E3 carburettor producing 41 kW (55 hp) (1983–1990). Coupé S in UK, GT elsewhere in Europe
- 1,272 cc straight-4 petrol with multi-point fuel injection and equipped with a catalytic converter producing 55 kW (75 hp) (1991–1994). GT version only.
- 1,272 cc straight-4 supercharged petrol with 83 kW (113 hp). (GT G40 version 1987 only)
- 1,272 cc straight-4 diesel (1986–1990)
- 1,398 cc straight-4 diesel (August 1990 – 1994)

=== Trim levels ===
The VW Polo was available in six trim levels;

- Fox (1.0, 1.3 petrol, 1.3 diesel), from August 1984
- C (1.0, 1.1 petrol, 1.3 diesel)
- CL (1.0, 1.1, 1.3 petrol, 1.3 diesel)
- GL (1.1, 1.3 petrol, 1.3 diesel)
- GT (1.3 petrol)
- S (1.3 petrol)
- CX (1.0 petrol)

For the 1985 model year, the GL was dropped and the bargain limited edition "Fox" model was introduced in some markets. In the UK, the spartanly equipped Fox arrived in 1987, available only with a 1.0-litre engine. It was also sold with the 1.3 and as a diesel version in Europe. However, neither the 1.3 petrol nor the diesel engines were available in the UK. Otherwise, versions sold on the Continent were similar to their UK counterparts; this was the same for all Polo Mark 2 versions up to the launch of an all-new Polo in 1994.

== Facelift model ==
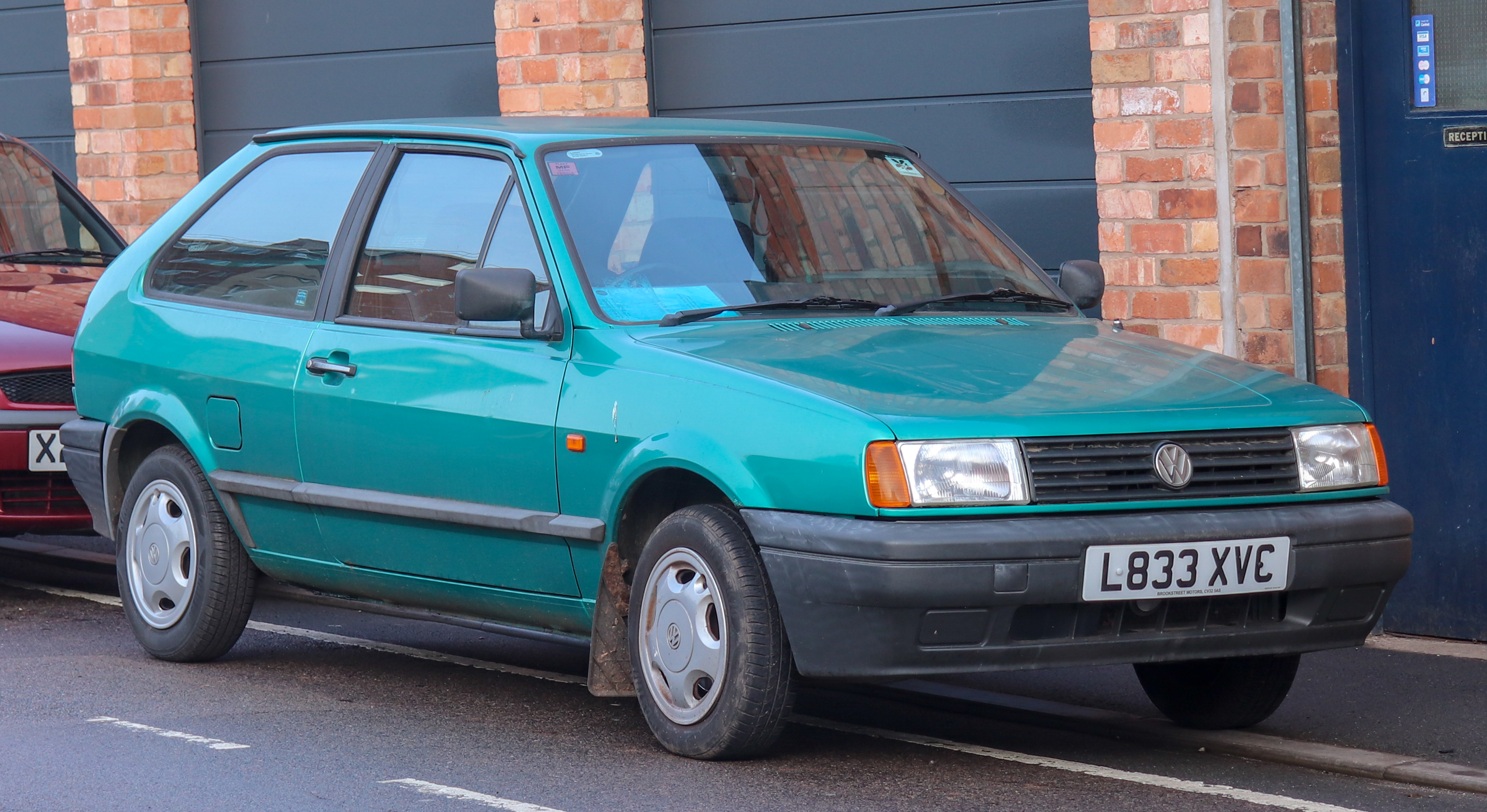

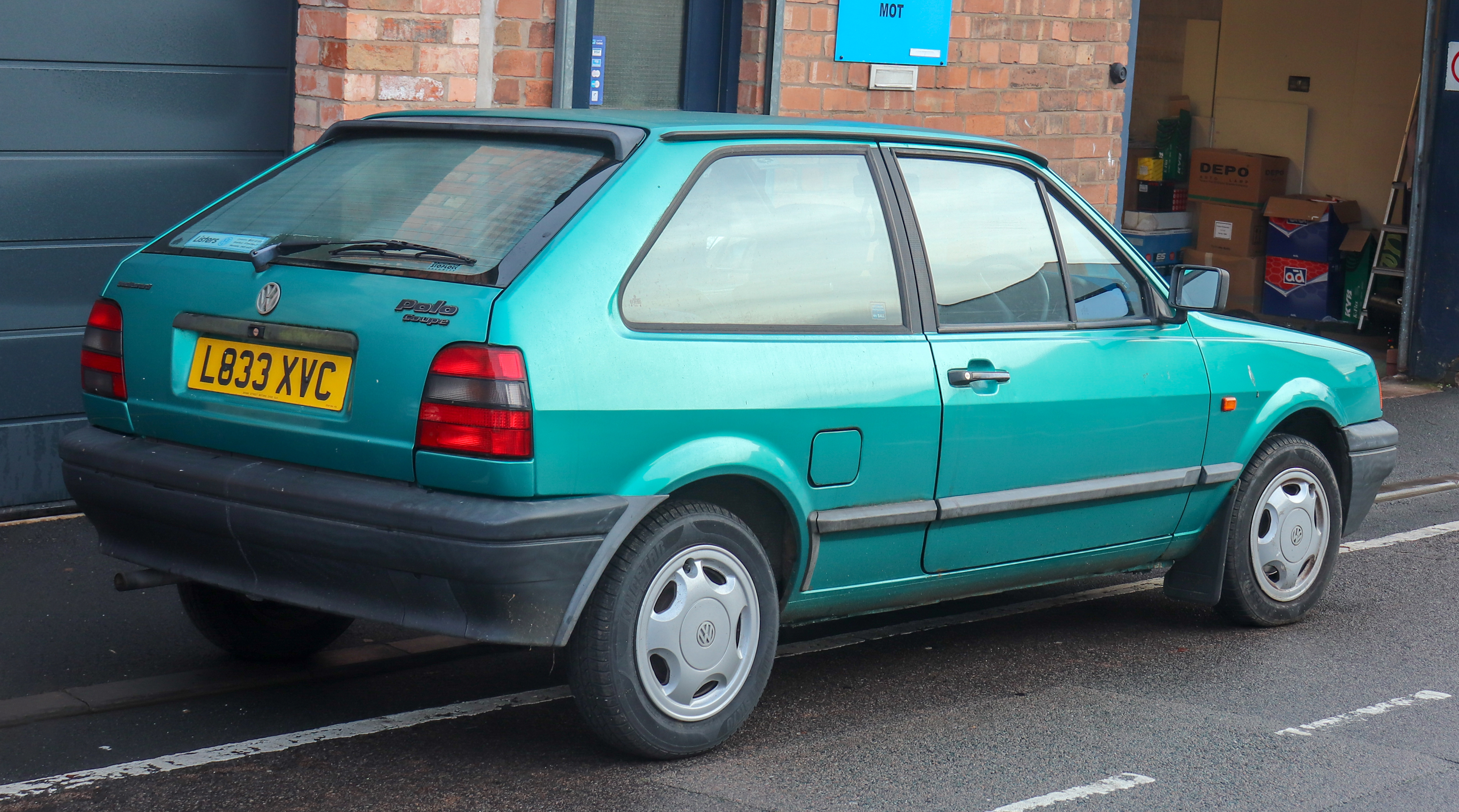
1990 facelift (3-door coupé)

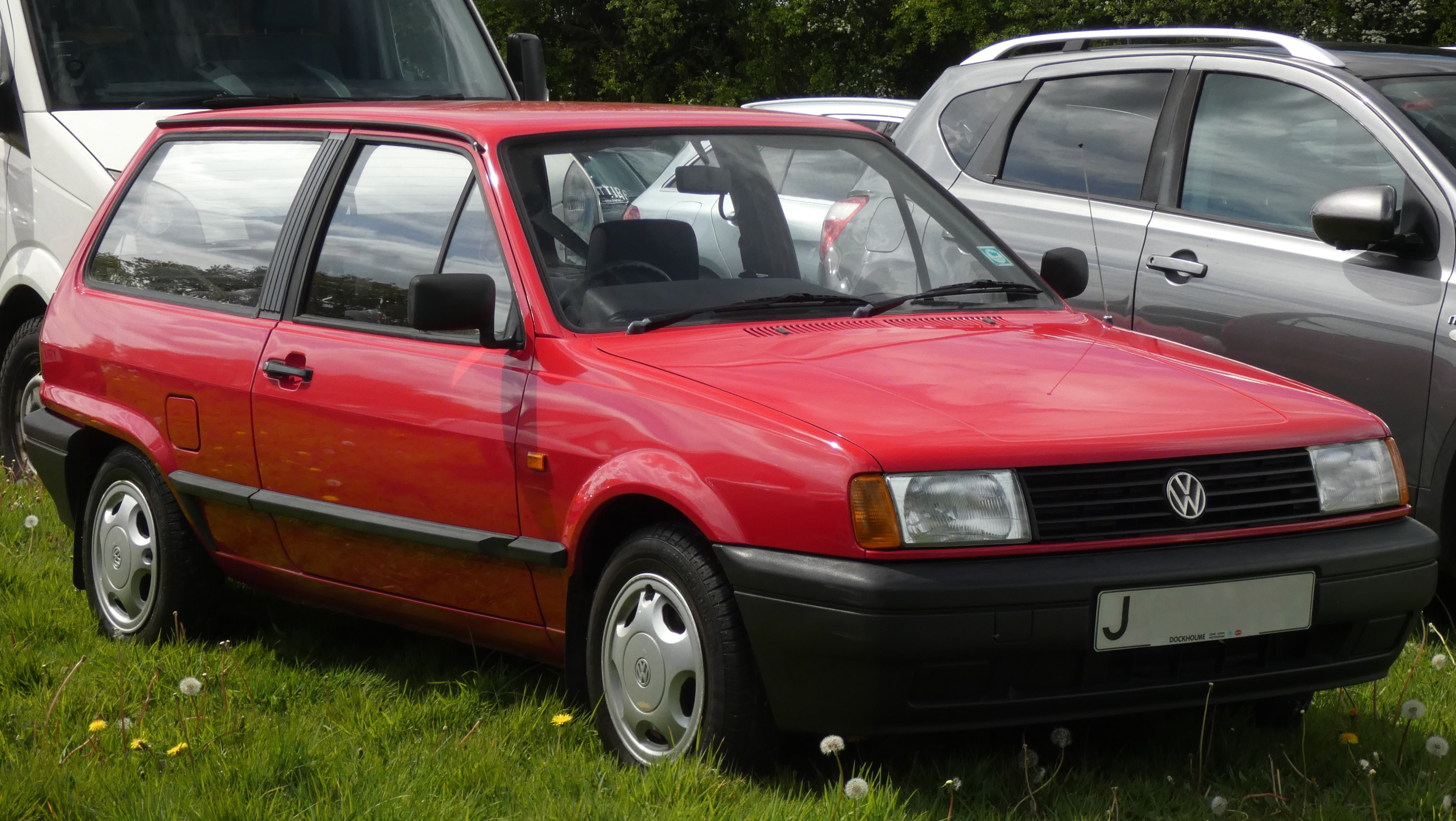
1990 facelift (3-door hatchback)

A facelift in October 1990, for the 1991 model year, (referred to unofficially as the Mark 2F or IIF) saw square headlights, bigger bumpers and a new interior (dash and door trim). The three different styles (hatchback, coupé hatchback and sedan) were maintained. The aerodynamics were improved by about ten percent; this was in part thanks to the new, more rounded front end, but other details such as the glued-in rear windshields on coupés and hatchbacks also had an impact. As well as the cosmetic differences, under the skin the car received modifications to the chassis and suspension as well as the addition of servo-assisted brakes to all models including right hand drive versions. The new Polo mostly kept the same four-cylinder engine but now as well as the carburetted 1.0 L, fuel injection models were available with single-point injection, and all engines came standard with a catalytic converter to combat tightening EU laws on automobile emissions. Carburetted models remained available for markets where unleaded fuel was harder to obtain or emissions were not prioritized. The carburetted Polo GT had a little bit more power, 77 PS (57 kW) at 6100 rpm.

The erstwhile Derby, now sold as the Polo Classic, was only produced in Spain, and ceased production in 1992. At this point, the Polo was terminally dated, with old-fashioned design solutions like having the fuse box in the engine room. It was also smaller than its direct competitors and it was only built with three doors. The follow-up model, the Mark 3 or Typ 6N version, was already well developed, but due to the steady sales numbers, production of the existing Polo models (hatchback and Coupé) was continued to 1994 in Wolfsburg and Spain. Volkswagen used the extra two years to revisit the Typ 6N and change the format slightly before introduction in 1994.

Soon after the launch of the Mark 2F, another sporting model was added to the range — a new version of the supercharged G40, now as a full production model in all markets rather than the limited batch of Mark 2 G40s. The engine used a slightly different version of the digifant injection system to allow the use of a catalytic converter, and produced 113 PS (83 kW), which gave 0–100 km/h figures of 8.6 seconds and a top speed of 196 kilometres per hour (122 mph). The car was lowered by 25 mm (1.0 in) over the standard Polo and featuring special edition Le Mans sports seats, similar exterior styling to the GT with the addition of a bee sting aerial and 5.5J X 13" BBS RA cross spoke alloy wheels. As with the previous model, VW Motorsport modified G40 Cup cars were sold for racing in a one-make series, the Volkswagen Polo G40 Cup. The reliability of these vehicles was hampered by early production mistakes and high maintenance costs — parts of the G-Lader can wear out quickly if unmaintained — which damaged the reputation of the supercharging concept. Volkswagen ended its experimentation with supercharged hot hatches at the end of the Polo 2F production run, due to high manufacturing costs and less than enthusiastic sales. The price was little less than that of the basic Golf GTI.

In 1992 VW released a limited number of special edition Polos, with special trim and a G40 engine and suspension. The "Genesis" G40 was made to special order only. A single right hand drive example found its way to the UK. This one-off model was a competition prize when the VW-sponsored Genesis tour reached its UK leg.

=== Trim levels ===
Trim levels were Fox, CL, GL, Boulevard and Genesis. The Fox was the entry-level model, only available with a 1.0-litre engine, but in Europe it had a 1.3-litre version. The very spartan Fox did not even receive side marker lights as standard.

== See also ==
- Volkswagen Polo for an overview of all models
- Volkswagen Polo Mk1
- Volkswagen Polo Mk3
- Volkswagen Polo Mk4
- Volkswagen Polo Mk5
- Volkswagen Polo Mk6

Preceded by Volkswagen Polo Mk1	Volkswagen Polo Mk2; 1981–1994	Succeeded by Volkswagen Polo Mk3
