= Naturally aspirated engine =

Type of internal combustion engine

Typical airflow in a four-stroke engine: In stroke #1, the pistons take in (aspirate) air to the combustion chamber through the opened inlet valve.

A naturally aspirated engine, also known as a normally aspirated engine, and abbreviated to N/A or NA, is an internal combustion engine in which air intake depends solely on atmospheric pressure and does not have forced induction through a turbocharger or a supercharger.

== Description ==
In a naturally aspirated engine, air for combustion (Diesel cycle in a diesel engine or specific types of Otto cycle in petrol engines, namely petrol direct injection) or an air/fuel mixture (traditional Otto cycle petrol engines), is drawn into the engine's cylinders by atmospheric pressure acting against a partial vacuum that occurs as the piston travels downwards toward bottom dead centre during the intake stroke. Owing to innate restriction in the engine's inlet tract, which includes the intake manifold, a small pressure drop occurs as air is drawn in, resulting in a volumetric efficiency of less than 100 percent—and a less than complete air charge in the cylinder. The density of the air charge, and therefore the engine's maximum theoretical power output, in addition to being influenced by induction system restriction, is also affected by engine speed and atmospheric pressure, the latter of which decreases as the operating altitude increases.

This is in contrast to a forced-induction engine, in which a mechanically driven supercharger or an exhaust-driven turbocharger is employed to facilitate increasing the mass of intake air beyond what could be produced by atmospheric pressure alone. Nitrous oxide can also be used to artificially increase the mass of oxygen present in the intake air. This is accomplished by injecting liquid nitrous oxide into the intake, which supplies significantly more oxygen in a given volume than is possible with atmospheric air. Nitrous oxide is 36.3% available oxygen by mass after it decomposes as compared with atmospheric air at 20.95%. Nitrous oxide also boils at −127.3 °F (−88.5 °C) at atmospheric pressures and offers significant cooling from the latent heat of vaporization, which also aids in increasing the overall air charge density significantly compared to natural aspiration.

== Applications ==
Most automobile petrol engines, as well as many small engines used for non-automotive purposes, are naturally aspirated. Most modern diesel engines powering highway vehicles are turbocharged to produce a more favourable power-to-weight ratio, a higher torque curve, as well as better fuel efficiency and lower exhaust emissions. Turbocharging is nearly universal on diesel engines that are used in railroad, marine engines, and commercial stationary applications (electrical power generation, for example). Forced induction is also used with reciprocating aircraft engines to negate some of the power loss that occurs as the aircraft climbs to higher altitudes.

== Advantages and disadvantages ==
The advantages and disadvantages of a naturally aspirated engine in relation to a same-sized engine relying on forced induction include:

=== Advantages ===
- Easier to maintain and repair
- Lower development and production costs
- Increased reliability, partly due to fewer separate, moving parts
- More direct throttle response than a turbo system due to the lack of turbo lag (an advantage also shared with superchargers)
- Less potential for overheating and or uncontrolled combustion (pinging/ knocking)

=== Disadvantages ===
- Decreased efficiency
- Decreased power-to-weight ratio
- Decreased potential for tuning
- Increased power loss at higher elevation (due to lower air pressure) when compared with forced induction engines

== See also ==
- Carburetor
- Fuel injection
- Manifold vacuum
