= Volkswagen Polo G40 =

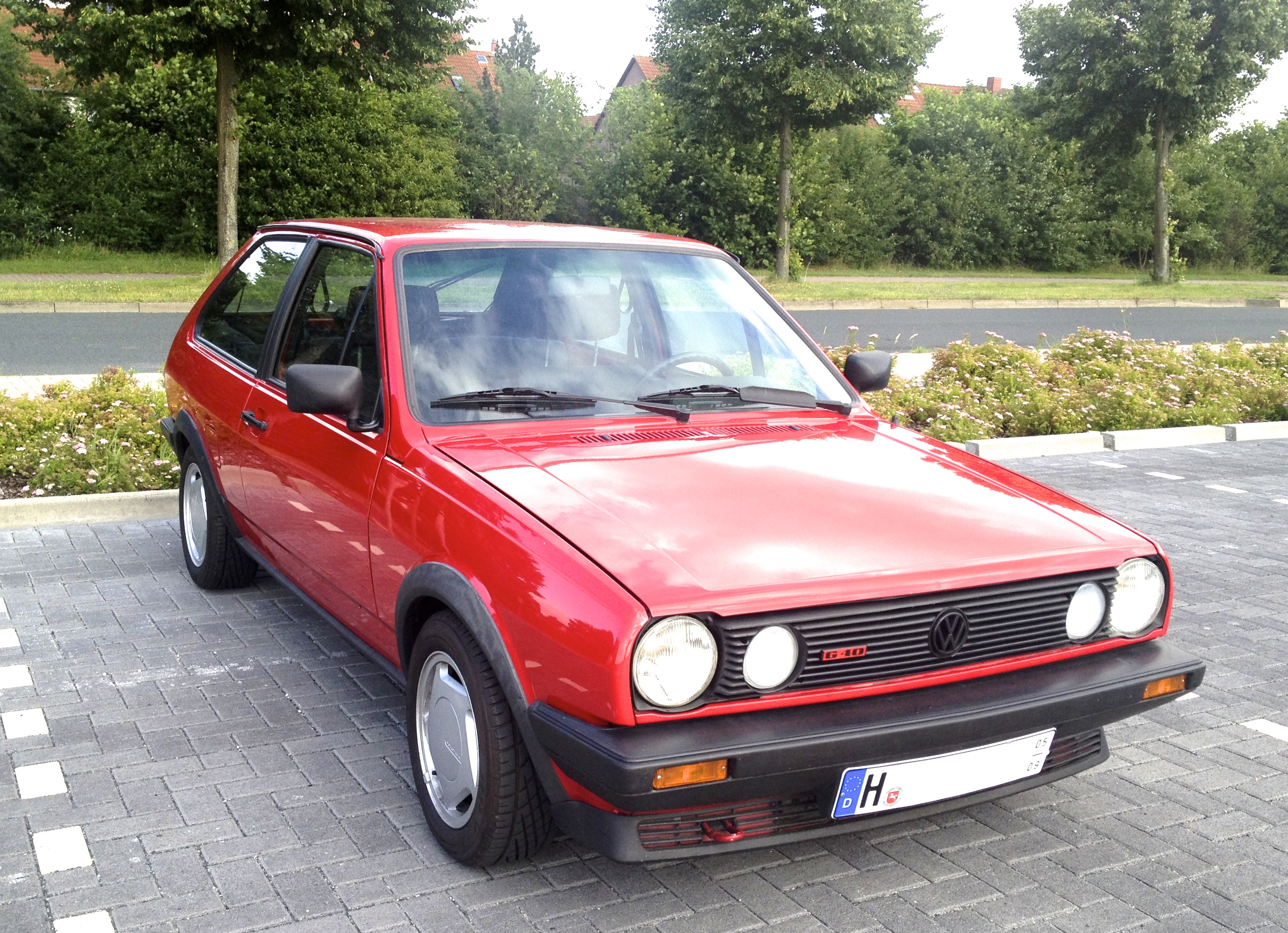

Overview
- Manufacturer: Volkswagen Passenger Cars
- Also called: Polo G40; Polo G-40; Polo G
- Production: 1987 – 1994
- Assembly: Wolfsburg, Germany; Pamplona, Spain

Body and chassis
- Class: supermini
- Body style: 3-door coupé/hatchback
- Layout: Transverse front engine, front-wheel drive
- Platform: Volkswagen Group A02

Powertrain
- Engine: 1.3 L I4 G-Lader supercharger
- Transmission: 5-speed manual

Chronology
- Successor: Polo GTI

The Volkswagen Polo Mk2 and Polo Mk2F were available as supercharged G40 models - called the Volkswagen Polo G40 (sometimes also called Volkswagen Polo GT G40, Volkswagen Polo G-40, or simply Volkswagen Polo G).

== Mk2 ==
At the heart of the Polo GT G40 was its 1.3 litre G40 engine (engine ID code: PY). It displaced 1,272 cubic centimetres (77.6 cu in) from a cylinder bore of 75.0 mm (2.953 in), and a piston stroke of 72.0 mm (2.835 in). The G40s 'G-Lader' supercharger had a displacer width of 40 mm (1.57 in), hence the "G40" name. This G40 engine produced a maximum power output of 85 kW (116 PS; 114 bhp) at 6,000 rpm, and torque of 148 N⋅m (109 lbf⋅ft) at 3,600 rpm.

Stopping power came from uprated front disc brakes, now radially ventilated, sized at 239 mm (9.4 in) in diameter by 20 mm (0.787 in) thick, with ATE single-piston sliding calipers.

Standard roadwheels were 13x5.5 ET38 silver 'Hockenheim' alloy wheels with 175/60 H13 tyres.

Performance figures indicate it could complete the standard discipline of sprinting from a standstill to 100 km/h (62 mph) in 8.1 seconds, and could go on to reach a top speed of 195 km/h (121.2 mph). Three prototype cars had been used by Volkswagen in 1985 to set a number of world endurance speed records, such as the 1.3 litre class records for speed over 24 hours, and speed over a distance of 5,000 km (3,107 mi).

There have been a number of one-make race series for the Polo, starting with the 'Volkswagen Polo G40 Cup' for Mk2 (Germany) and Mk2F G40 (UK) versions. The Polo Cup championship started in 1987 with race-modified Polo G40 producing 82 kW (111 PS; 110 bhp) (with a catalytic converter) and was a support race at rounds of the Deutsche Tourenwagen Meisterschaft.

== Mk2F ==
At the time of launch of the Polo Mk2F, the highest performance model was the Polo GT with 56 kilowatts (76 PS; 75 bhp)(engine ID code: 3F). This featured a multi-point fuel injected version of the 1,272 cc engine, capable of propelling it from 0 - 60 mph (97 km/h) in 11.1 seconds and onto a quoted top speed of 172 km/h (107 mph). Defining features of the Polo GT include red piping in the bumpers, black overhead cloth, a rev counter, wheel arch extensions and a red badge in the grille.

Soon after the launch of the Mk2F, another sporting model was added to the range — a new version of the supercharged G40, now as a full production model in all markets, rather than the limited batch of Mk2 G40s. Engine and gearbox aside, mechanical differences between the G40 and similar looking GT included 20 mm (0.8 in) lower suspension, 239 mm (9.4 in) vented front brake discs and rose-jointed steering and track control arms. The G40 was also marked out by its Le Mans check interior trim, roof-mounted 'bee-sting' aerial and BBS 5.5Jx13 cross-spoke alloy wheels, while the speedometer topped out at 160 mph (compared to 120 mph on the GT).

As with the previous model, Volkswagen Motorsport modified G40 Cup cars were sold for racing in a one-make series, the Volkswagen Polo G40 Cup. A handful of these original racers are still around, and compete in the Super Coupe Cup against other brands.

Sales of the G40 was marred by a comparatively high price tag (£11,568 in the UK - equivalent to around £19,000 in 2010) and because it was based on a nine-year-old design it came with limited luxuries compared to rivals. Power steering, for example, was never an option. With the bigger, better equipped Mk2 Golf GTI 8v not much more expensive it failed to sell in large numbers. Only around 500 right hand drive models were ever made, exclusivity which combined with easy power upgrades has made it popular with enthusiasts.

The model was replaced by the Polo GTI in 1995 in Western Europe, and was not directly replaced in the UK until 2000. However, the Polo Mk4 1.4 16v was the quickest Polo for the next 6 years, followed by the GTI.

== See also ==
- Volkswagen Polo - for an overview of the Polo range
- G60 - for detailed information on the G-Lader engine and subsequent forced induction developments
