= G-Lader =

Volkswagen supercharger

An animation of the operation of a scroll-type supercharger. Air is confined between the two spirals and is compressed as it is forced towards the centre. In automotive application, the spirals would have far fewer turns.

The G-Lader is a scroll-type supercharger used in various Volkswagen Passenger Cars models. Its purpose is to increase the motive power output from the internal combustion engine attainable with a given engine displacement. Since it is not enough to simply inject more fuel, as this produces too rich an air-fuel mixture, more intake air has to be added at the same time. This can be achieved with an exhaust-driven turbocharger, or a crankshaft-driven positive displacement compressor. The G-Lader is in the compressor category, since it is crankshaft-driven and does not have the "lag" usually associated with turbocharged engines.

== History ==
This type of air pump, notable for low noise and high efficiency, was patented on 3 October 1905 by Léon Creux of France (US Patent 801,182). Due to the very imprecise production methods of the period, however, it was not manufacturable for a long time, since the displacer (described below) inside the compressor comes within tenths of a millimetre of the housing wall without making contact. Only with the more advanced engineering methods of the 1980s, did it become possible to produce the G-Lader.

Contrary to expectations, Volkswagen's designs turned out to need relatively frequent repair in normal operation, which was one of the reasons why that manufacturer eventually abandoned this technology at the time. The main cause of its relatively high failure rate was that Volkswagen misrepresented the G-Lader as maintenance-free. Depending on RPMs, load, and design details, various parts wear out, with results ranging from impaired performance, to destruction of the G-Lader. Yet it is frequently possible to extend the life of the G-Lader, sometimes to several hundred thousand kilometres, by periodically overhauling it with suitable replacement parts.

== Operation ==
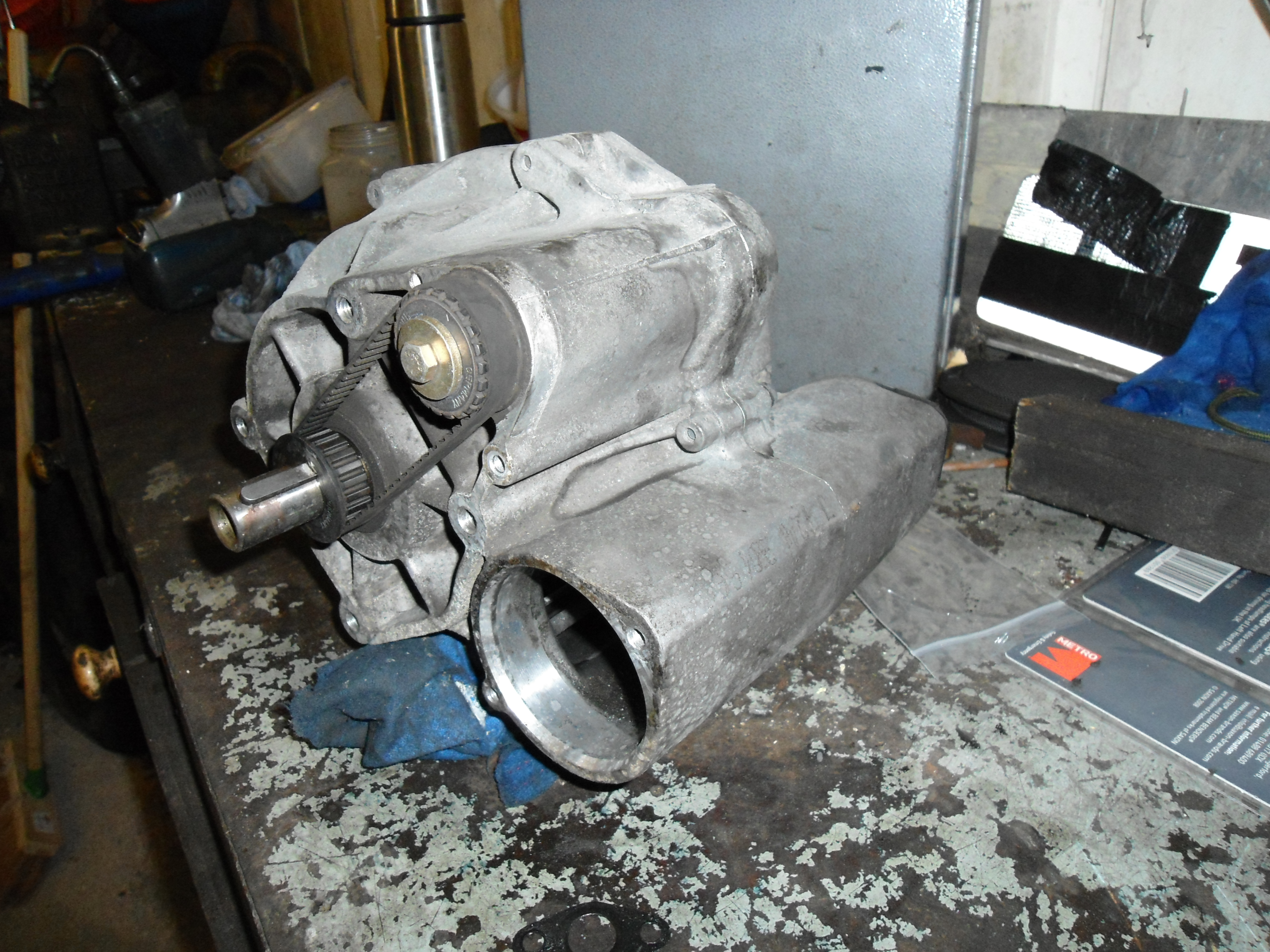
A G-Lader supercharger from a Volkswagen Corrado G60

The supercharger housing holds what is called the displacer plate (or just displacer), on both sides of which are spirals, with seals between the latter and the housing. The housing itself also has spirals on both sides that mesh with those on the displacer. Driven by the crankshaft, which is connected to the displacer shaft by a small belt, the displacer moves eccentrically with respect to the supercharger housing (like the rotor in a Wankel engine) and, through this motion, forces the intake air into a smaller and smaller space, ultimately producing a maximum gauge pressure of 0.8 bars (11.6 psi) with standard delivered pulleys.

== Sizes and car models ==
The German name G-Lader comes from the shape of the supercharger (German: Lader), which looks like the letter G. The displacer's spirals are either 40 millimetres (1.57 in) deep or, in the larger version, 59.5 millimetres (2.34 in) deep, i.e. close to 60 mm. This is the reason we see the engine designations G40 and G60 in the names of Volkswagen models in which it was used:

- Volkswagen Polo Mk2 GT G40 (Typ 86c - Limited to 500 vehicles first series (all black, fog head lamps) and a second of approx 1500, standards colors plus 500 all black for French market only)
- Volkswagen Polo Mk2F GT G40 (Typ 86c)
- Volkswagen Golf Mk2 GTI G60 (Typ 19E)
- Volkswagen Golf Mk2 G60 Rallye (Typ 19E - limited to 5000 vehicles)
- Volkswagen Golf Mk2 G60 Limited (Typ 19E - limited to a special Volkswagen-Motorsport series of 71 vehicles)
- Volkswagen Corrado G60 (Corrado - Typ 53I)
- Volkswagen Passat (B3) G60 Syncro (Passat - Typ 35I)

== See also ==
- G60 - for detailed information on the complete G-Lader engines, and subsequent Volkswagen Group forced induction developments
