= Forced induction =

Concept in engine design

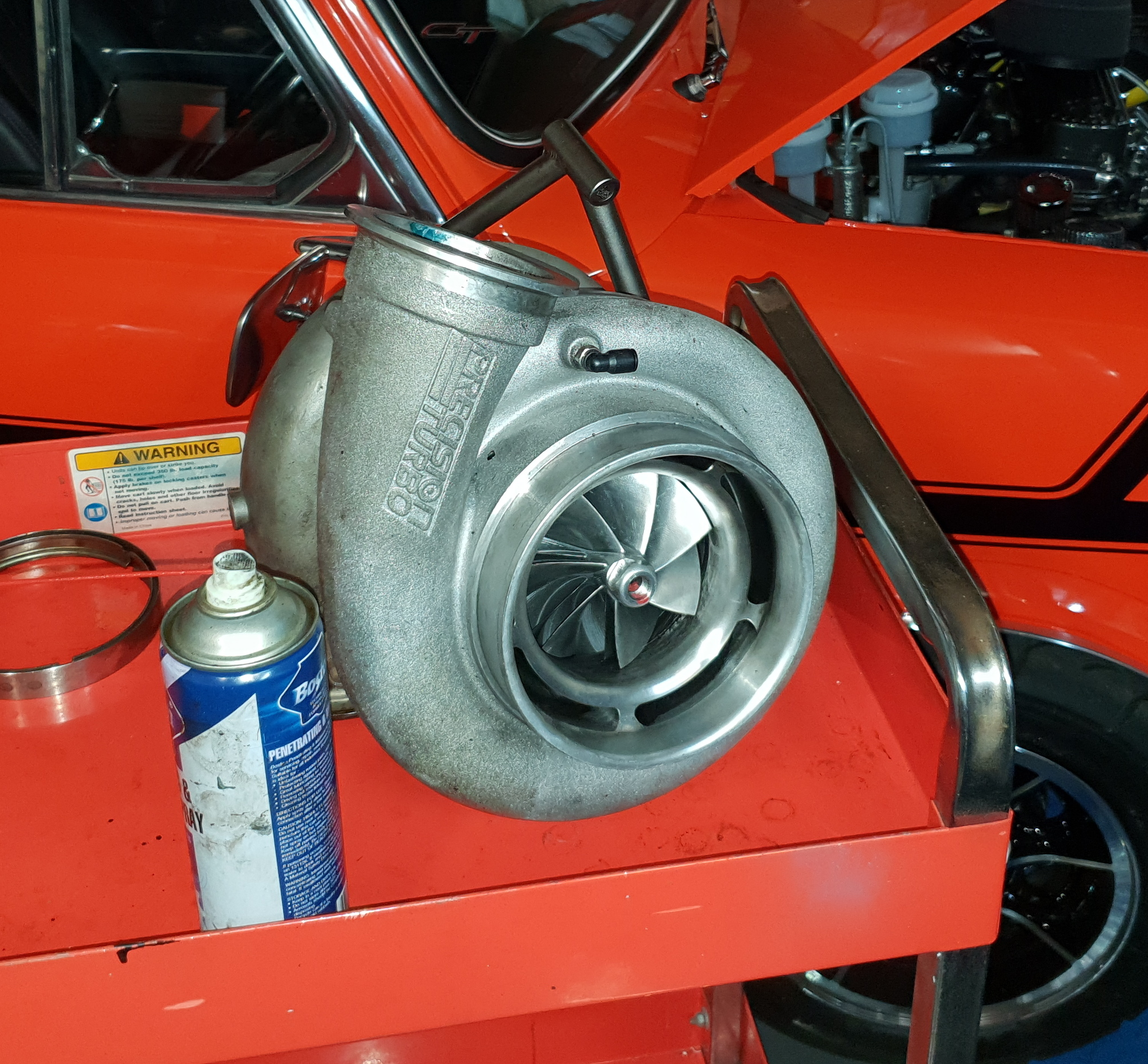
A turbocharger for a car engine

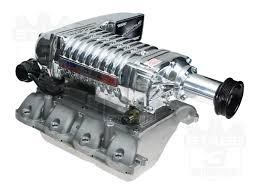
A supercharger (on top of a dark-grey inlet manifold) for a car engine

In an internal combustion engine, forced induction is where turbocharging or supercharging is used to increase the density of the intake air. Engines without forced induction are classified as naturally aspirated.

== Operating principle ==
=== Overview ===
Forced induction is often used to increase the power output of an engine. This is achieved by compressing the intake air, to increase the mass of the air-fuel mixture present within the combustion chamber. A naturally aspirated engine is limited to a maximum intake air pressure equal to its surrounding atmosphere; however a forced induction engine produces "boost", whereby the air pressure is higher than the surrounding atmosphere. Since the density of air increases with pressure, this allows a greater mass of air to enter the combustion chamber.

Theoretically, the vapour power cycle analysis of the second law of thermodynamics would suggest that increasing the mean effective pressure within the combustion chamber would also increase the engine's thermal efficiency. However, considerations (such as cooling the combustion chamber, preventing engine knock and limiting NOx exhaust emissions) can mean that forced induction engines are not always more fuel efficient, particularly in the case of high-performance engines.

=== Diesel engines ===
Four-stroke diesel engines are well suited to forced induction, since the lack of fuel in the intake air means that higher compression ratios can be used without a risk of pre-ignition. Therefore, the use of turbochargers on diesel engines is relatively commonplace.

Two-stroke diesel engines have a significantly different operating principle to two-stroke petrol engines, and require some form of forced induction - generally a supercharger - in order to function.

=== High altitude uses ===
A reduced density of intake air is caused by the loss of atmospheric density seen with elevated altitudes. Therefore, an early use of forced induction was in aircraft engines. At 18,000 feet (5,500 m), the air is at half the pressure of sea level, which means that an engine without forced induction would produce less than half the power at this altitude. Forced induction is used to artificially increase the density of the intake air, in order to reduce the loss of power at higher altitudes.

Systems that use a turbocharger to maintain an engine's sea-level power output are called "turbo-normalized" systems. Generally, a turbo-normalized system attempts to maintain a manifold pressure of 29.5 inHg (100 kPa).

== Types of compressors ==
The most commonly used forced-induction devices are turbochargers and superchargers. A turbocharger drives its compressor using a turbine powered by the flow of exhaust gases, whereas a supercharger is mechanically powered by the engine (usually using a belt from the engine's crankshaft).

== Associated technologies ==
Intercooling is often used to reduce the temperature of the intake air after it is compressed. Another less commonly used method is water injection (or methanol injection).
