= Volkswagen Corrado =

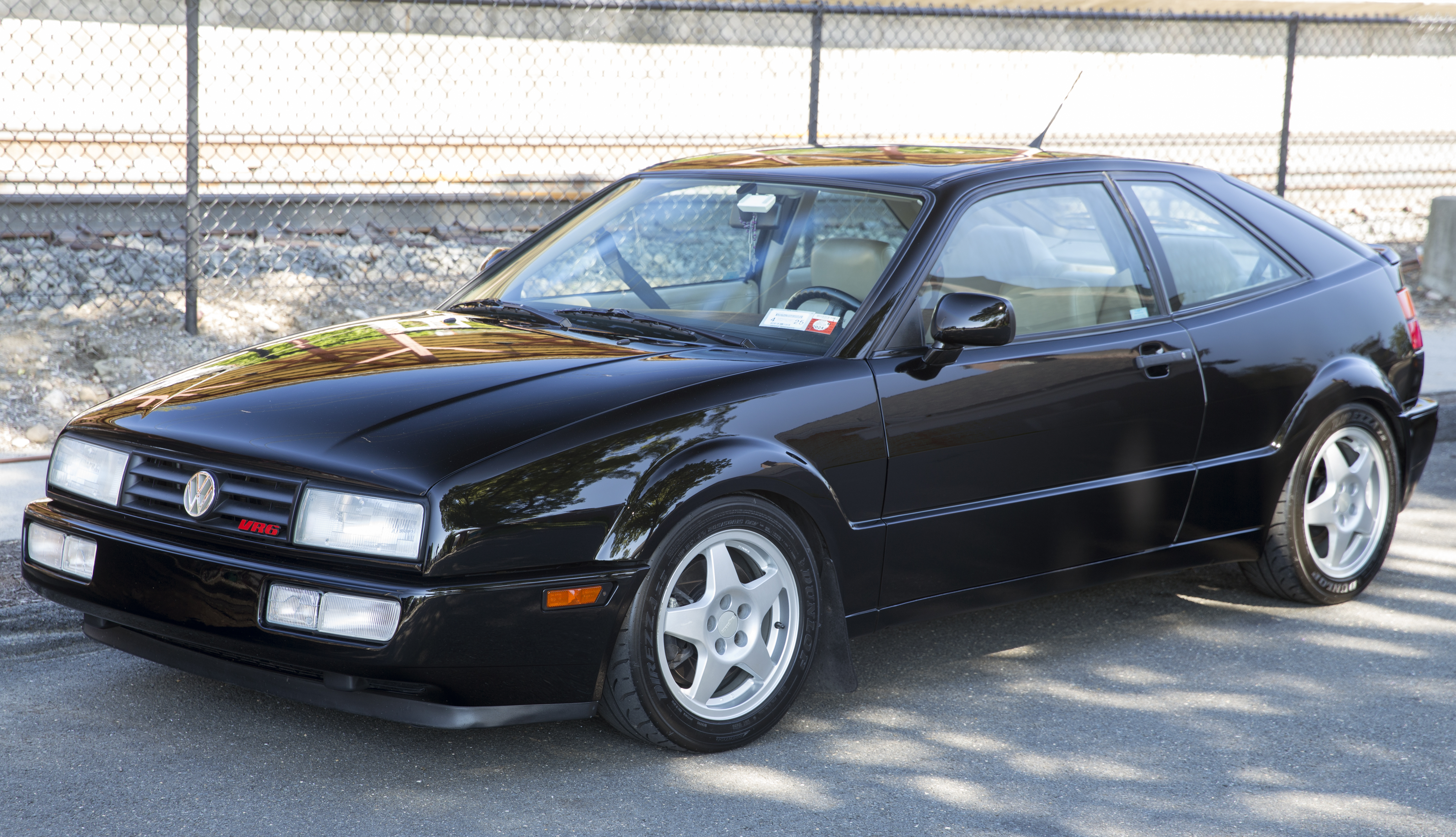

Overview
- Manufacturer: Volkswagen
- Production: 1988–1995
- Assembly: Germany: Osnabrück (Karmann)
- Designer: Herbert Schäfer

Body and chassis
- Class: Sport compact
- Body style: 3-door 2+2 coupé
- Layout: Front-engine, front-wheel-drive
- Platform: Volkswagen Group A2 platform and Volkswagen Group B3 platform
- Related: Volkswagen Golf Mk2; Volkswagen Jetta Mk2; SEAT Toledo Mk1

Powertrain
- Engine: petrol: 1.8 L I4; 1.8 L supercharged I4; 2.0 L I4; 2.8 L VR6; 2.9 L VR6
- Transmission: 5-speed manual 4-speed automatic

Dimensions
- Wheelbase: 1989–1992: 2,471 mm (97.3 in); 1993–1995: 2,469 mm (97.2 in)
- Length: 4,049 mm (159.4 in)
- Width: 1989–1992: 1,674 mm (65.9 in); 1993–1995: 1,689 mm (66.5 in)
- Height: 1,310 mm (51.57 in)
- Curb weight: 1,210–1,274 kg (2,668–2,809 lb)

Chronology
- Predecessor: Volkswagen Scirocco Mk.2
- Successor: Volkswagen Scirocco Mk.3

The Volkswagen Corrado is a sport compact car which was marketed by Volkswagen from 1988 until 1995. It was manufactured by Karmann in Osnabrück, Germany. The Corrado is a three-door coupé with two side passenger doors and a rear liftback that seats four passengers in a 2+2 seating arrangement. It has a front-engine, front-wheel-drive layout and was based on the Volkswagen Group A2 platform used in the Volkswagen Golf Mk2.

Designed by Herbert Schäfer, the Corrado overlapped and eventually superseded Volkswagen's Scirocco model. 97,521 Corrados were manufactured over the seven year production run; about 50,000 of them were sold in the United States.

== Overview ==
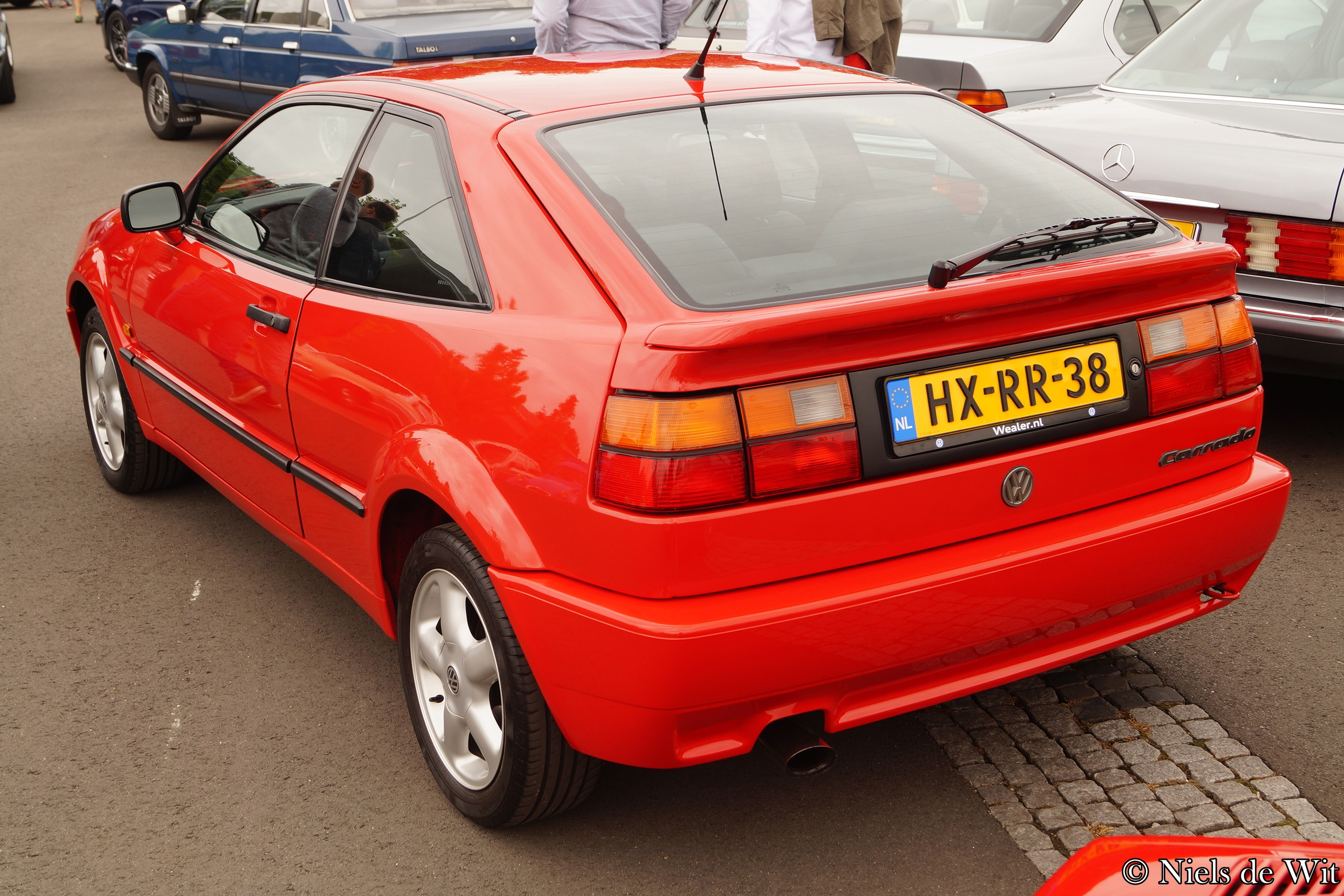
Corrado, rear view

The Corrado is a three-door hatchback/liftback with a 2+2 seating layout. The Corrado's floorpan is based on the A2 platform (i.e. Mark 2 Golf/Jetta) and, with the exception of VR6 models, all versions use the subframes, suspension, steering and braking components from the Volkswagen A2 platform model range. The body shell was built by Karmann and was partially zinc plated and galvanized, providing strong rust protection.

The VR6 uses suspension components from the A3 model range, including the rear axle assembly and some parts of the A3's 'plus' type front axle assembly. The subsequent wider front wheel track of the Corrado VR6 necessitated the fitting of new front wings with wider wheel arches and liners along with a new front bumper assembly. Together with a new raised-style bonnet to accommodate the VR6 engine, these body improvements were carried across the model range.

The Corrado is noted for its flush mounted windows and active rear spoiler – which raises automatically when the car exceeds 100 km/h (62 mph) (45 mph or 72 km/h in the North American market), automatically retracts at speeds below 25 km/h (15 mph) or can be manually controlled by the driver.

The name Corrado was derived from the Spanish verb "correr", meaning to run or sprint. Prototypes were named Taifun (German for "Typhoon") but the name was changed prior to release.

== Variants ==
Launched in the end of 1988 (three years before the end of Scirocco production), all Corrados were front-wheel drive and featured petrol engines. The Corrado debuted with two engine choices: a 1.8 litre 16-valve inline-four with 136 PS (100 kW; 134 hp) (KR), and a supercharged 1.8 litre eight valve inline four, marketed as the G60 and delivering 160 PS (118 kW; 158 hp).

The Corrado G60 is named for the G Lader with which it is equipped, a scroll-type supercharger whose interior resembles the letter "G". Sales were initially slow, as the Corrado was considerably more expensive than the Scirocco it was meant to replace. Volkswagen United States stated that they had "overequipped the Corrado" when first introduced, leading to sluggish sales.

There were also two special models of the G60. The G60 Jet was an economy version for the German market only, thought to be a run out model before the introduction of the VR6. This model was only available in four colours and featured a colour coded interior. Volkswagen could not confirm production numbers for the Jet model.

Another variant is Volkswagen Motorsport (VWMS) Corrado 16V G60. Although the 16-valve engine combined with the original G-Lader was appreciated within the enthusiast community, the model never saw series production. It is generally believed that only two factory built examples were manufactured, both in Nugget Yellow.

Volkswagen introduced two new engines for 1992. The first was a naturally aspirated 2.0 litre, 16-valve 136 PS (100 kW; 134 hp) inline-four, basically a further development of the 1.8-litre engine; this engine was never made available to the North American market.

The second was the 12-valve VR6 engine, which came in two variants: a 2.8-litre 178 hp (133 kW; 180 PS) model for the United States and Canadian markets, and a 2,861 cc (2.9 L; 174.6 cu in) producing 190 PS (187 bhp; 140 kW) at 5,800 rpm and 245 N⋅m (181 lbf⋅ft) at 4,200 rpm of torque version for the European market, fuel feed by Bosch Motronic 2.7 fuel injection. In the United States, the VR6 model was announced in October 1991 but only arrived during the 1992 calendar year and was marketed as the Corrado SLC (Sport Luxury Coupe). 3,500 examples were brought in for 1992; 1,500 leftover G60s were also sold after the SLC had been introduced.

Upon revising the engine, Volkswagen updated the styling with a new front grille and foglamps. With the introduction of the VR6 engine, the G60 engine disappeared from the North American market after 1992 and European market in 1993. The VR6 engine provided a compromise between both V-shaped and straight engines by placing the two cylinder banks at an angle of 15°, with a single cylinder head.

This design allowed engineers to fit a six cylinder engine into roughly the space previously occupied by four cylinder engines, while closely approaching the smoothness of a straight six design. 1994 was the last model year of the Corrado in the United States.

A lower cost, 2.0-litre 8-valve model with 115 PS (85 kW; 113 hp) was produced for Europe from 1993 until 1995. A limited edition only for the United Kingdom, the Corrado Storm, was also sold. Some discreet "Storm" badging, a colour keyed front grille, an additional Storm badge on the gear gaiter surround (an upgrade from the standard Karmann badge), 15-inch BBS "Solitude" alloy wheels, and standard fitment of some previously optional items (such as the leather heated front seats) differentiated this model from the base Corrado VR6.

Only five hundred were produced: 250 in Classic Green with a cream leather interior, and 250 in Mystic Blue, a colour unique to the Storm, with a black leather interior.

An extremely rare special edition based on the VR6, named the Corrado Campaign was launched and produced in 1992. Only six cars were produced with just four cars surviving as of 2022. The Campaign model was unique with Dusty Mauve Pearl Effect paint and a red brick leather interior. They were built as a prize as part of a dealer incentive to sell the most Karmann-produced vehicles and all six cars were given to the top six dealerships in the United Kingdom as a bonus.

The Corrado was offered in Japan at Yanase dealerships that specialize in North American and European vehicles, offering the 1.8 L engine with either the automatic or manual transmission. The larger VR6 would have been considerably more expensive to tax, as the engine was over two liters' displacement.

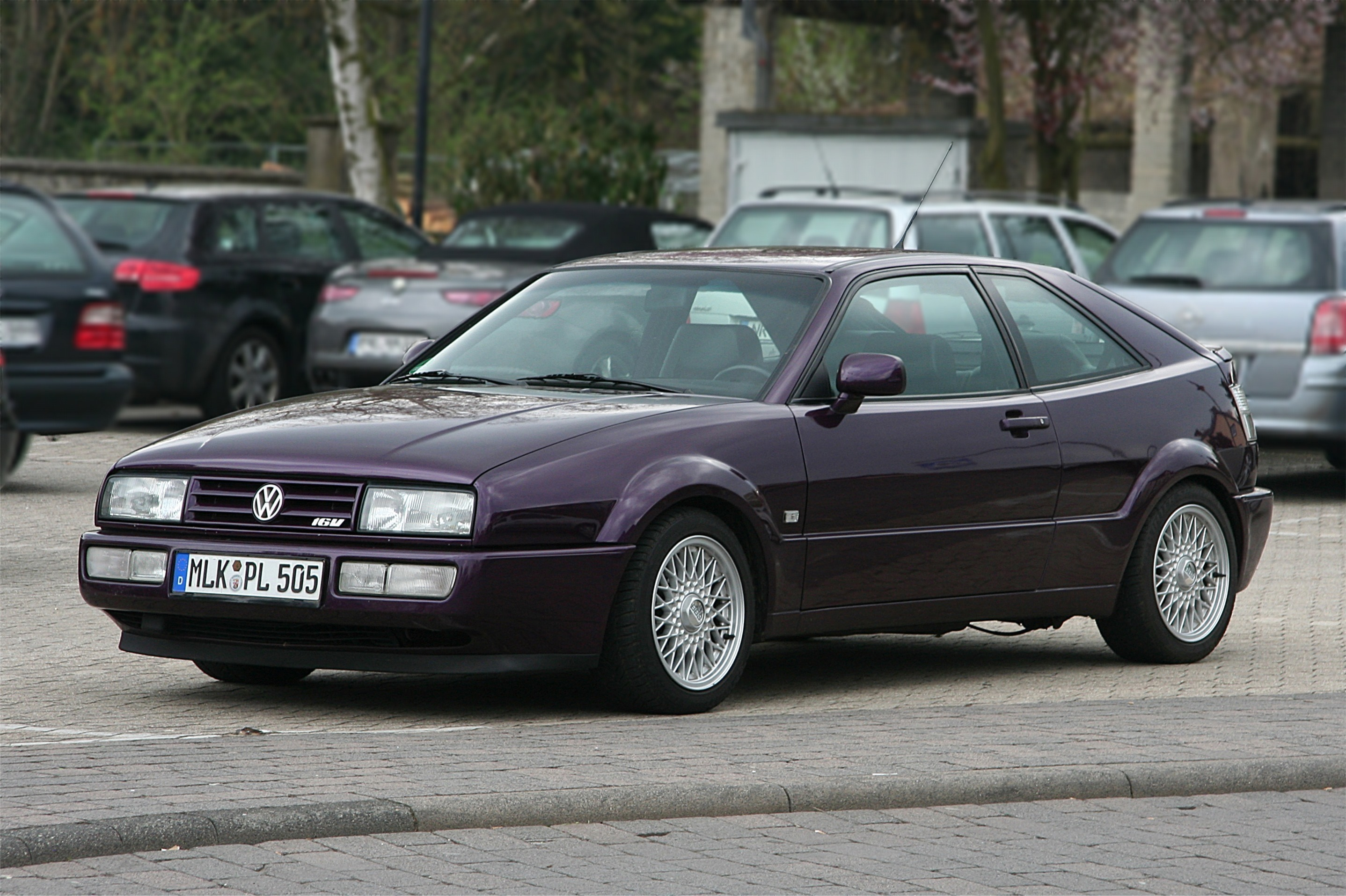
Volkswagen Corrado 16V (Europe)

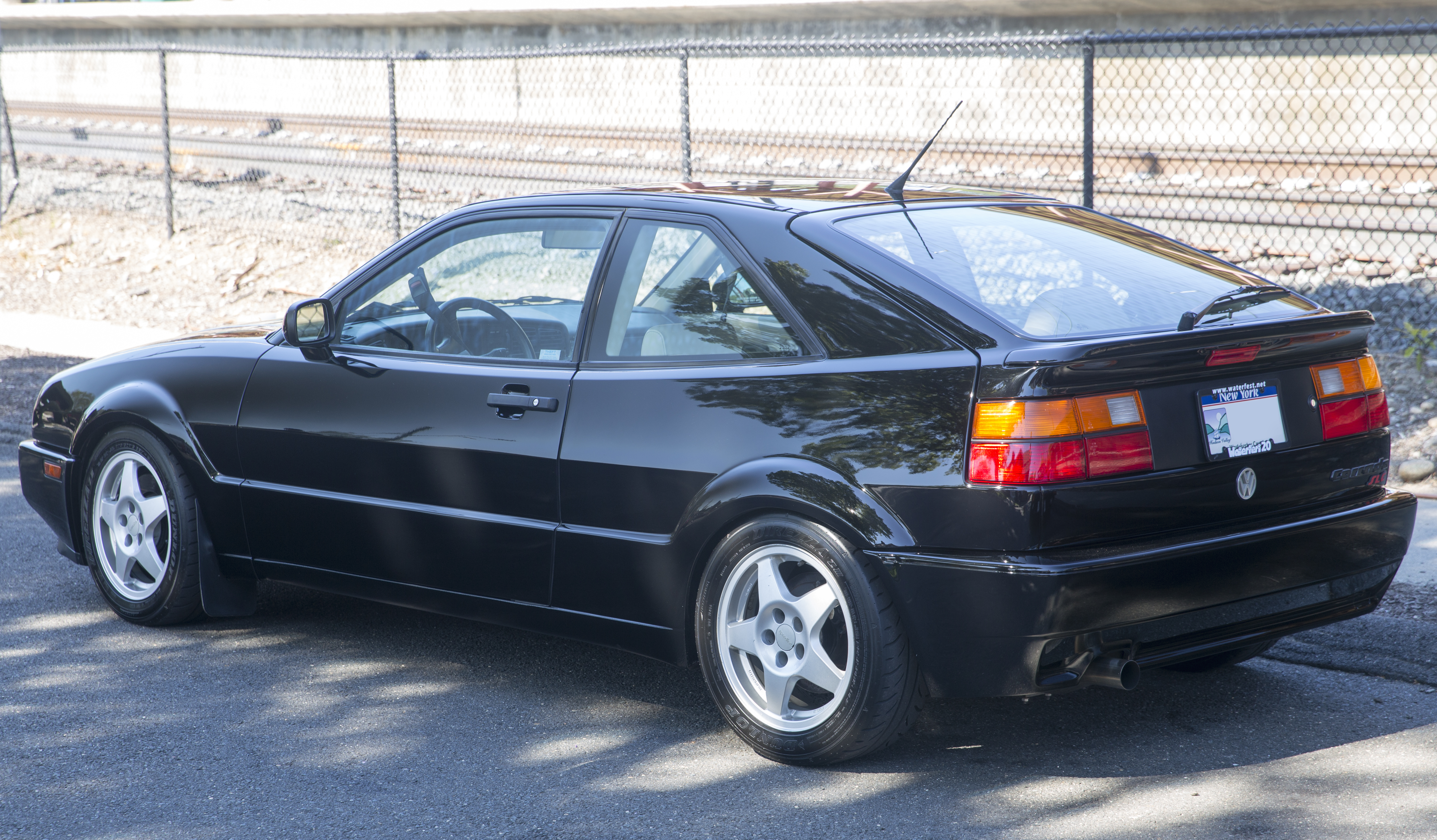
1993 Volkswagen Corrado SLC (US VR6; rear view)

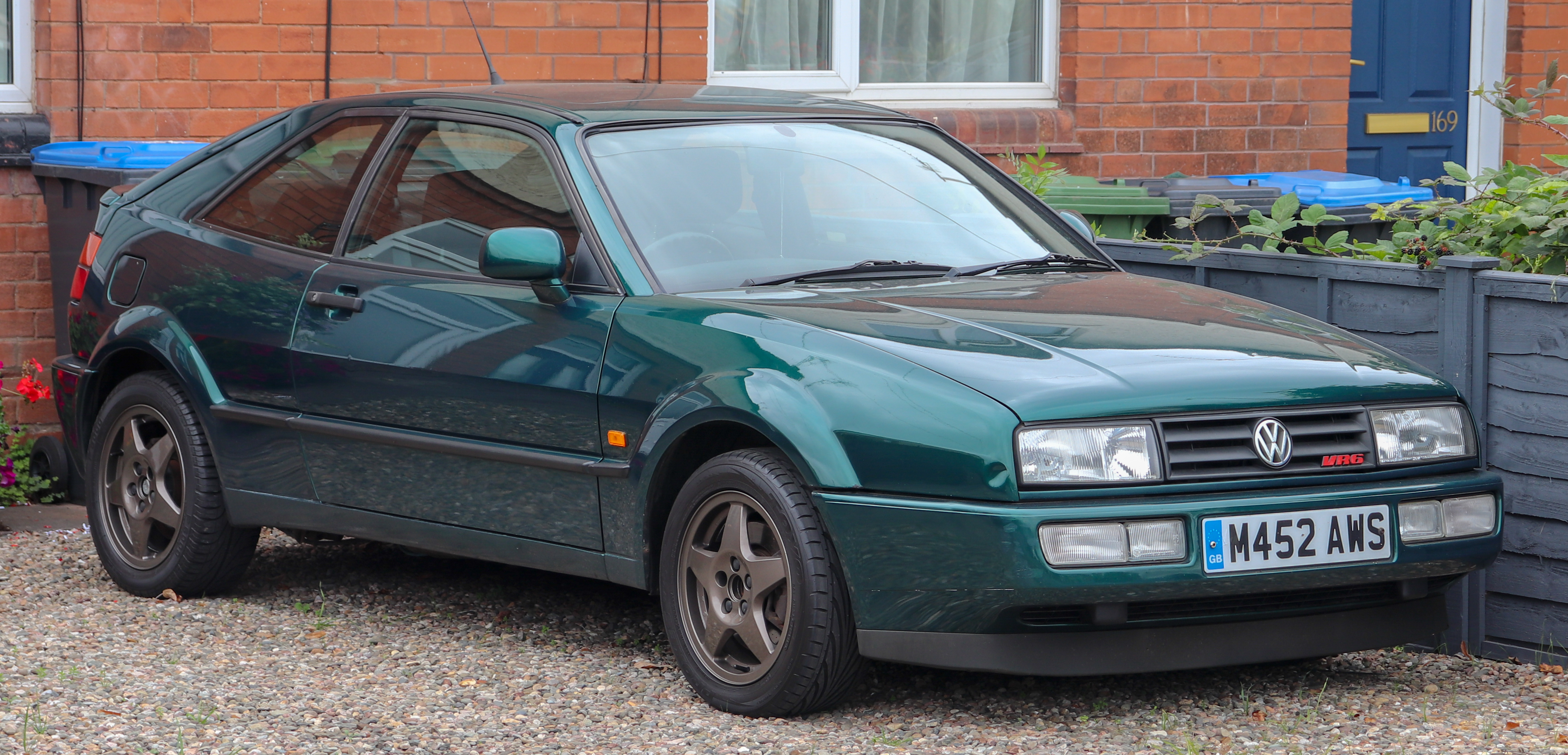
1994 Volkswagen Corrado VR6 (Europe)

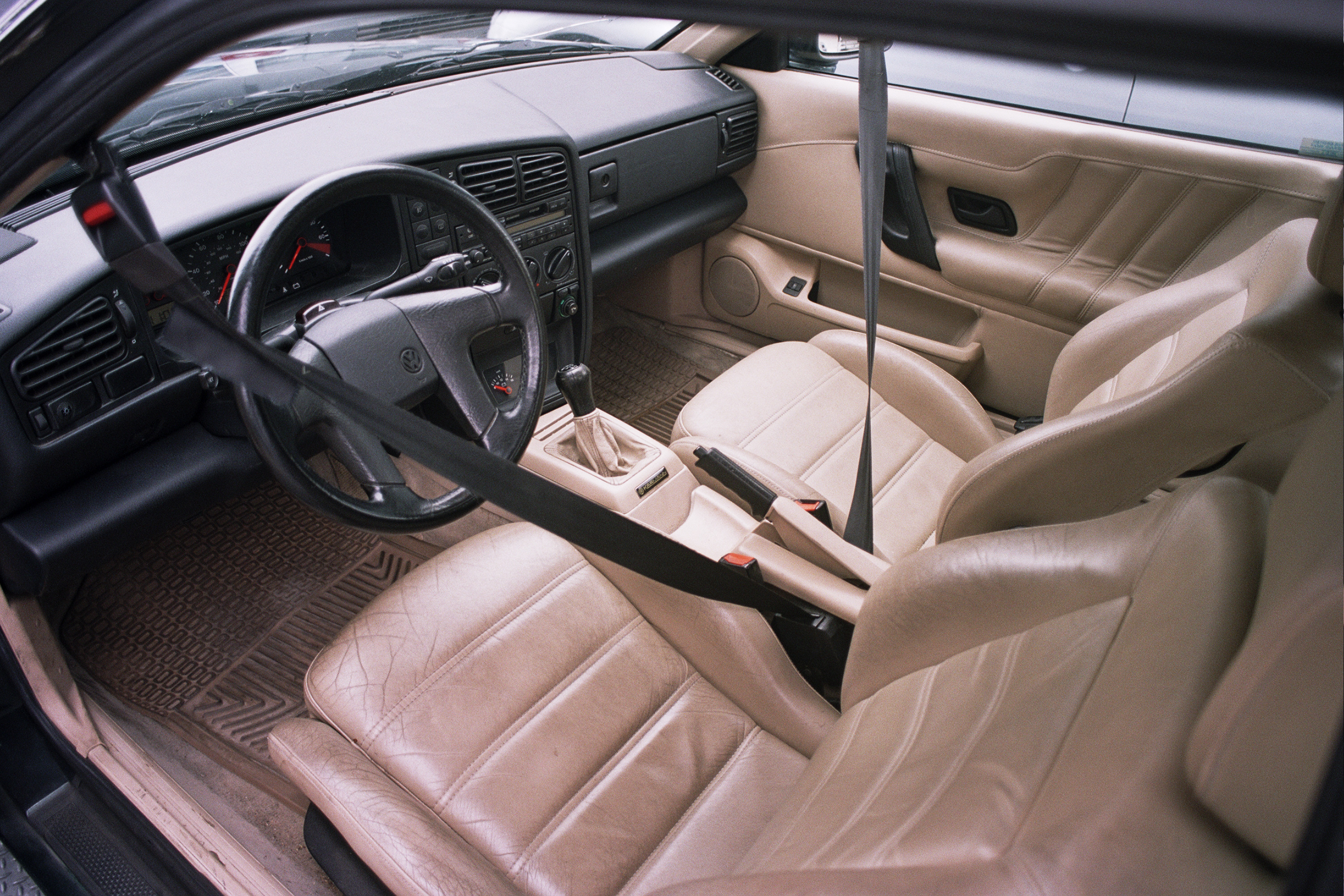
Volkswagen Corrado VR6 interior

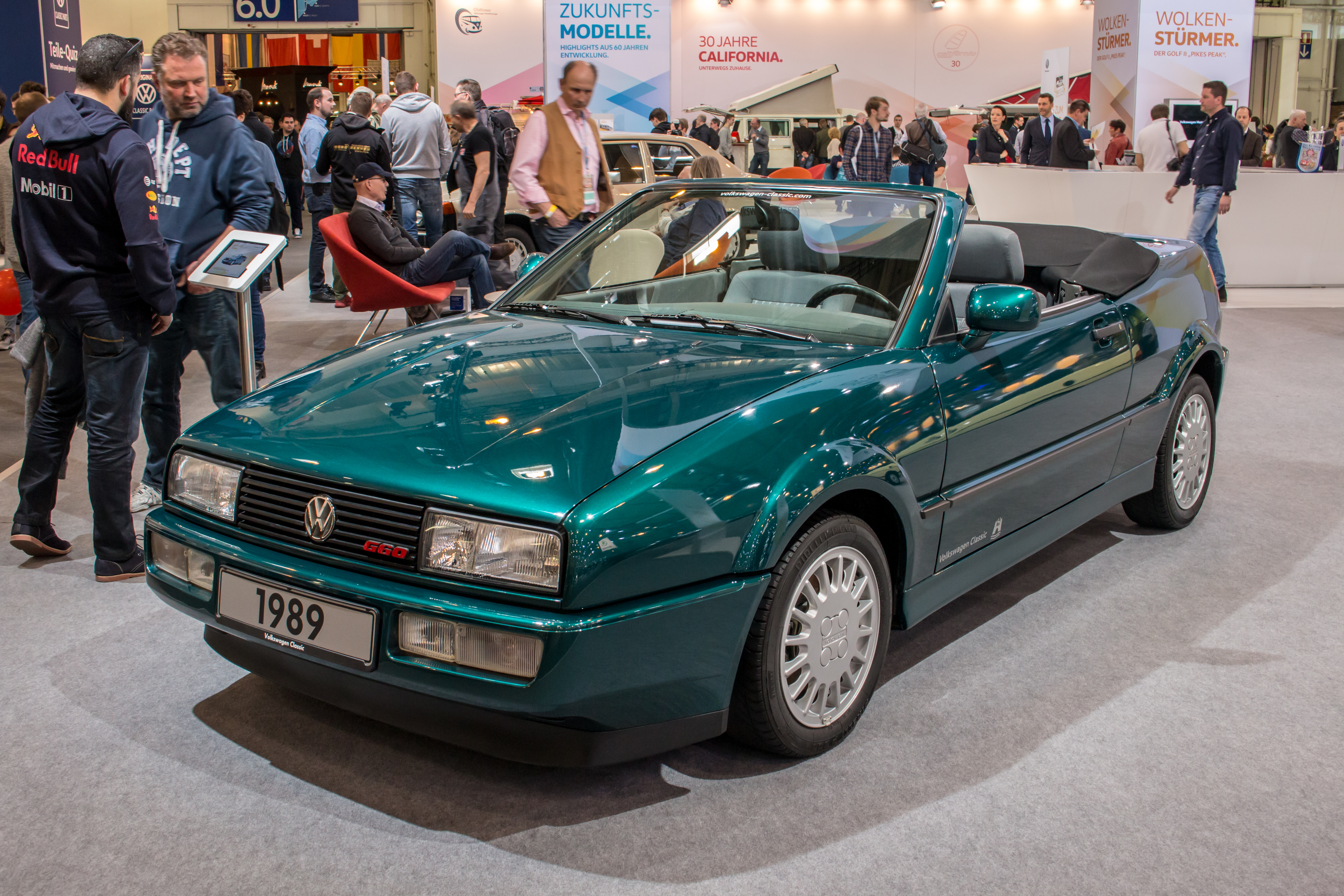
The 1993 Volkswagen Corrado Cabriolet concept

=== Specifications ===
Model	Years	Displacement	Peak power	Peak torque	Top speed	Acceleration 0–100 km/h (0-62 mph)	Notes
1.8 (8V)		1,781 cc (108.7 cu in)	79 kW (107 PS; 106 hp) at 5400 rpm	154 N⋅m (114 lb⋅ft) at 3800 rpm			Select export markets
1.8 (8V)		1,781 cc (108.7 cu in)	82 kW (112 PS; 110 hp) at 5400 rpm	159 N⋅m (117 lb⋅ft) at 4000 rpm			Select export markets
1.8 16V	1989–1992	1,781 cc (108.7 cu in)	100 kW (136 PS; 134 hp) at 6300 rpm	162 N⋅m (119 lb⋅ft) at 4800 rpm	210 km/h (130 mph)	9.1 s	
1.8 8V G60	1989–1993	1,781 cc (108.7 cu in)	118 kW (160 PS; 158 hp) at 5600 rpm	225 N⋅m (166 lb⋅ft) at 4000 rpm	225 km/h (140 mph) (manual); 217 km/h (135 mph) (automatic)	8.5 s (manual) (Note: 0–60 mph (97 km/h): 7.5 s (North America)); 7.7 s (automatic) (Note: 0–60 mph (97 km/h))	North America only
2.0 (8V)	1993–1995	1,984 cc (121.1 cu in)	85 kW (115 PS; 113 hp) at 5400 rpm	166 N⋅m (122 lb⋅ft) at 3200 rpm	200 km/h (124 mph) (manual); 196 km/h (122 mph) (auto)	10.6 s (manual); 11.5 s (automatic)	
2.0 16V	1992–1995	1,984 cc (121.1 cu in)	100 kW (136 PS; 134 hp) at 5800 rpm	180 N⋅m (133 lb⋅ft) at 4400 rpm	210 km/h (130 mph) (manual); 208 km/h (129 mph) (automatic)	9.3 s (manual); 9.9 s (automatic)	
2.8 12V VR6	1992–1995	2,792 cc (170.4 cu in)	130 kW (176 PS; 174 hp) at 5800 rpm	240 N⋅m (177 lb⋅ft) at 4200 rpm	230 km/h (143 mph)	7.2 s	Select export markets
2.8 12V VR6	1992–1995	2,792 cc (170.4 cu in)	133 kW (180 PS; 178 hp) at 5800 rpm	240 N⋅m (177 lb⋅ft) at 4200 rpm	225 km/h (140 mph)	6.8 s (manual); 7.8 s (automatic)	North America, "Corrado SLC"
2.9 12V VR6	1991–1995	2,861 cc (174.6 cu in)	140 kW (190 PS; 187 hp) at 5800 rpm	245 N⋅m (181 lb⋅ft) at 4200 rpm	233 km/h (145 mph) (manual); 230 km/h (143 mph) (auto)	6.9 s (manual); 7.9 s (automatic)	

== Reviews ==
Auto Express magazine describe it as "Regarded as one of VW’s best ever drivers’ cars". The VR6 model was listed as one of the "25 Cars You Must Drive Before You Die" by the British magazine Car, and 'By far the most desirable version of the Corrado' by Auto Express.

In MSN Autos 'Cool Cars We Miss' feature they listed the Corrado among the top eight "Gone but not forgotten: a short list of cars once loved, still missed", describing it in the following manner: "The VW Corrado VR6 is coveted because of its seductive styling, road handling capabilities and its role as trailblazer, introducing the VR6 to the American market."

In 1988, in the first incarnation of the BBC television show Top Gear, racing car driver and presenter Tiff Needell reviewed the Corrado in G60 form, giving it a positive review and stating that "Handling wise, the Corrado is classic front wheel drive, and it's really very, very good indeed." In November 2003, in Series 3 of the relaunched Top Gear, Richard Hammond identified the Corrado as a future classic, "a kind of classic waiting in the wings... I think it's really rather special... the result is fantastic," but countered with the comment that it "was too expensive, and nobody bought it."

== Sales ==
Year	Production
1988	3,206
1989	24,389
1990	21,893
1991	17,058
1992	16,085
1993	8,623
1994	3,787
1995	2,424
Total	97,521
