= Volkswagen Polo =

Model series by Volkswagen

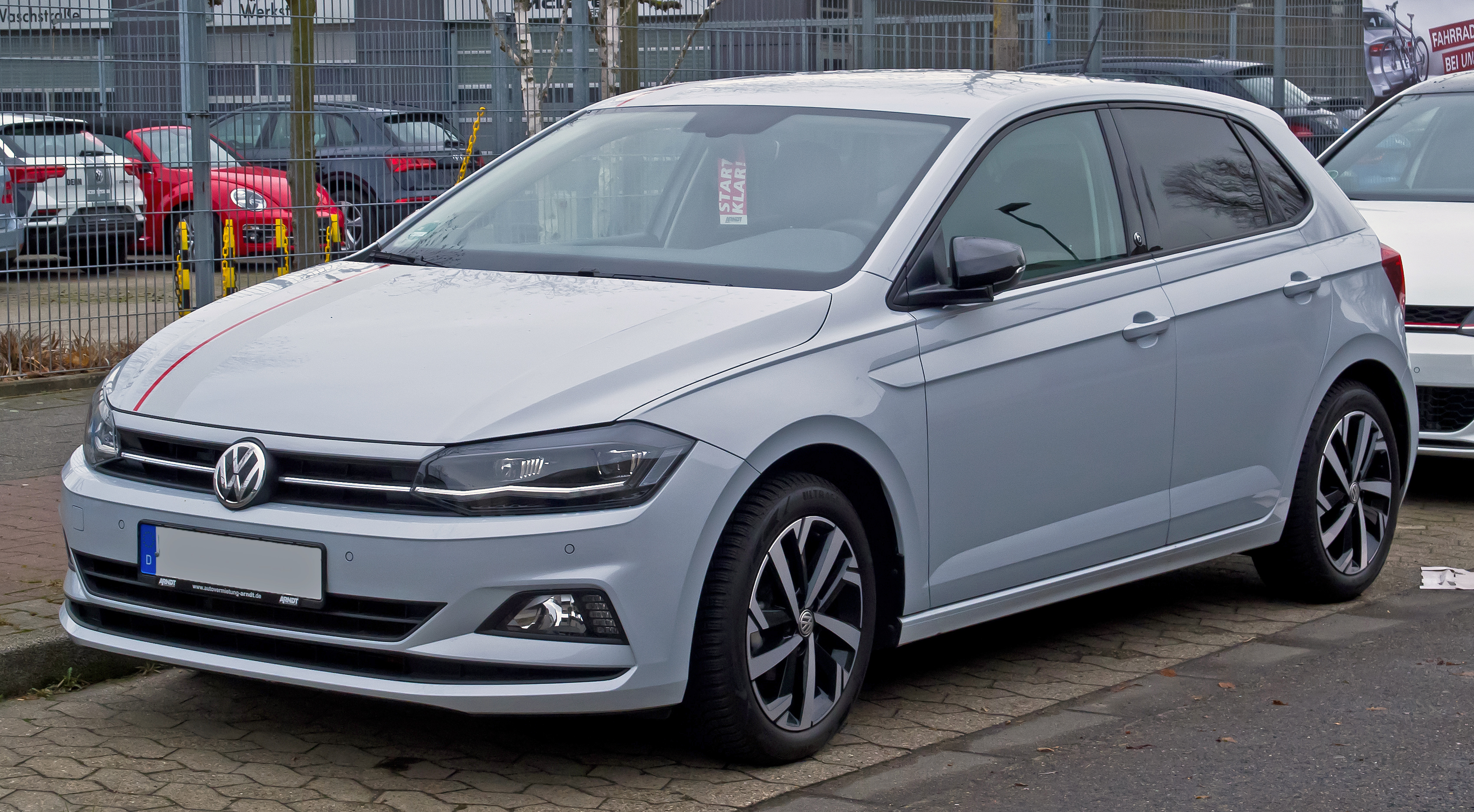

Overview
- Manufacturer: Volkswagen
- Production: 1975–present

Body and chassis
- Class: Supermini/subcompact car (B)
- Layout: Front-engine, front-wheel-drive

The Volkswagen Polo is a supermini car (B-segment) produced by the German car manufacturer Volkswagen since 1975. It is sold in Europe and other markets worldwide in hatchback, saloon, and estate variants throughout its production run. As of 2018, six separate generations of the Polo had been produced, usually identified by a "Series" or "Mark" number.

Some generations were facelifted midway through production, with the updated versions known unofficially by an addition of the letter F to the mark number, e.g., Mk2F. Some members of the automotive press and some enthusiasts consider the facelifts to be separate models, so have used the unofficial designations Polo Mk1 to Mk7 for previous generations. Each Polo model is also identified by a two- or three-character Volkswagen Group Typ number. Official VW Polo history describes Mark I to Mark IV using either Roman numerals or Arabic numerals, with facelifted variants known as "Phase II" models. The body style has been varied through the life of the car, originally as a hatchback, which derived from the Audi 50. A saloon version was marketed as the Volkswagen Derby.

Volkswagen vehicles built on different platforms have carried the Polo nameplate. For example, the Volkswagen Polo Playa hatchback sold in Southern Africa in the late 1990s was a rebadged SEAT Ibiza, which has a different body shell from the Polo Mk3 sold in Europe at the same time. Starting in 1982, Volkswagen sold the Polo in Japan initially through an agreement with Japanese dealership Yanase that specializes in European and North American vehicles. Of all Volkswagens imported into Japan, only the Polo (until 2017) and the Golf (until 1997) complied with Japanese government dimension regulations until the introduction of the VW Up! in 2012.

== Related models ==
The first Polo was a rebadged version of the Audi 50 hatchback launched in August 1974. The Audi 50 was discontinued in 1978, as Audi concentrated on larger luxury models. The Mk1 and Mk2 versions of the Polo were then standalone models in the Volkswagen range.

With the expansion of the Volkswagen Group: Audi (in the 1960s), SEAT (in the 1980s), and Škoda (in the 1990s) were acquired, and the platform used for the Polo was shared with other models.

The Polo shared its platform with the SEAT Ibiza Mk2. The Ibiza was actually launched before the Polo Mk3 and shared essentially all its mechanicals, the dashboard, and other interior components, although no body panels were shared between the two cars. The saloon and estate versions of the Polo Mk3 were actually rebadged SEAT Córdoba models and had no body panels in common with the Polo hatchback. The SEAT Inca and Volkswagen Caddy vans were also based on this model. The Volkswagen Lupo and SEAT Arosa were also based on a shortened version of the Polo Mk3 platform.

The Polo Mk4 continued this trend of platform sharing, with the SEAT Ibiza Mk3 and Škoda Fabia Mk1 and Mk2 both being developed on the same platform and featuring several of the same engines.

The 2009 Polo Mk5 is developed on the latest platform, known as the PQ25, the same platform used in the SEAT Ibiza Mk4 that was launched in 2008 and the Audi A1.

== Body styles ==
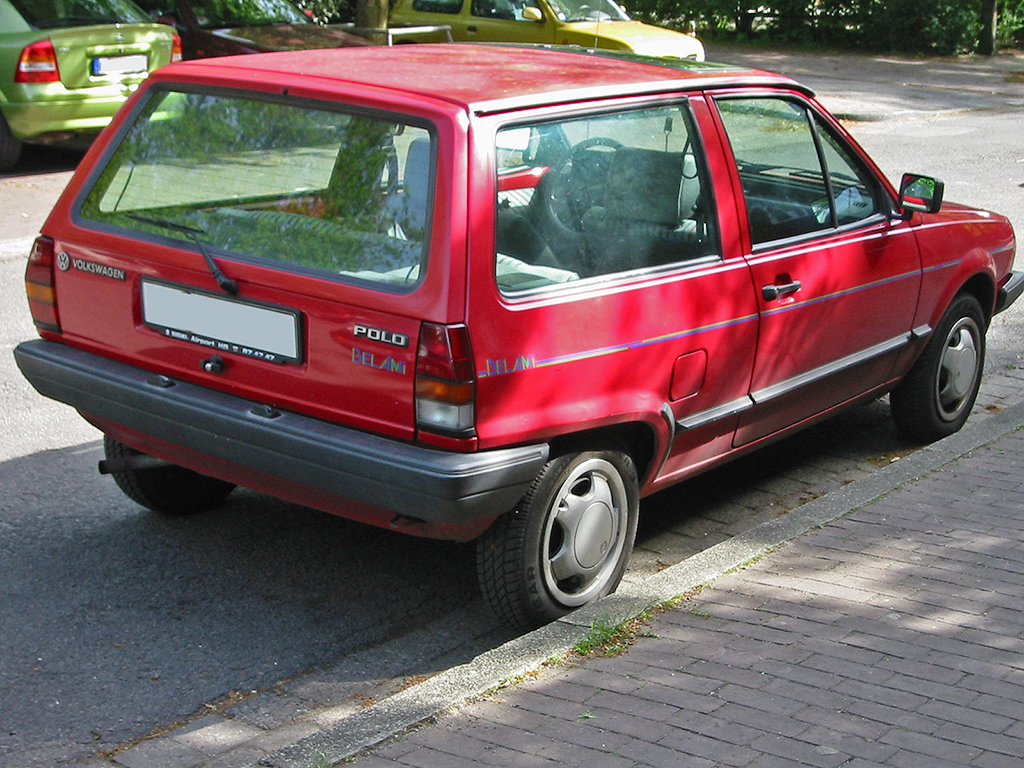
Mark II Polo "Wagon" shape

The first Polos were hatchbacks, with the saloon being marketed as the Volkswagen Derby.

With the release of the Polo Mk2, the saloon was renamed the Volkswagen Polo Classic' and the "conventional"-styled hatchback (with a sloping tailgate) was renamed as a coupé, the Volkswagen Polo Coupé. Unusually, the third (and new) body that was actually marketed as the Volkswagen Polo Hatchback was closer in concept to a small estate, albeit with exactly the same wheelbase and floor pan as the coupé instead of the (longer) saloon. This latter version, also known as the squareback (in the original German brochures, "steilheck", literally "steep tail"), amongst other nicknames, was the most popular in virtually every country where the Polo was sold. Despite the differences in silhouette and target market segment, all body types were two- or three-door only.

From the Polo Mk3 onwards, the range was more straightforwardly conventional, including unambiguous "saloon", "hatchback", and "estate" models, with only the hatchback offering both five-door and slightly shorter three-door models (both still with quite vertical tailgates, the coupé variation having been retired), the others being four or five-door only and increasing in length from hatch to saloon to estate.

=== Summary ===
- Three-door hatchback (Mk1 to Mk5) – the Mk2 and Mk2F were available in two separate three-door hatchback styles, one of which was badged as a coupé.
- Two-door saloon (Mk1, Mk1F, Mk2, Mk2F)
- Four-door saloon (Mk3, Mk3F, Mk4, Mk4F, Mk5, Mk6)
- Five-door hatchback (Mk3, Mk3F, Mk4, Mk4F, Mk5, Mk6)
- Five-door estate (Mk3, Mk3F)
- Five-door crossover SUV-style (two-wheel drive) hatchback (Mk4, Mk4F, Mk5)

== Mechanical layout ==
The Polo is a compact car, with a traditional transversely mounted engine and front-wheel drive. Mk1 Polos only came with four-cylinder petrol engines, but for the Mk2, a diesel engine was offered for the first time, although only in certain markets, others having to wait until the launch of the Mk3. The current range includes a variety of three- and four-cylinder petrol and diesel engines.

Early versions used a four-speed manual transmission, whilst the current car is available with either six-speed manual or seven-speed automatic transmission. The suspension system on all models uses a fully independent MacPherson strut front suspension, and a twist-beam rear suspension. Most models use disc brakes at the front and rear drum brakes, although some recent models have all-round disc brakes.

== First generation (86; 1975) ==
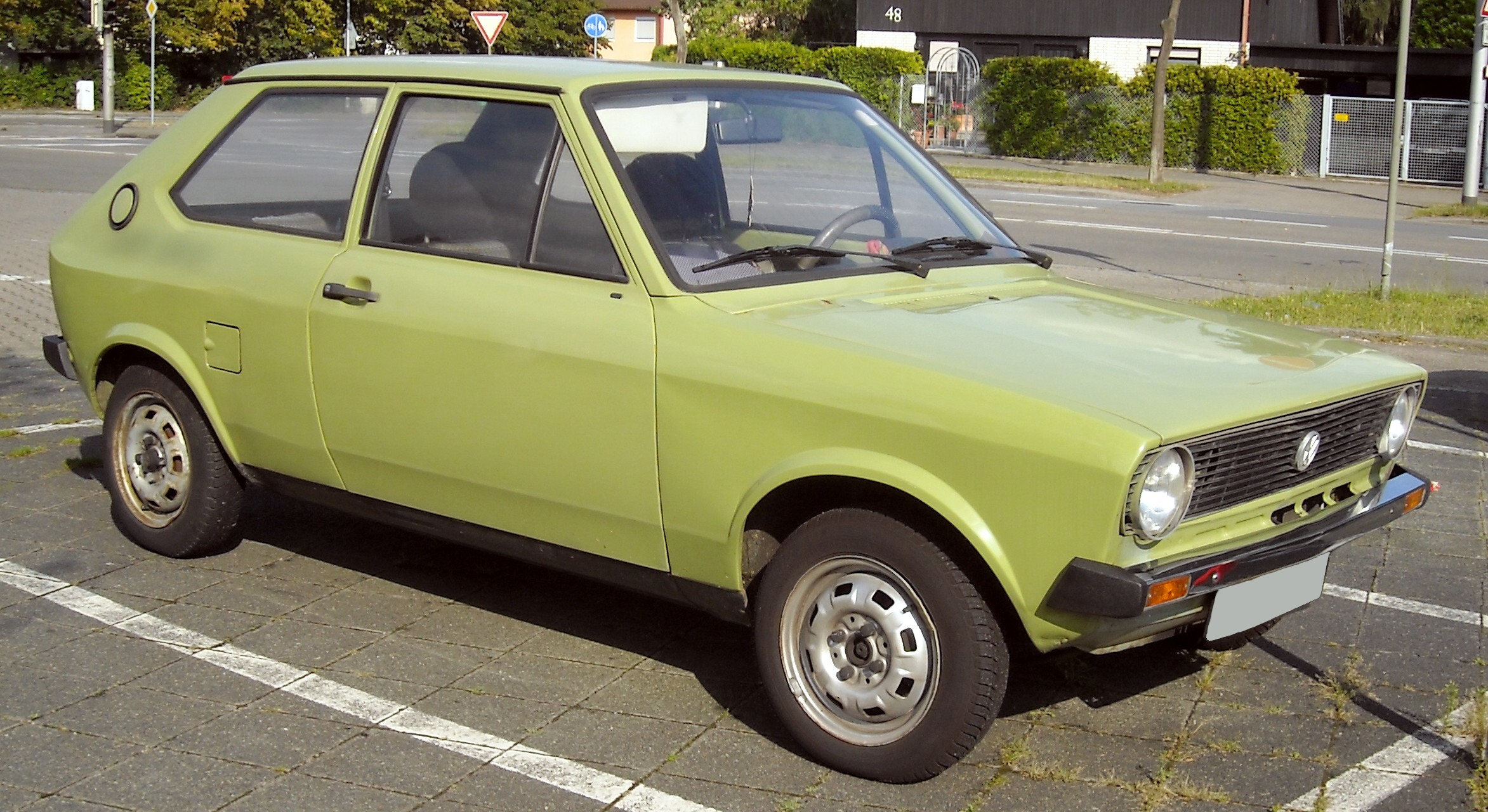
Volkswagen Polo Mk1

The first-generation Polo, a rebadged version of the Audi 50, was introduced in 1975 and was produced until October 1981. It was also called the Volkswagen Derby. By 1979, 500,000 Polos were produced worldwide. It shared the internal designation Typ 86 with the Audi 50.

The differences between the Audi and Volkswagen models were minor, with the Polo being cheaper and much more basic. The two cars were initially sold alongside each other, but the Audi 50 never sold as well, and was withdrawn in 1978. The Polo was manufactured at the Volkswagen plant in Wolfsburg.

The manufacturer let it be known that Bertone had been involved in the styling of the Polo and its Audi sibling, although the car was essentially an in-house Audi design, with the Italian design studio's contribution restricted to the circular extractor vent cover at the base of the C pillar, and the small "flick-up" at the rear end of the waistline.

In 1977, the Derby saloon was released, which was simply a Polo, identical to the hatchback from the C-pillar forward, with a large boot attached.

The Mark 1 Polo and Derby were facelifted in 1979 (unofficially referred to as the Mark 1F) with plastic bumpers, a different front grille, and a revised dashboard. The round headlights of the Derby were replaced with square ones, bringing it in line with the similar Golf-based Jetta saloon.

== Second generation (86C; 1981) ==
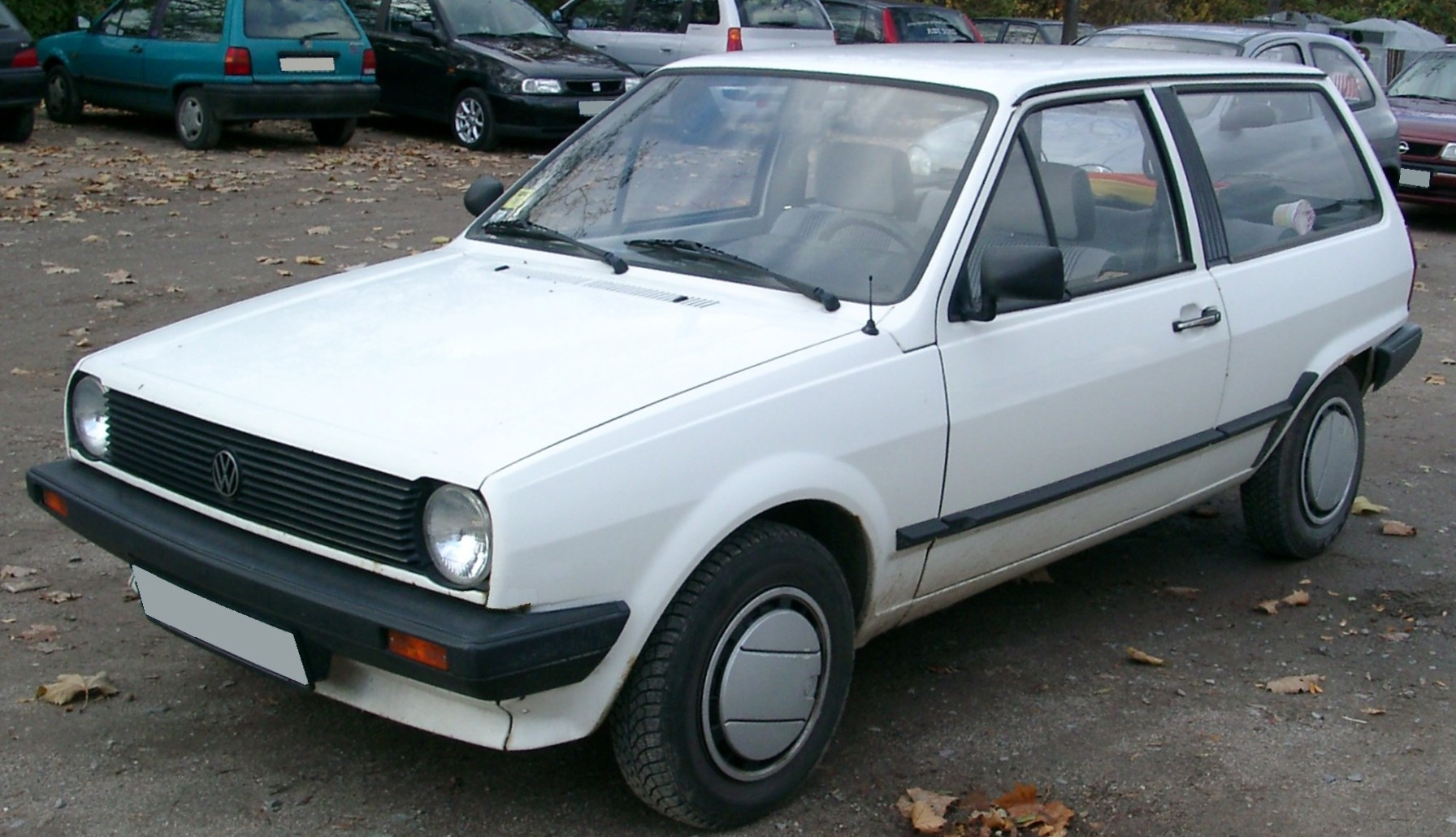
Volkswagen Polo Mk2

The Polo Mk2 (or Typ 86C) was introduced in October 1981, with the major change being the introduction of a third body style with a steep (almost vertical) rear window, in addition to a version resembling the original Mk1 shape with a diagonal rear window. The original body style was simply called the Volkswagen Polo without a suffix in most markets (steilheck, "steep tail" in Germany) while the more traditional design was typically marketed as the Polo Coupé - although in fact, both were three-door hatchbacks. In some markets, the steilheck design was designated a Wagon. The saloon version received the name Volkswagen Derby, although it later became the Polo Sedan. Production was expanded to Spain in the mid-1980s following Volkswagen's takeover of SEAT. By 1983, the one-millionth Polo was produced. The second million were produced by 1986.

The Polo competed in the supermini sector with its new rivals such as the Austin Metro and Ford Fiesta, and it was one of the largest superminis in production at this time, meaning that it was close to larger cars, including the Ford Escort in terms of size, space, and price. Within two years of its launch, however, it was faced with competition from a wave of new rivals, particularly the Fiat Uno and Peugeot 205.

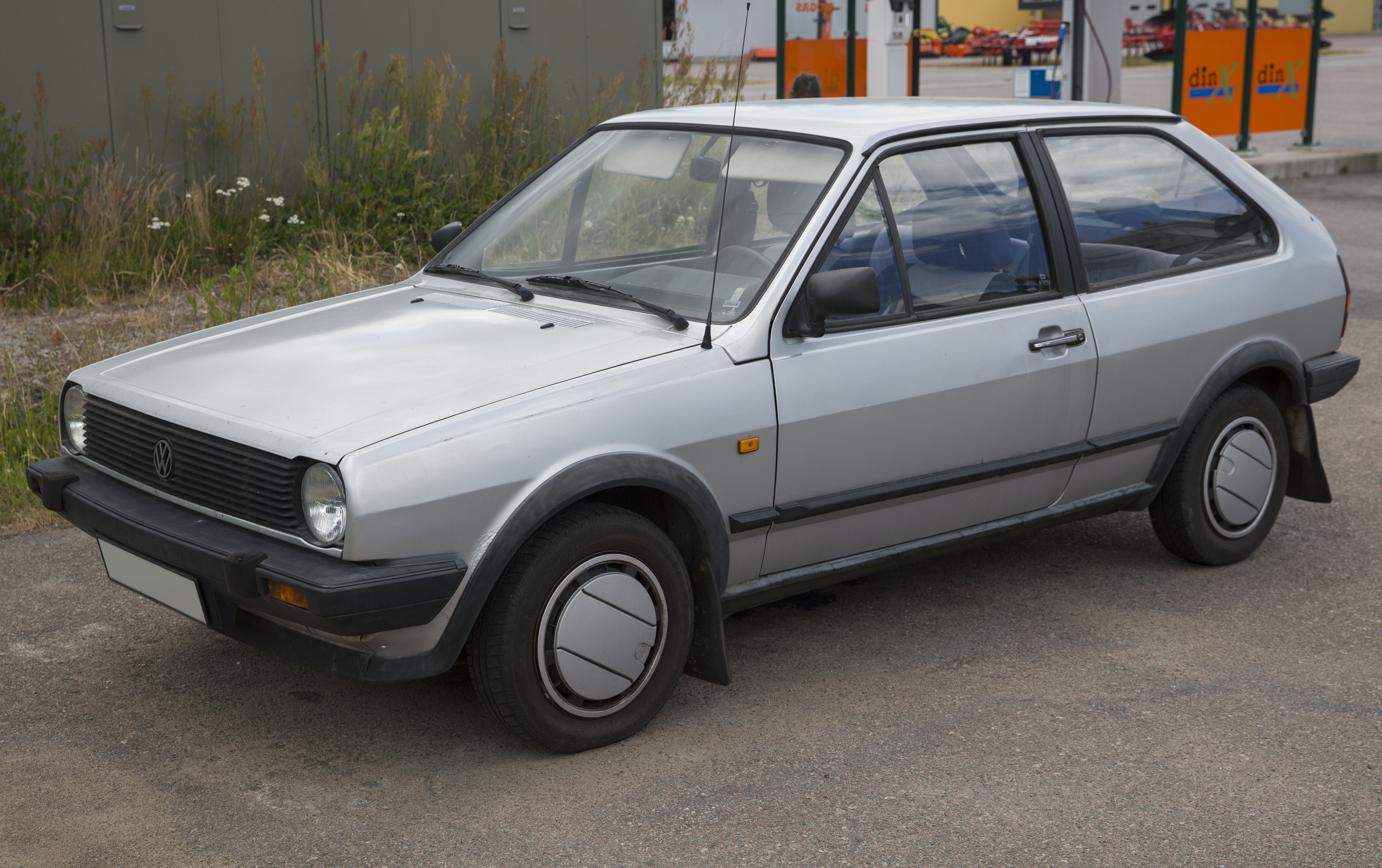
1987 Volkswagen Polo (Mk2) L Coupé

The Polo Mk2 was used extensively by Volkswagen to develop future innovations, for example supercharging with a 40-mm G-Lader supercharger in the GT G40 version. A 60-mm G-Lader would later be used on the larger and more technically challenging G60 engine used in the Golf and Corrado.

A fuel-efficient two-cylinder diesel was prototyped in the mid-1980s with a G40 supercharger to overcome its small capacity, although this did not enter production. A high fuel-efficiency model that did make production was the petrol-engined Formel E (E for economy), introduced at the launch in 1981 with a 1.1-litre engine and from 1983 with a 1.3-litre engine, overdrive top-gear ratio and an early stop-start ignition system (called "SSA"), which would cut the engine when idle for more than two seconds to save fuel whilst temporarily stopped in traffic, and restart the engine on moving the gear lever to the left in neutral.

Similar systems were later used on the Volkswagen Golf Mk3 and various systems from other car manufacturers.

It was a popular import in the UK, competing with the likes of the Peugeot 205, Fiat Uno, and Nissan Micra. While of an outdated design, its reliability and build quality were among the best to be found on a small car of this era. In the years since then, it went on to achieve a higher survival rate than many of its competitors.

However, some engines were only available on certain markets. For example, the British market never received any diesel-engined versions of the Polo, though the diesel engine was already available on many similar cars by the end of the 1980s, namely the Ford Fiesta, Vauxhall Nova, and Peugeot 205.

=== Facelift (1990–1994) ===
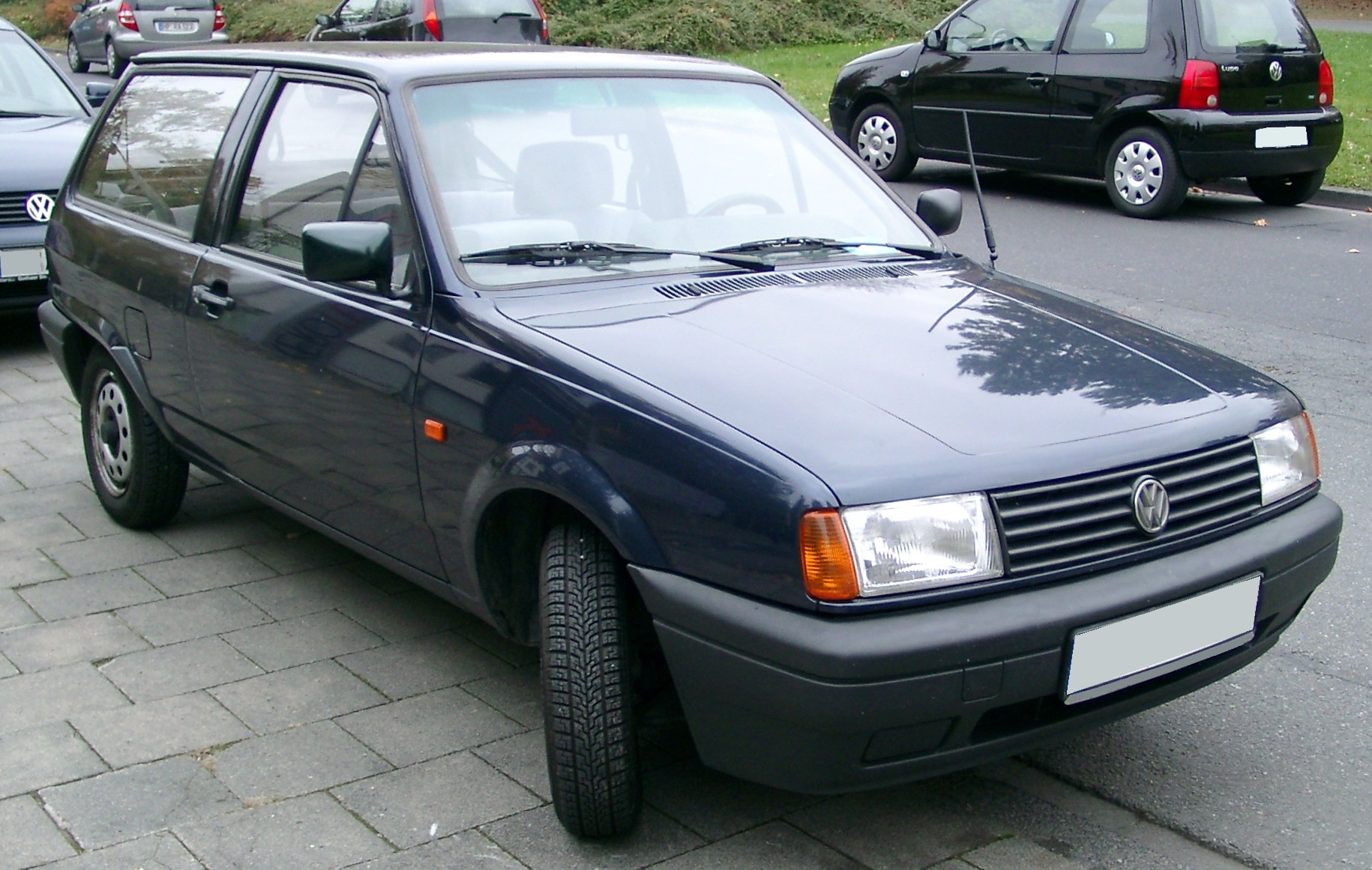
1990 Volkswagen Polo Mk2 facelift

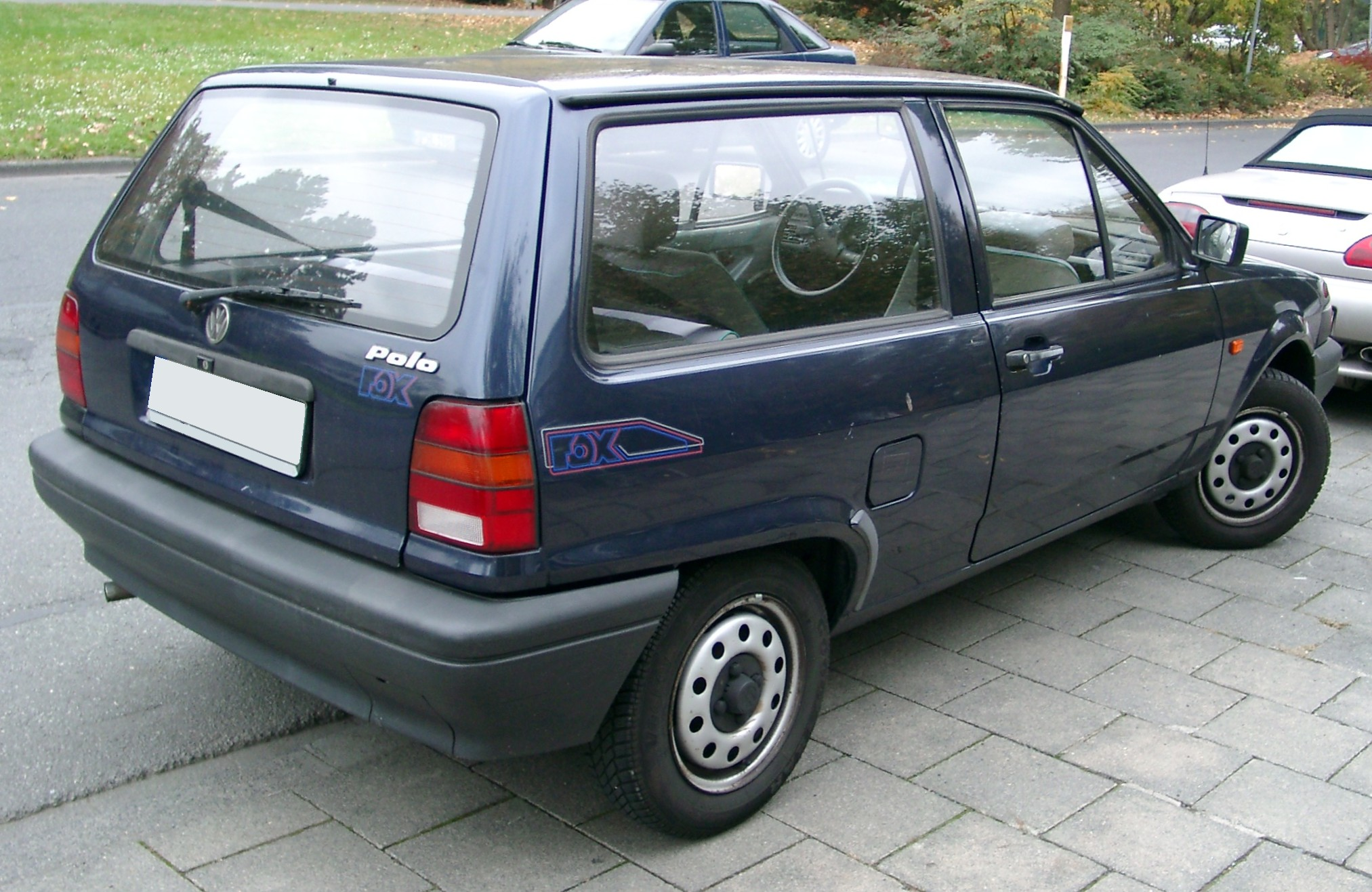
1990 Volkswagen Polo Mk2 facelift rear

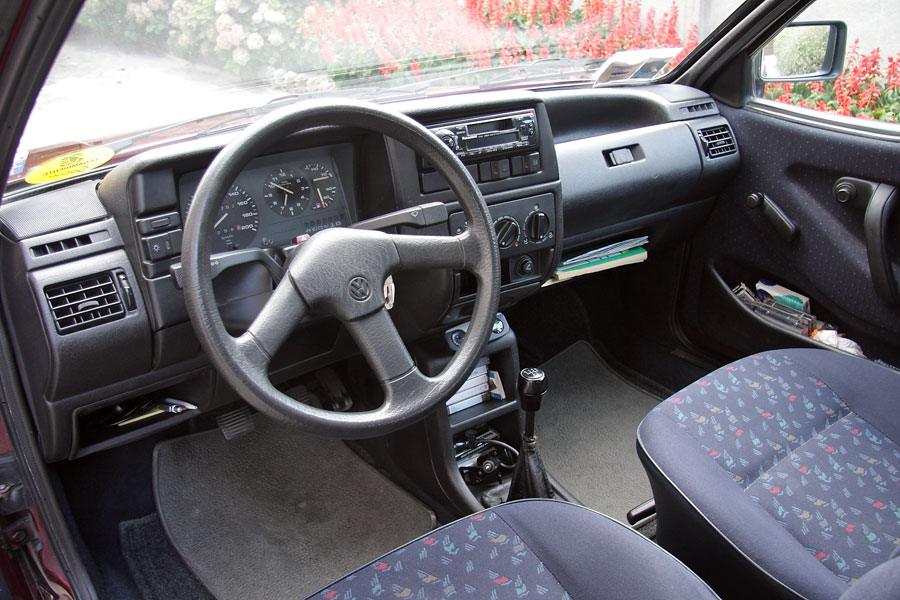
Interior

The Mark II Facelift (referred to as the Mark IIF, also erroneously known as the "Mark 3") was a far-reaching facelift of the MkII, including a reskin of the bodywork, launched in the autumn of 1990. The new look had square headlights, enlarged and reshaped taillights, bigger bumpers, and a new interior (dashboard and door trim). The three different body styles were maintained. Under the skin, the car received modifications to the chassis, suspension, and brakes, as well as the cosmetic differences. The new Polo retained the previous four-cylinder engines, but now as well as the carburetted 1.0-litre, a fuel-injected model was available with single-point injection, and all engines came with a catalytic converter as standard to combat tightening European emissions regulations. The saloon was only produced in Spain, and production ceased in 1992 due to disappointing sales.

At the time of launch of the Mark IIF Polo, the highest-performance model was the Polo GT. This featured a multipoint fuel-injected version of the 1272-cc engine, and a top speed more than 100 mph. This produced 75 PS (55 kW) and had a quoted top speed of 172 km/h (107 mph). Times for 0–60 stood at 11.1 seconds. The defining features of the GT include red piping in the bumpers, black overhead cloth, a tachometer, and a red "GT" badge in the grille. This was succeeded by the launch of the G40 in May 1991, displacing the GT as the most powerful Polo at the time, with a top speed around 120 mph – rivalling the likes of the Ford Fiesta XR2i, Peugeot 205 GTI, and Renault Clio 16v.

Soon after the launch of the Mark IIF, another sporting model was added to the range — a new version of the supercharged G40, now as a full production model in all markets rather than the limited batch of Mark II G40s. As with the previous model, Volkswagen Motorsport modified G40 Cup cars were sold for racing in a one-make series, the Volkswagen Polo G40 Cup. Features that define the G40 from other Polo models at the time (on top of the GT) include a bee-sting aerial, BBS cross-spoke alloy wheels, Le Mans interior trim, and front and rear red "G40" badges.

== Third generation (6N/6KV; 1994) ==
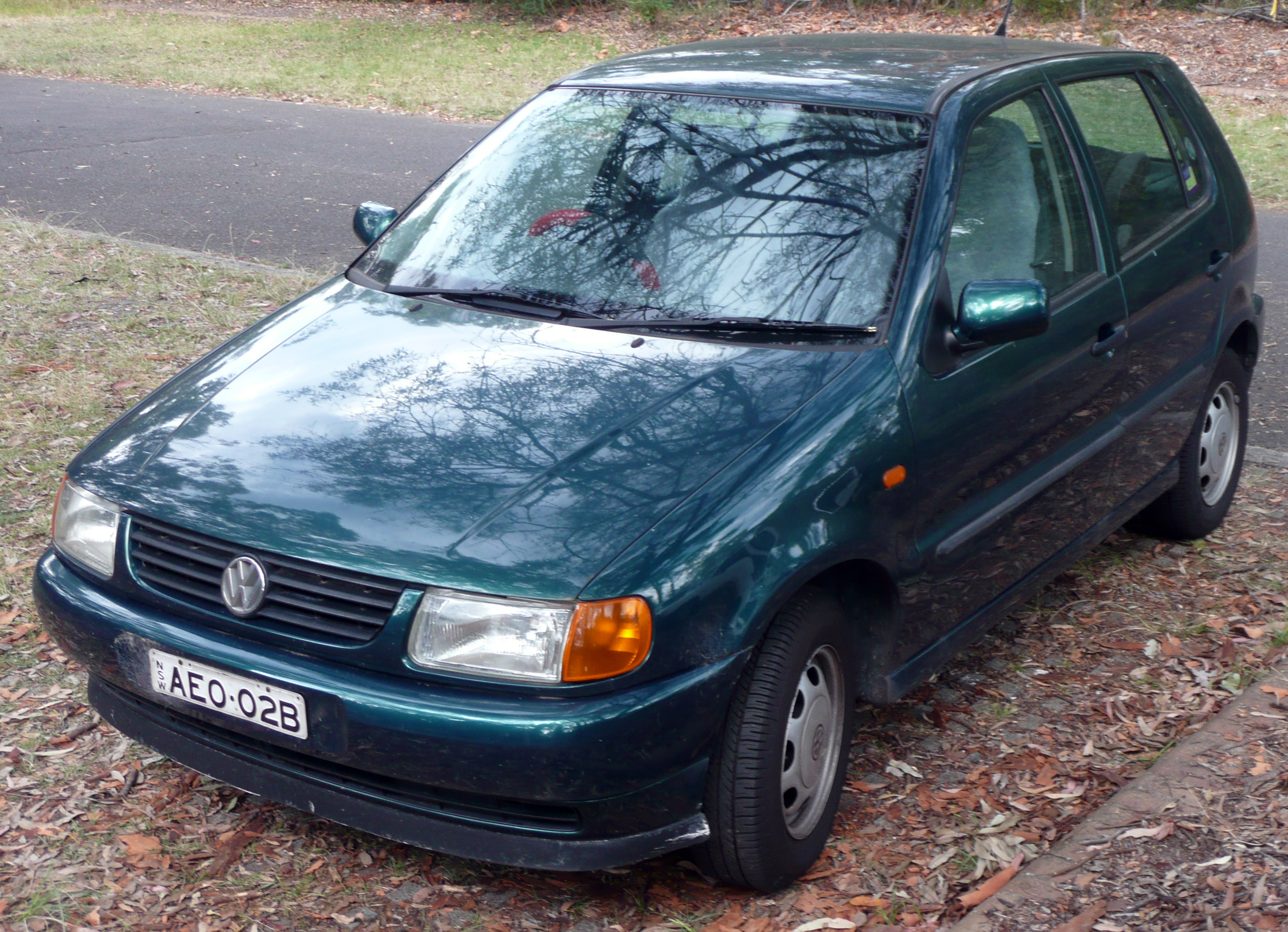
Volkswagen Polo Mk3

The Mark III Polo or Typ 6N, (sometimes referred to as the "Mark 4" by enthusiasts as it is the Polo's fourth guise) appeared in 1994, and was a completely new model (on a new chassis), available as three- and five-door hatchback versions, the latter making VW the last major European manufacturer to finally offer rear side doors in this class. It shared its platform with the SEAT Ibiza Mark 2. This platform actually used the floorpan of the Volkswagen Golf Mk3 (a multitude of mechanical parts and all of the suspension components were interchangeable among the three models). Although the dashboard and a number of mechanical components, including engines, were shared with the Ibiza, outwardly the two cars were different, with no shared body panels.

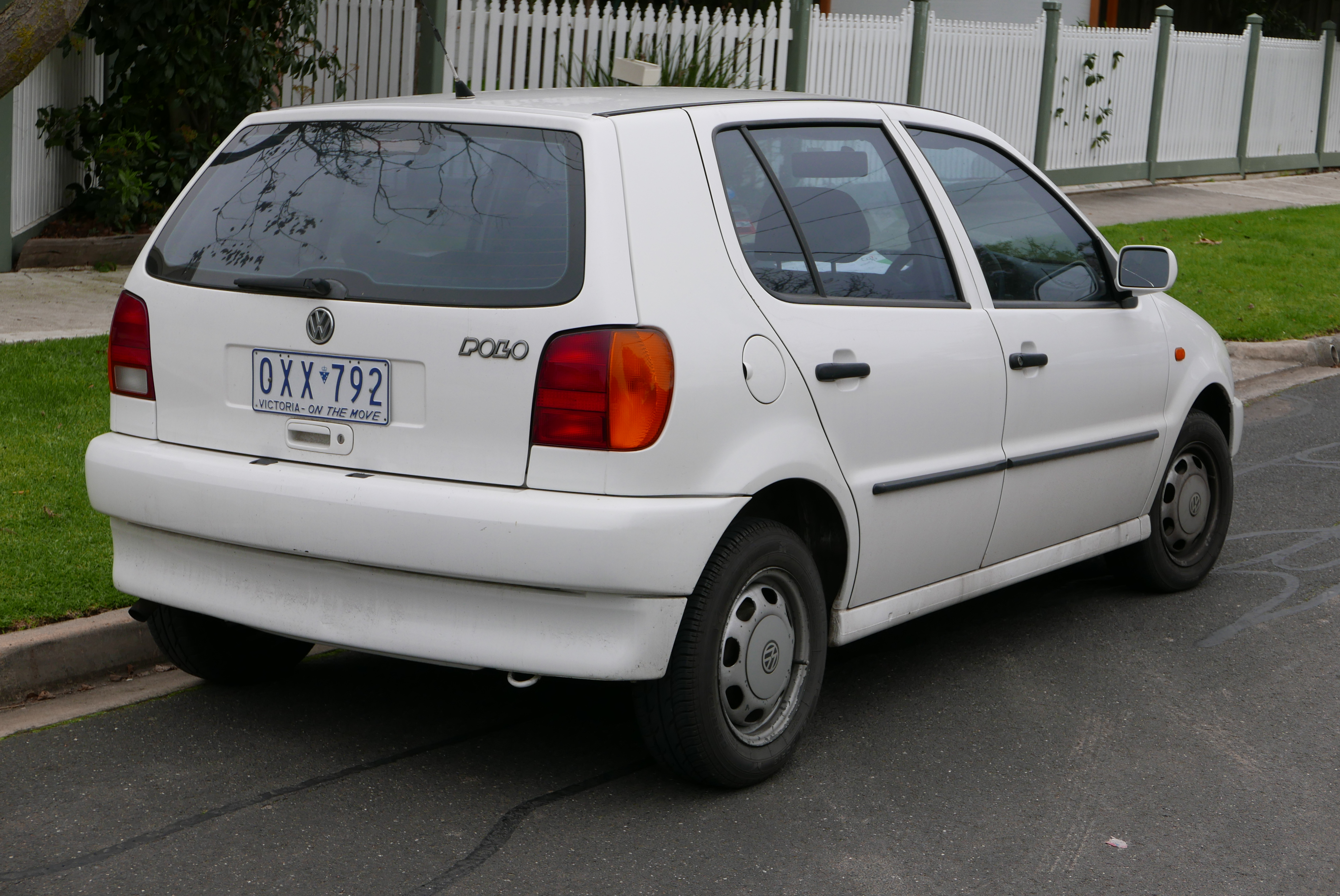
1997 Volkswagen Polo five-door hatchback (Australia; before facelift) rear

An all-new 1.0-litre petrol engine was added to the range from launch, while the 1.3-litre petrol engine from the MK2 was briefly carried over. Also new to the range were 1.4- (8-valve or 16-valve) and 1.6-litre petrol engines, as well as a 1.9-litre diesel (with or without a turbocharger).

The saloon and estate versions of the Mark III, which debuted in 1995, were essentially rebadged version of the SEAT Córdoba, which were launched early in 1994. They were referred to internally by Volkswagen as the Typ 6KV, and shared body panels with the SEAT model rather than the Polo hatchback models, with some cosmetic alterations such as new rear and front bumpers and headlights. The Volkswagen Caddy 9K van also shares the same platform and front-end styling as the 6KV models.

The later Volkswagen Lupo and SEAT Arosa city cars were based on a shortened version of the Typ 6N platform and shared many components.

=== Polo Playa (1996–2003) ===
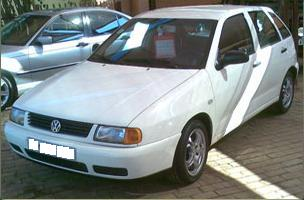
Volkswagen Polo Playa

The Volkswagen Polo Playa was a model for the South African market, where the SEAT brand was not available. It was sold instead of the European Polo Mark III from 1996 until 2002 and was effectively a rebadged SEAT Ibiza Mark II. In 2002, the Mark IV Polo was adopted in South Africa, and the separate Polo Playa model was dropped.

== Fourth generation (6Q/9N/9N3; 2001) ==
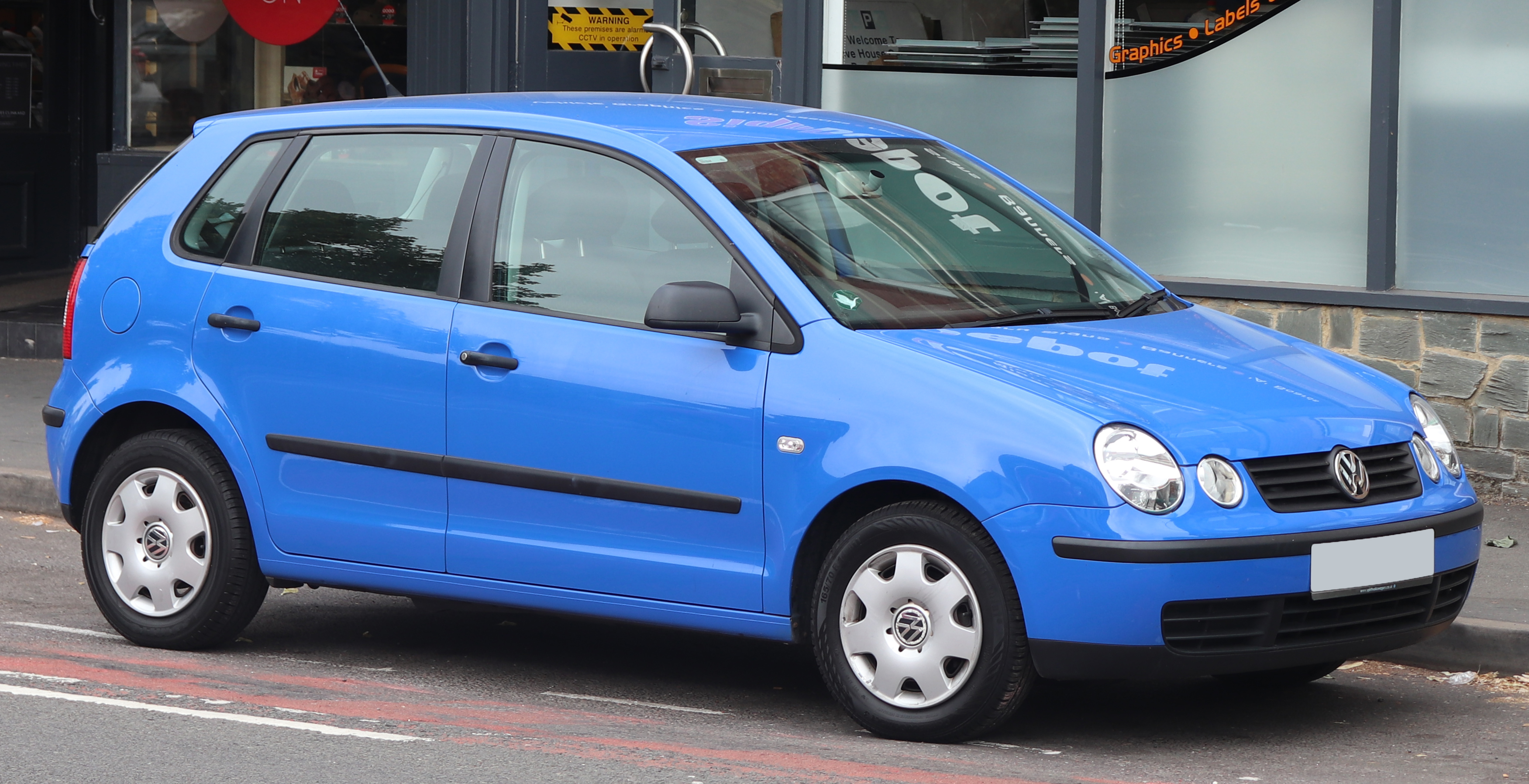
Volkswagen Polo Mk4

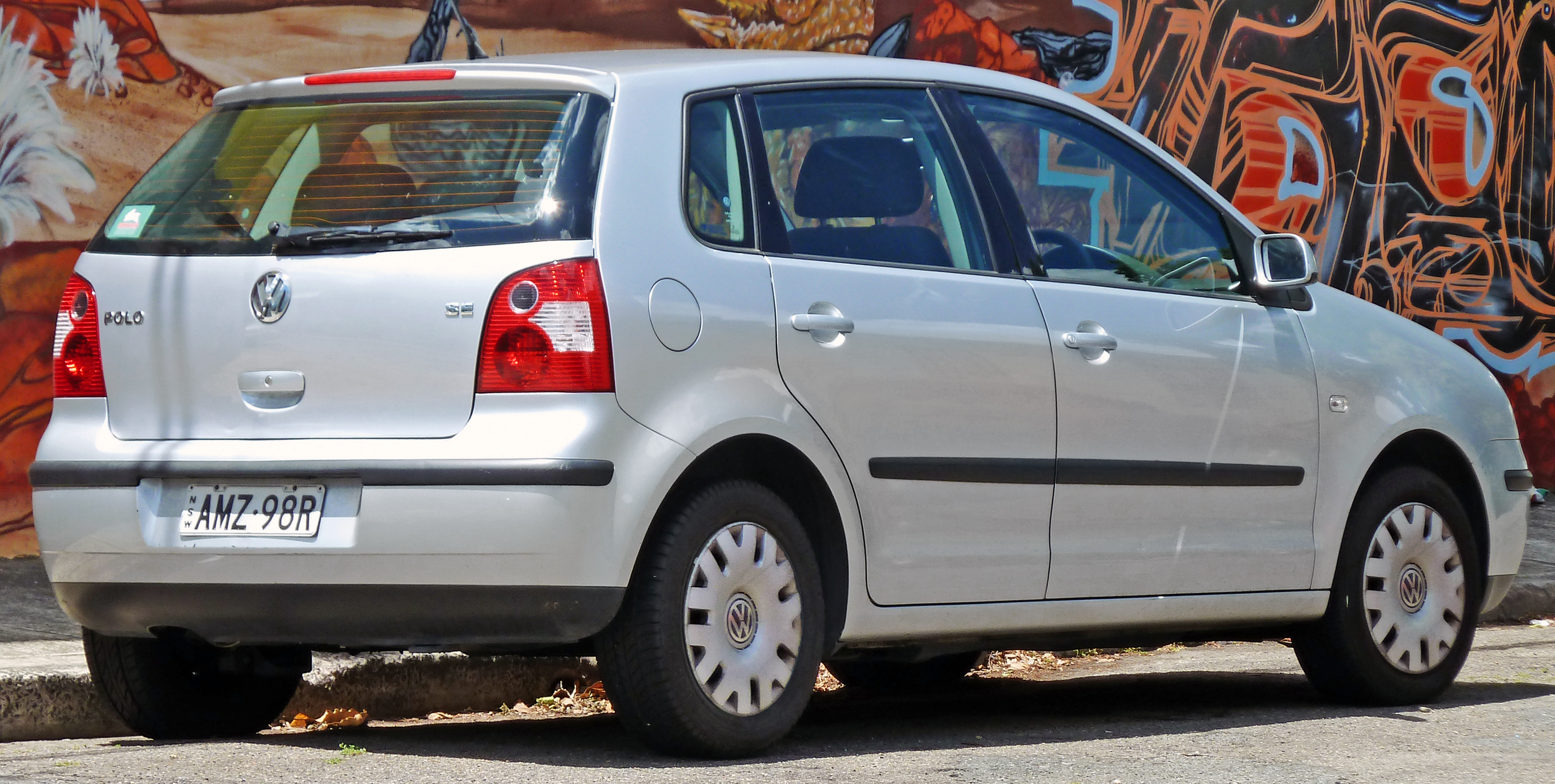
Volkswagen Polo SE 5-door hatchback (Australia; before facelift)

Unveiled in September 2001, the all-new Mark IV (or Typ 9N, sometimes erroneously referred to as the "Mark 4") model was put on sale in early 2002. It shares its platform with the SEAT Ibiza Mk3, Škoda Fabia Mk1, and Škoda Fabia Mk2. The car is all new compared to the Mark III/F and bears structural resemblance to Golf MK4 (1J). The rear taillights resemble those of the B5.5 Passat. Outwardly, the most recognisable change is the use of quadruple round headlights similar to the Lupo's.

Volkswagen Racing rallied a Polo S1600 in the 2003 Junior World Rally Championships, winning the Turkish round. The Super 1600 developed 165 kW (221 hp)/215 to its front wheels. This version of the Polo was a mixed success in the United Kingdom. It sold reasonably well (though not as well as some earlier Polos), but several customer-satisfaction surveys by high-profile motoring magazines such as Top Gear gave the Polo a very low rating.

A saloon version of the Mk4 Polo was produced for markets outside Europe, including most Latin American countries, South Africa and China.

== Fifth generation (6R/6C/61; 2009) ==
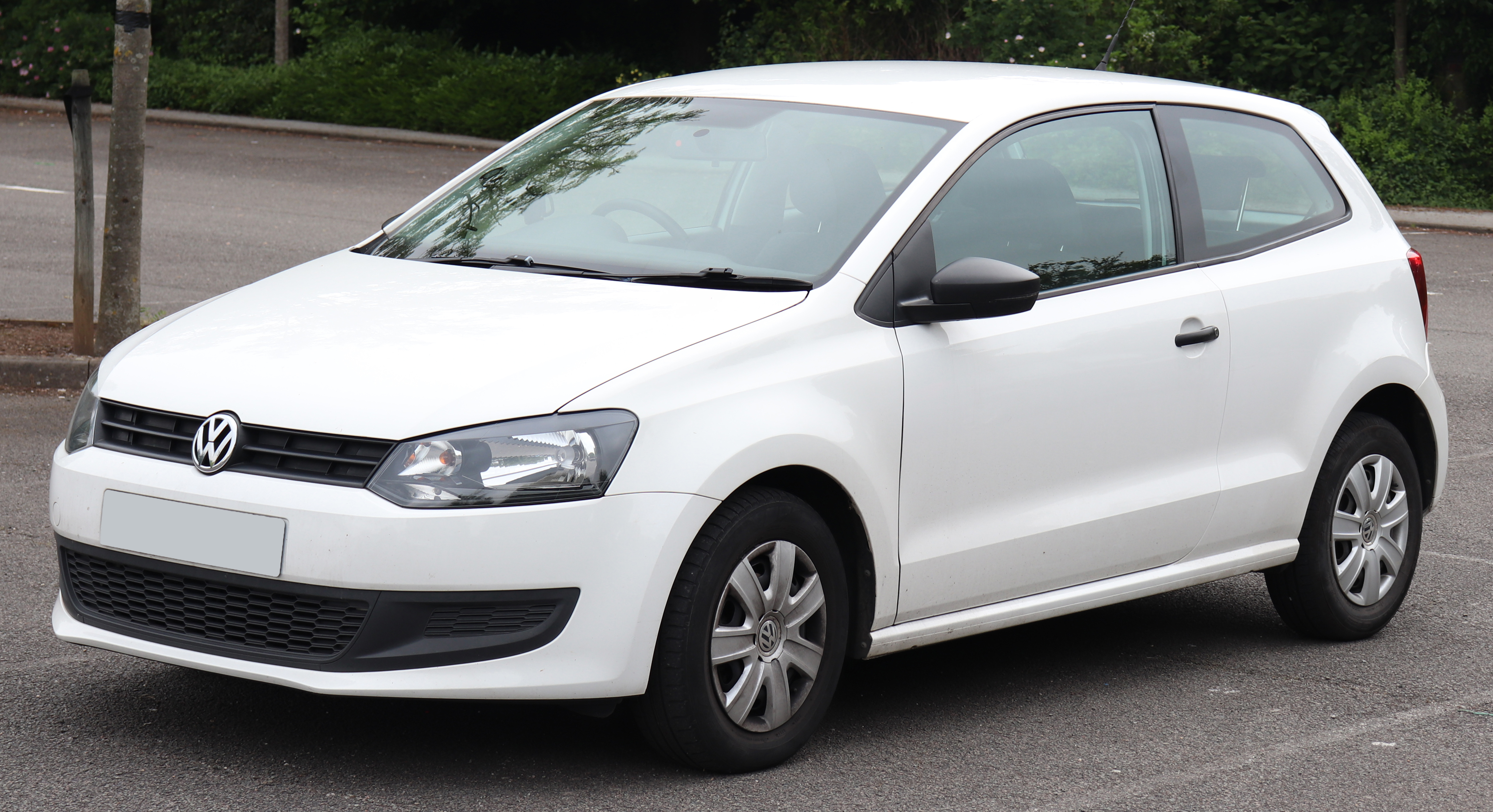
Volkswagen Polo Mk5

Volkswagen launched the fifth generation Polo (internal designation Typ 6R) at the Geneva Motor Show in March 2009. For the first time in Polo's history, the car was declared European Car of the Year, for 2010. The Polo was also declared 2010 World Car of the Year at the New York International Auto Show in April 2010. It also won What Car? Supermini of the Year 2010, as well as being awarded Japan Import Car of the Year for 2010–2011.

It shares its platform with the SEAT Ibiza Mk4 and the Audi A1. Production for the UK market started in August 2009, with first deliveries beginning in October 2009. The Polo Mark V is 44 mm longer, 32 mm wider, and sits 13 mm lower to the road than the previous generation Polo. Boot capacity is increased by 10 L to 280 L of storage space with 952 L with the seats folded down. The car is 7.5% lighter than its predecessor. The Polo has thoracic airbags and has been awarded a five-star Euro NCAP crash impact rating.

=== Saloon versions ===
==== Volkswagen Vento/Polo Sedan ====
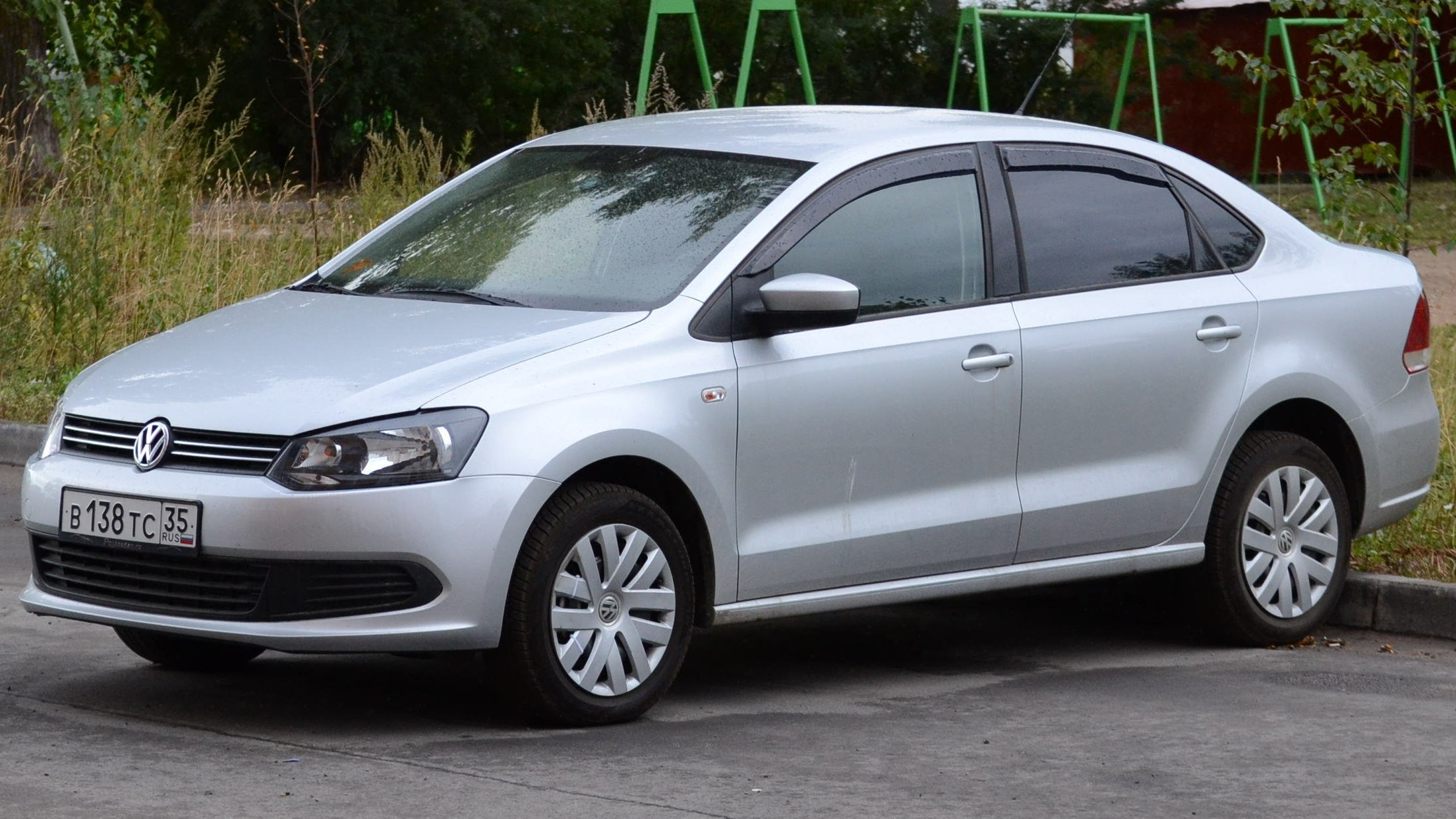
Volkswagen Polo Saloon (Russia)

In 2010, a saloon based on the Polo Mk5 platform was developed for launch in India and Russia. This saloon is known as the Vento or Polo Sedan, depending on the country. It has a length of 4,384 mm, increased wheelbase (2,552 mm) and ground clearance (168–170 mm), and had one petrol engine (1.6-litre, four-cylinder, 105 PS; coupled with either five-speed manual or six-speed automatic gearbox) and one diesel engine (1.6-litre, turbocharged four-cylinder common-rail, 105 PS; only five-speed manual gearbox) options available.

In several markets, it is succeeded by the Virtus, while some markets such as Mexico offered the Virtus alongside the Vento for the purpose of keeping a budget-friendly option. In Russia, the Polo Mk5-based Polo Saloon is succeeded by the Škoda Rapid-based Polo liftback.

==== Volkswagen Ameo ====
The Ameo is another saloon based on the Polo Mk5 which was released in June 2016. It was specifically developed for the Indian market which offers lower excise tax for vehicles shorter than 4 meter in length. The Ameo is more heavily derived from the hatchback body of the Polo, retaining its shorter wheelbase and the rear doors, unlike the larger Vento/Polo Saloon. It was discontinued in 2020 due to low demand.

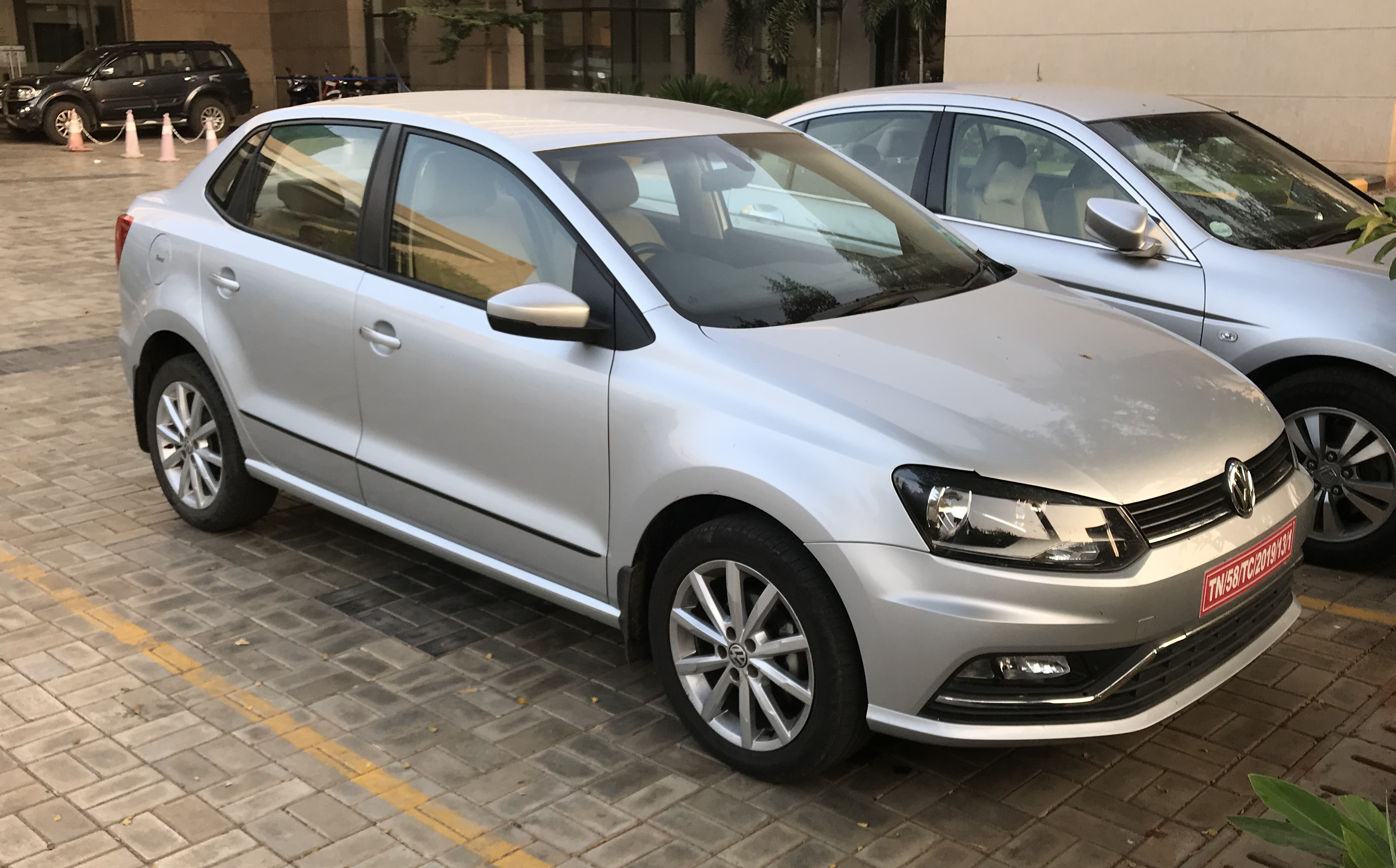
Volkswagen Ameo

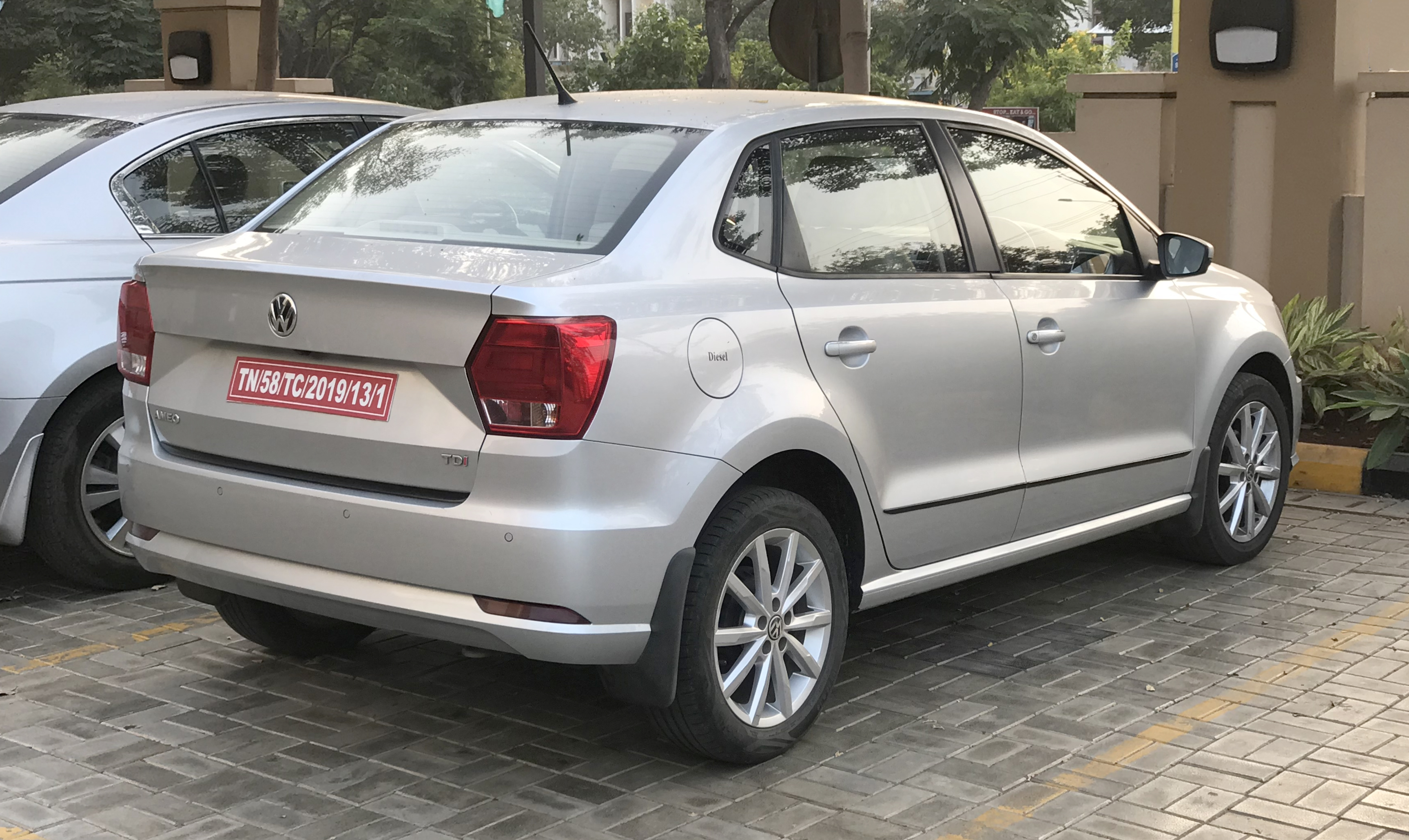
Rear view

== Sixth generation (AW/BZ; 2017) ==
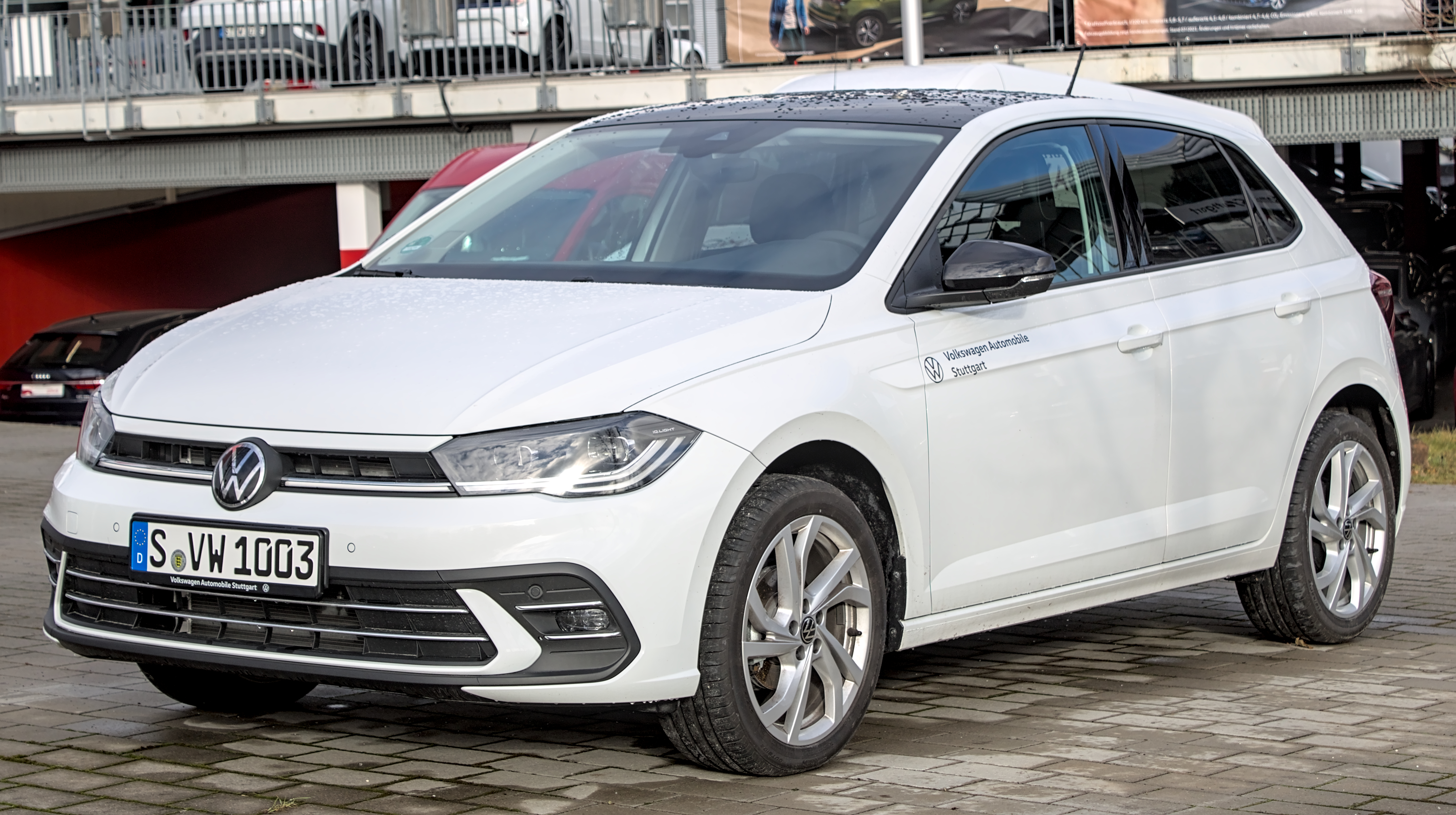
Volkswagen Polo Mk6

The sixth generation Polo was unveiled on 16 June 2017, with production starting at the Pamplona plant on 17 July 2017. Built on the Volkswagen Group's MQB A0 platform, it is the first generation Polo not to be available as a 3-door model.

The boot space has increased by around 25% from 280 to 351 litres. As an option, this generation introduces the fully digital instrument cluster called "Active Info Digital Display Cockpit", the first car in the small car segment to do so. In addition, the Polo VI introduces a series of driver assistance systems such as traffic sign recognition, blind spot assistant and automatic emergency braking. On 21 April 2021, it received a mid-cycle facelift.

=== Polo Track ===
Announced in November 2022 as a replacement for the Gol, the Polo Track was released in February 2023 as a low-cost version of the Mk6 Polo. Aimed at fleet buyers, the Track version has a shorter list of features and a simpler exterior appearance. It is powered by a 1.0-litre MPI (1.6-litre 16V MSI 105 hp for Colombia and other countries) petrol flex engine producing 85 PS (84 hp; 63 kW).

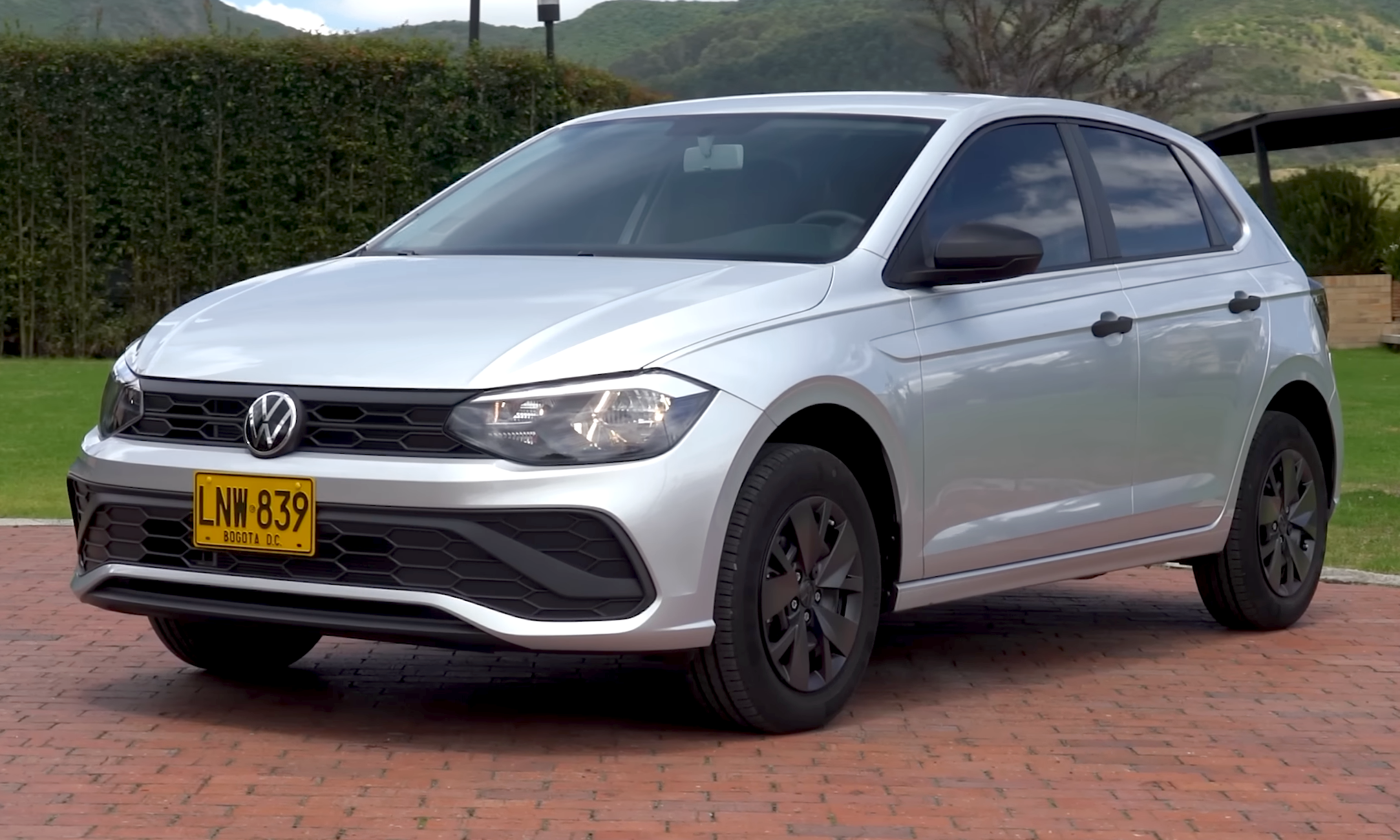
Polo Track

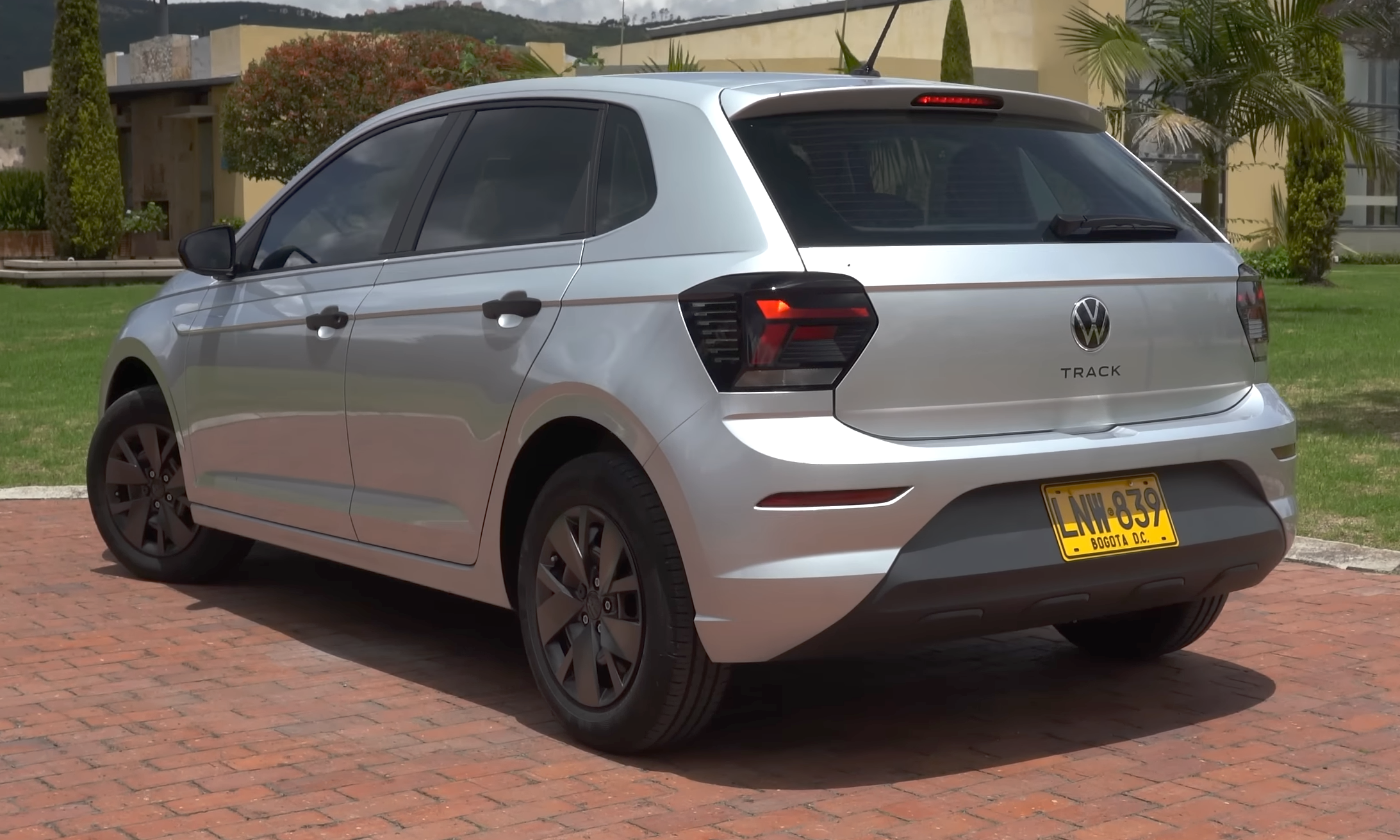
Rear view

== ID. Polo (2026) ==
Volkswagen ID. Polo

The ID. Polo is a battery electric car using the Polo nameplate sold since 2026 alongside the existing internal combustion engine model.

== GTI ==
The Volkswagen Polo GTI is a hot hatch version of the Polo.

=== Mk2 Polo GT G40 and Mk2F Polo G40 ===
The Volkswagen Polo GTI can trace its roots back to the original hot Polo, the supercharged 1.3-litre 85 kW (115 PS) G40. It was sold in the United Kingdom between 1990 and 1994 in the form of the Mk2F Polo but was available during the late 1980s in limited numbers in Europe in the form of the Mk2 Polo GT G40. The car was expensive compared to its rivals of the time, so did not sell in vast numbers. This makes it highly collectible today, and according to Top Gear, "a potential future classic."

=== Mk3 Polo GTI ===
After production of the G40 ended in 1994, Volkswagen decided to release the first GTI-branded Polo in a limited batch of just 3000. It was released in 1995 and available only in left-hand drive. It featured a 1.6-litre, 16-valve 88 kW (120 PS) engine. The GTI was not available in the UK at any stage during its limited production, so as of 1994, the UK only had the 75 kW (100 bhp) 1.4-litre, 16-valve as a model with any sporting intent.

==== Facelift (6N2) ====
Between 1999 and 2002, Volkswagen offered two sporting models — the 16V and GTI. The 16V came with the 1.4-litre, 16-valve (V), 74 kW (100 PS) engine, and had options such as 15-in Spa alloys and air conditioning. However, the GTI – available only in three- or five-door hatchback body styles in three colours being red, silver, and black, used a 1.6-litre 16-V 92 kW (125 PS) engine with variable valve timing. External changes included a deeper front splitter with honeycomb mesh grilles, lowered sports suspension (by 10 mm), a subtle rear spoiler, deeper side skirts, fog lights, and 15" BBS RXII split rims for the wheels, bearing 195/45/15 tyres. There were also standard extras such as Climatronic fully automatic air conditioning, xenon headlights with a headlight washer system, a six-disc CD autochanger with a GAMMA head unit, exclusive sports interior with leather steering wheel, handbrake and gearstick, chrome inserts, and driver aids such as ABS with EBD and an EDL (a system to aid traction). Leather and satellite navigation were also optional extras. The Polo GTI Mk3F, however, never got the new six-speed gearbox that was introduced in the smaller Volkswagen Lupo GTI, which shared the same engine.

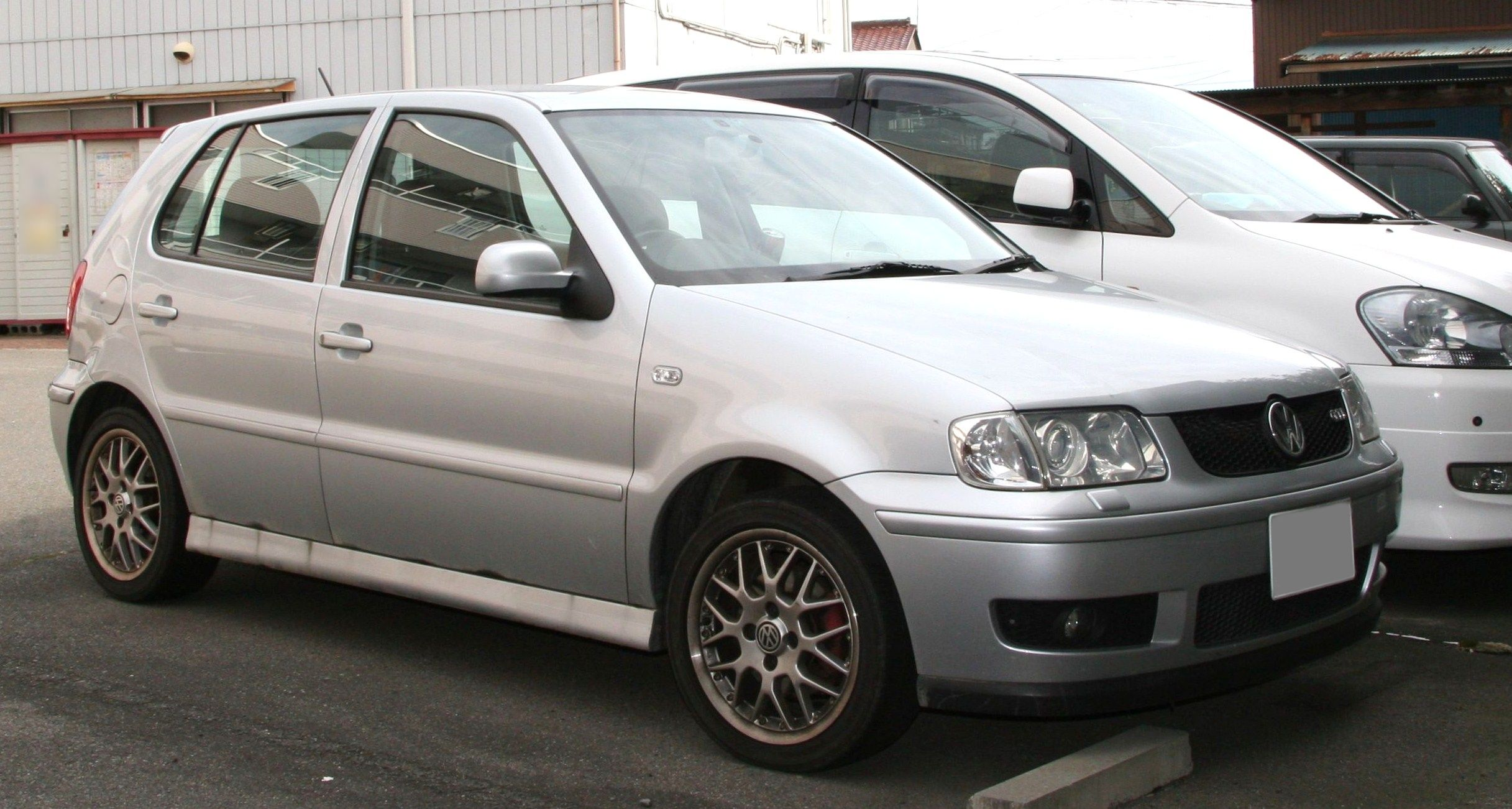
Front view

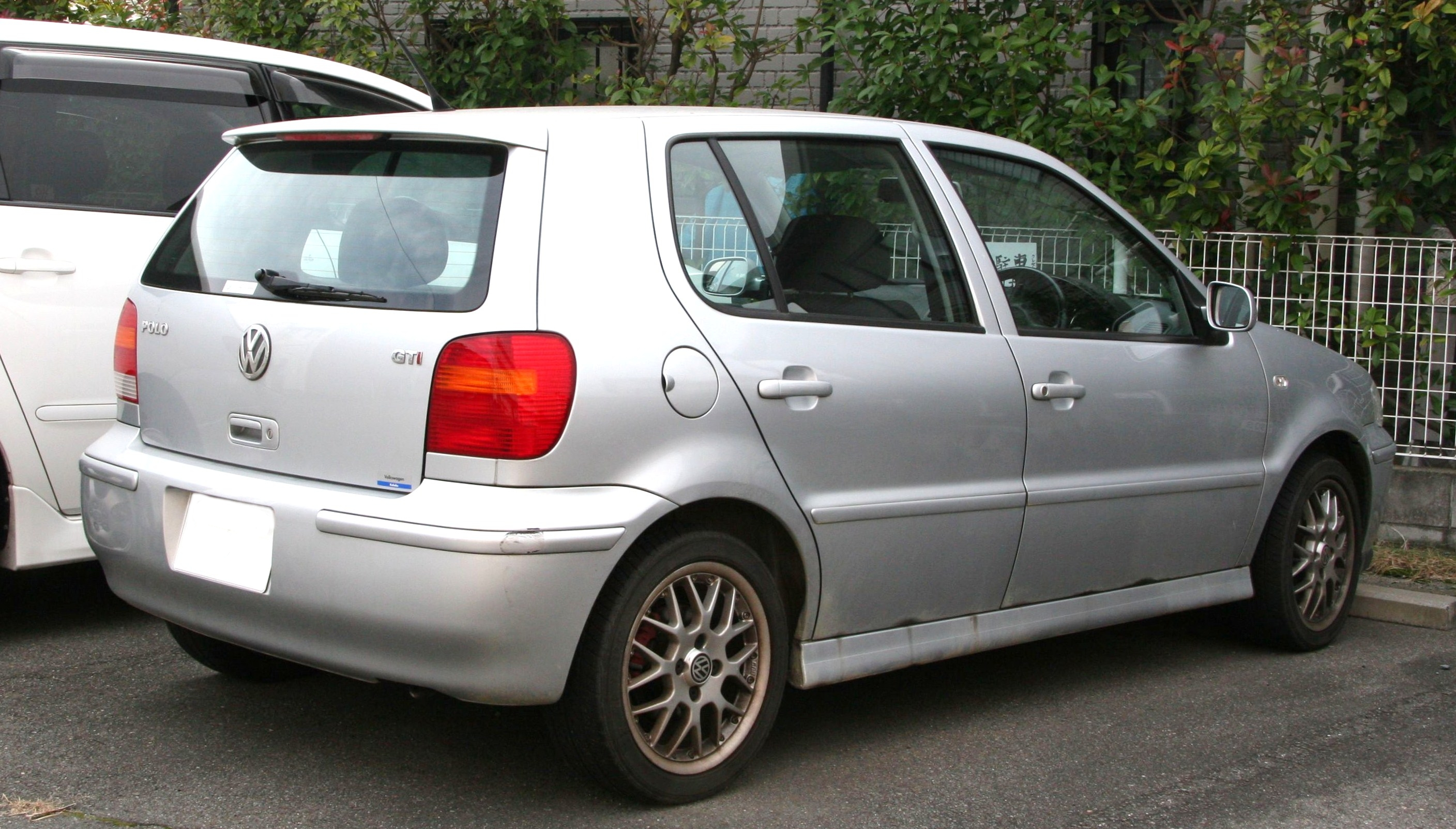
Rear view

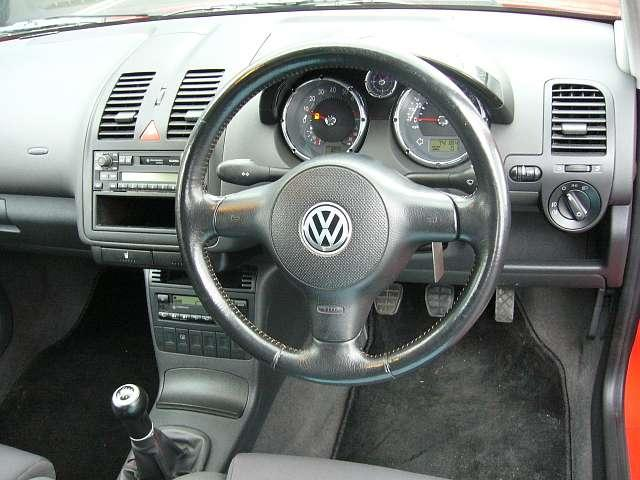
Interior

=== Mk4 Polo GT ===
With the introduction of the 2002 Polo, the GTI model was discontinued and was given no direct replacement. A GT model, though, was produced, featuring the same 1.9-litre TDI, 96 kW (130 PS) engine found in the popular Škoda Fabia vRS and SEAT Ibiza FR TDI, as well as a six-speed gearbox. Although this model had a relatively slow 0–100 km/h (62 mph) time over 9 seconds, it did have impressive midrange clout with torque figures of 310 Nm (228 lb-ft).

=== Mk4 Polo GTI ===
The GTI was not released until late 2005, after yet another Polo revamp was reintroduced. This time it boasted a 1.8-litre, 110 kW (150 PS) engine, which had been used in models from the Mk4 Volkswagen Golf GTI to the Audi A6. Despite the impressive figures, this new model lacked the standard features of the Polo GTI Mk3, with xenon headlights not even on the options list, and fully digital climate control only being an expensive option. Although faster than the 2000–2002 Polo GTI, the newer model was also seen as being off the pace when compared to its rivals, most of which are now nudging 150 kW (200 PS). In Europe, this led to VW quickly beefing up the Polo further to create the Polo GTI Cup Edition, which was tuned to around 130 kW (180 PS) and featured more aggressive styling, 17" wheels and larger diameter 312mm front disc brakes. The Polo GTI Cup Edition has 177 bhp, 29 bhp more than the standard Polo GTI. The standard Polo GTI model completes 0–100 km/h in 8.2 seconds, but in the Cup, it completes 0–100 km/h in 7.5 seconds.

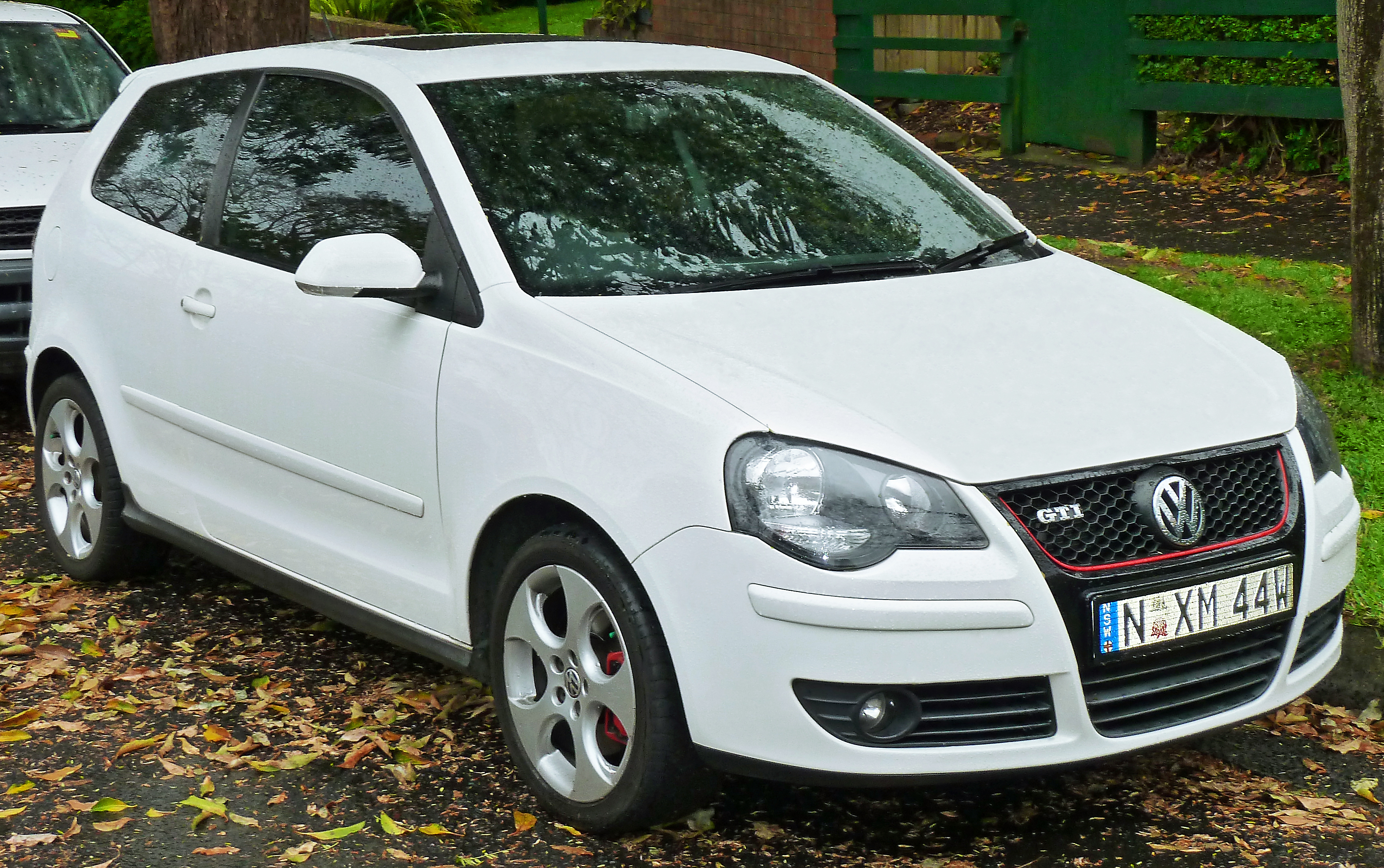
Front view

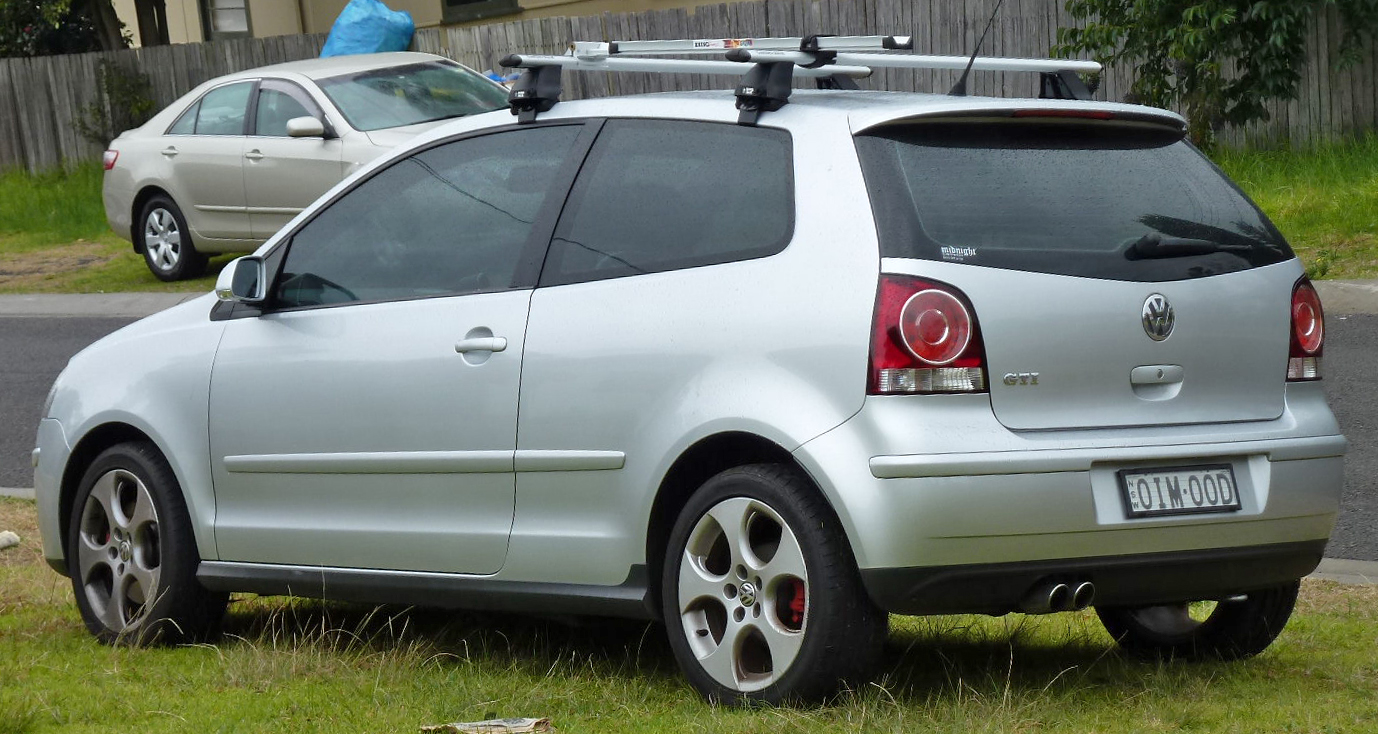
Rear view

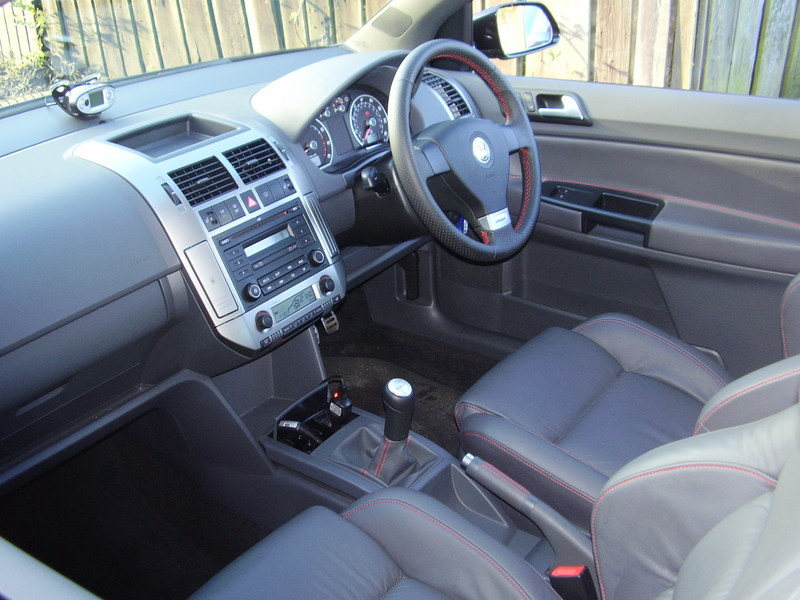
Interior

=== Mk5 Polo GTI ===
The Mk5 Polo GTI was launched at the 2010 Geneva Motor Show. The new GTI is powered by VW's award-winning 130 kW (180 PS) 1.4-litre TSI engine (adapted from that used in the current Scirocco), which uses both a supercharger and turbocharger to provide torque throughout the revolution range. The Mk5 Polo is also 7.5% lighter than its predecessor and with a 22 kW (30 PS) increase in power over the previous generation Polo GTI it accelerates from 0 to 100 km/h (62 mph) in 6.9 seconds. The Mk5 Polo also includes features not found on previous generation Polos, such as touch-screen satellite navigation and a seven-speed version of VW's DSG gearbox as standard.

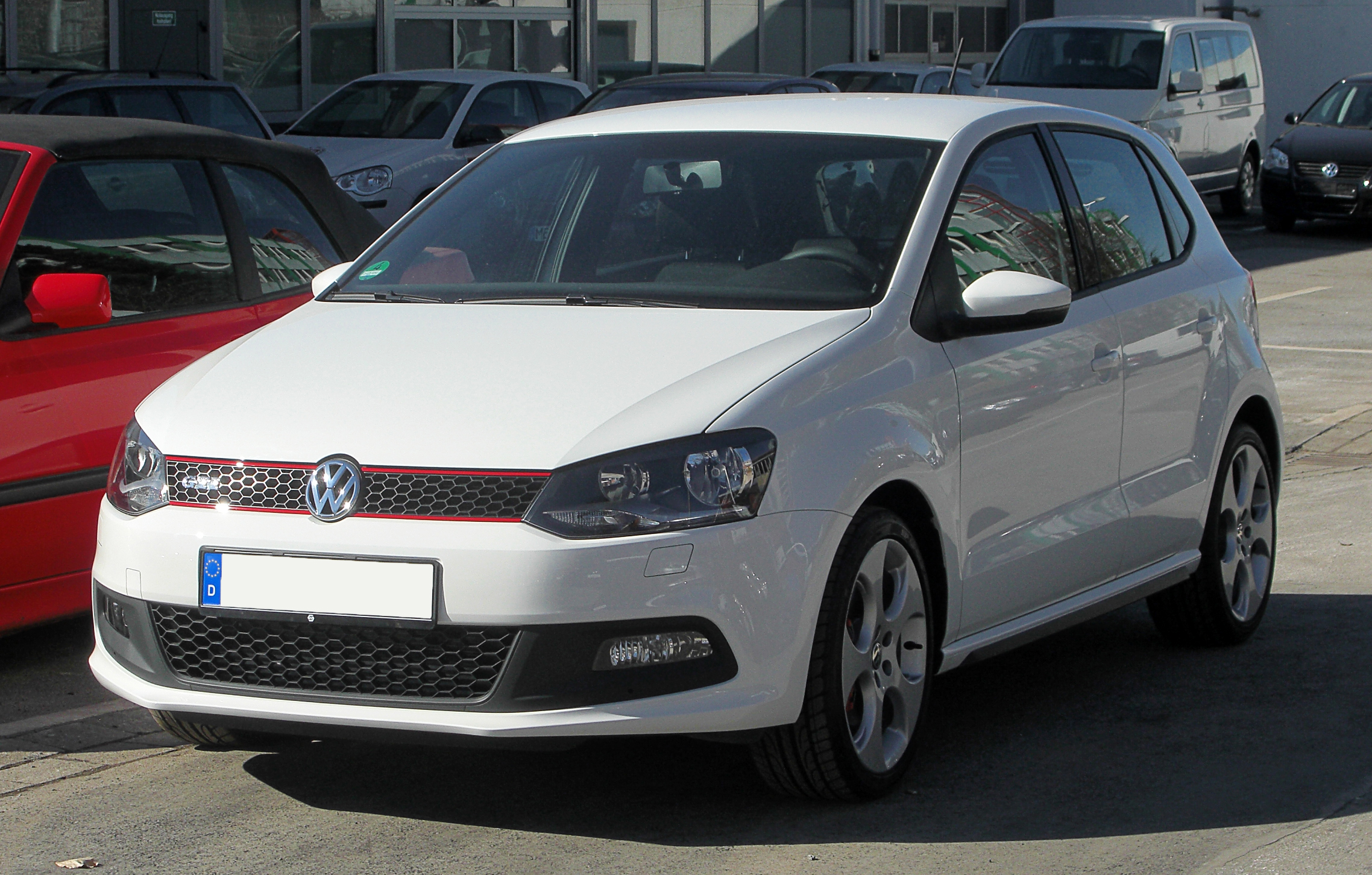
Front view (5-door)

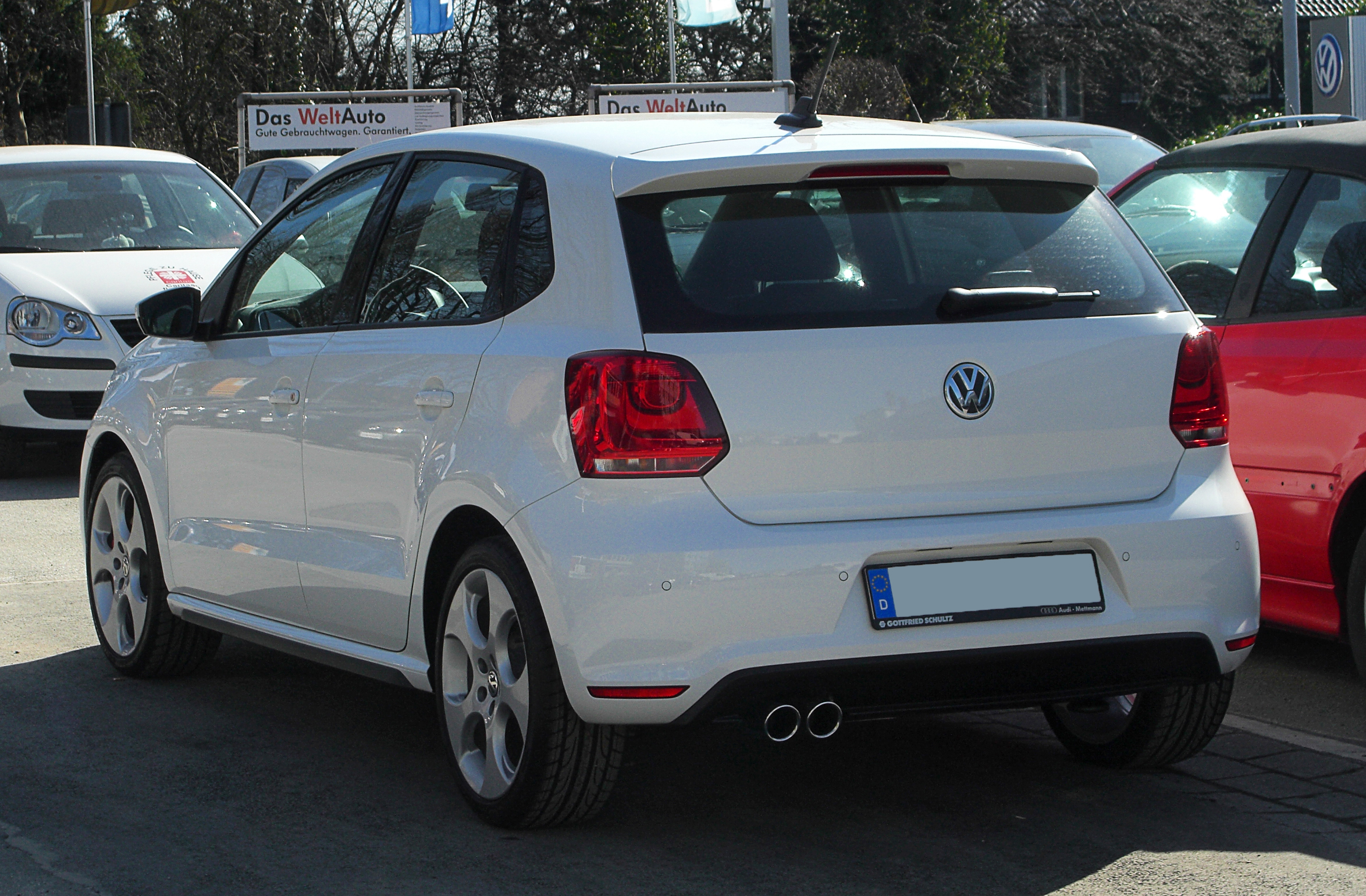
Rear view (5-door)

==== Facelift ====
The Mk5 Polo GTI facelift was launched in 2015. It featured a new 1.8-litre turbocharged engine, which had been developed by Audi. It produced 189 bhp and was capable of sprinting from 0-60 mph in 6.4 seconds (real world test). It was now also available with a manual transmission.

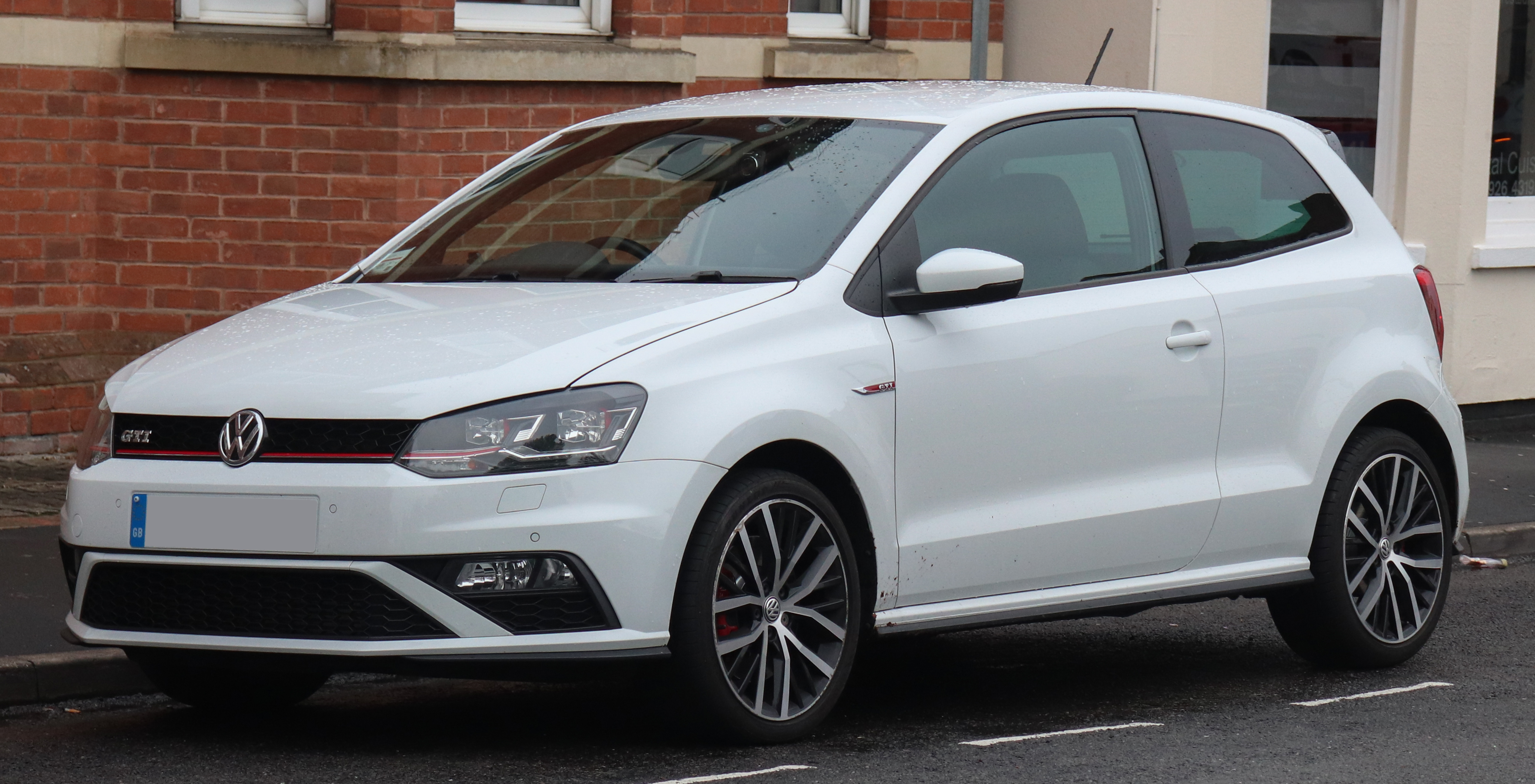
Front view (3-door)

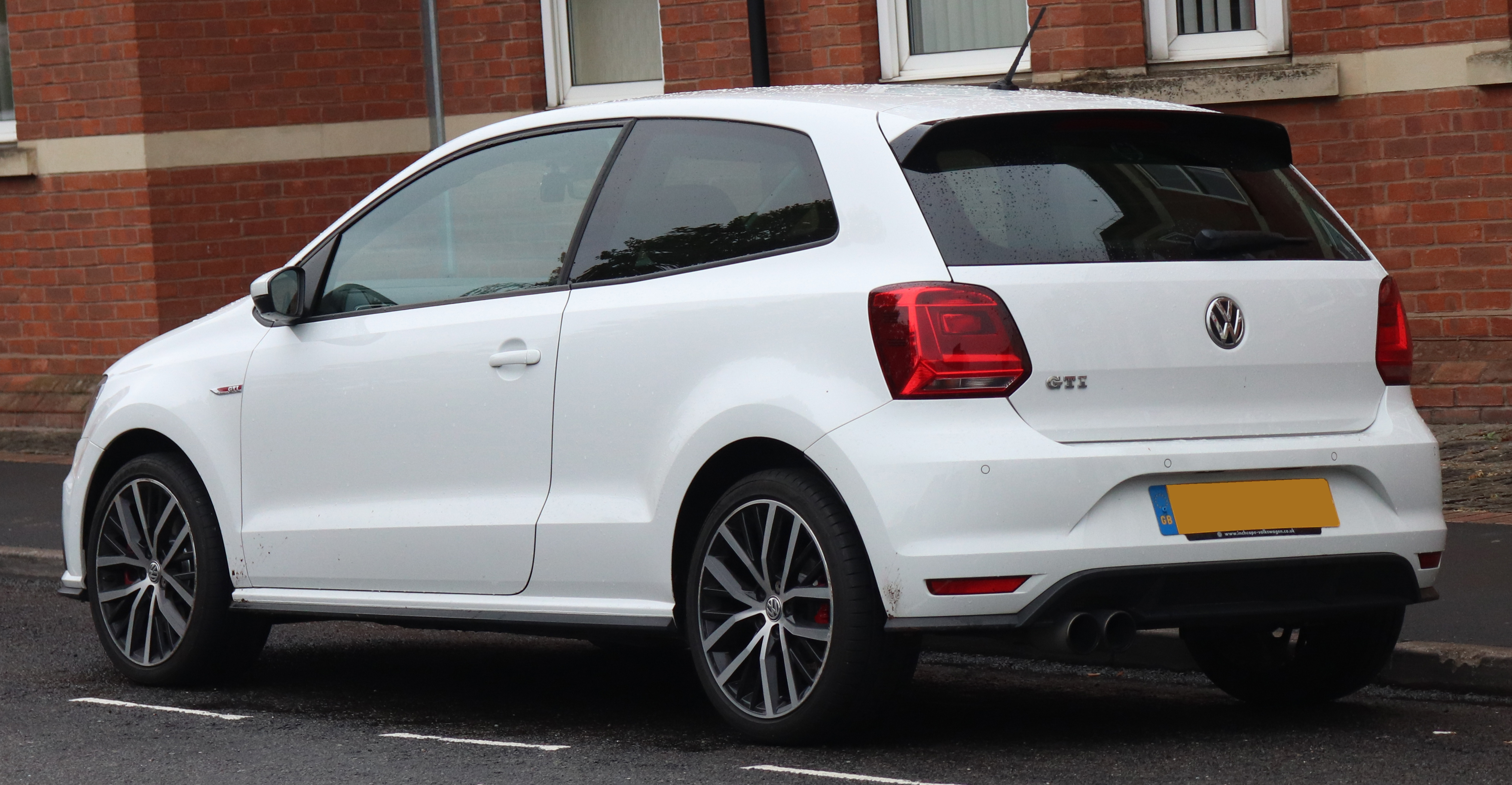
Rear view (3-door)

=== Mk6 Polo GTI ===
The Mk6 Polo GTI was launched in 2017. It features a slightly detuned version of the 2.0-litre TSI petrol engine from the Mk7 Golf GTI. It produced 200 PS (197 hp; 147 kW), an 8 PS (8 hp; 6 kW) increase over the previous 1.8-litre engine, and was capable of getting to 100 km/h (62 mph) in under 6.7 seconds. Available transmissions are a 6-speed manual or a 6-speed dq250 DSG. Along with the engine, the GTI version came standard with lowered suspension, GTI badges, GTI bumpers, 17-in wheels, sill extensions, bigger brakes, red brake calipers, twin exhausts, tartan seats, sport steering, red stitching, and a roof spoiler. It is equipped with a standard ‘sport’ chassis and optional ‘Sport Select’ chassis.

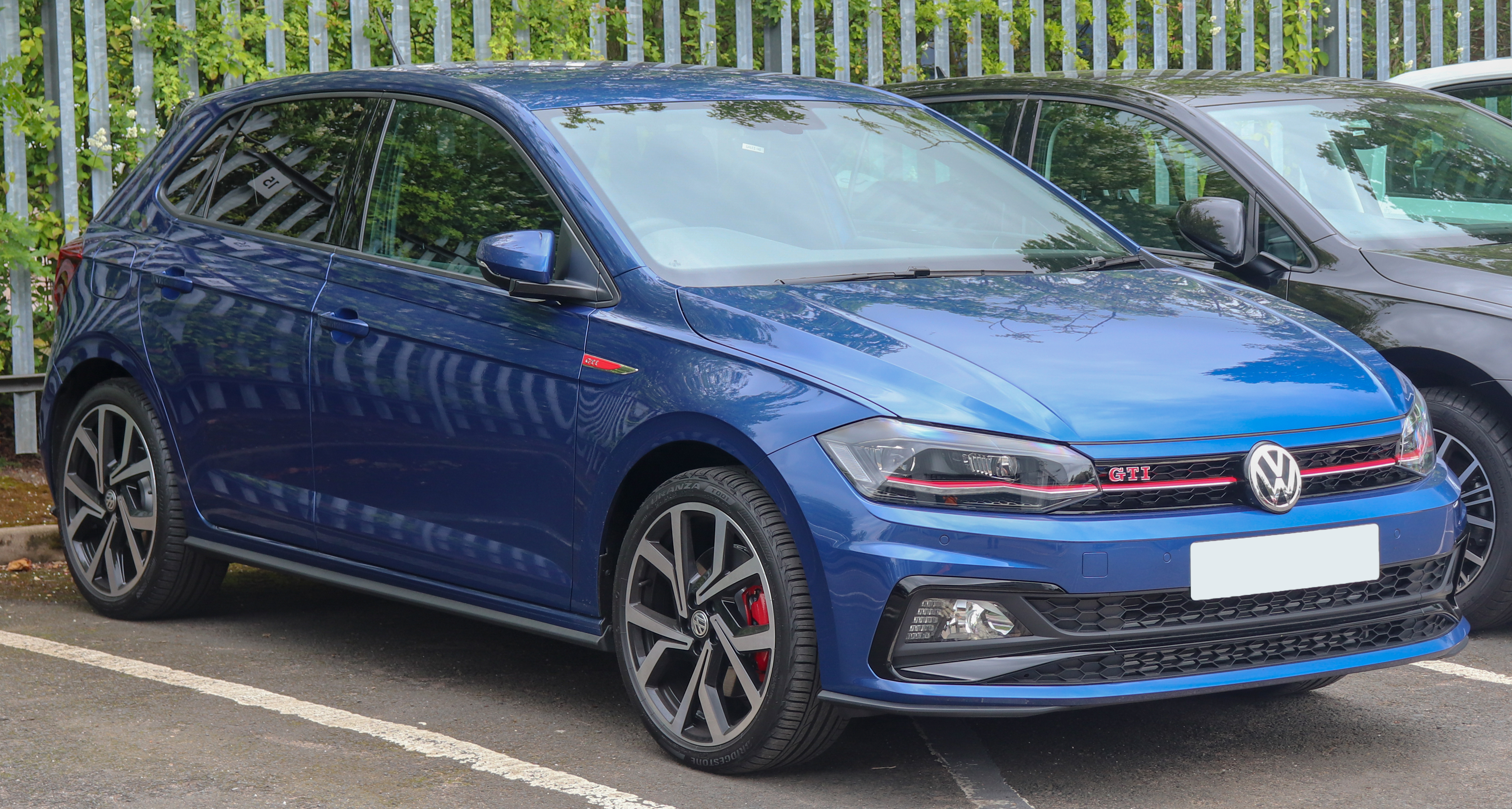
Front view

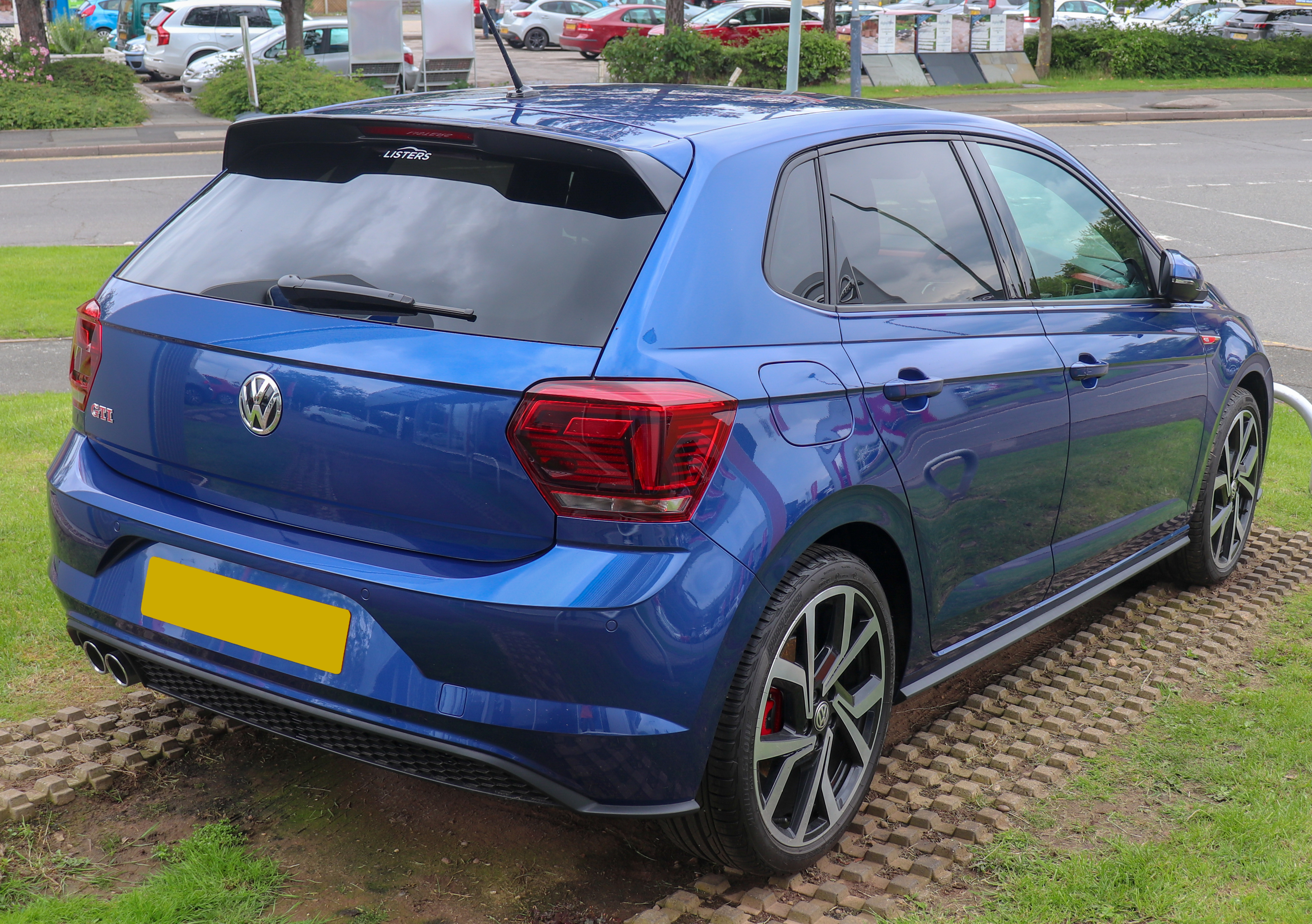
Rear view

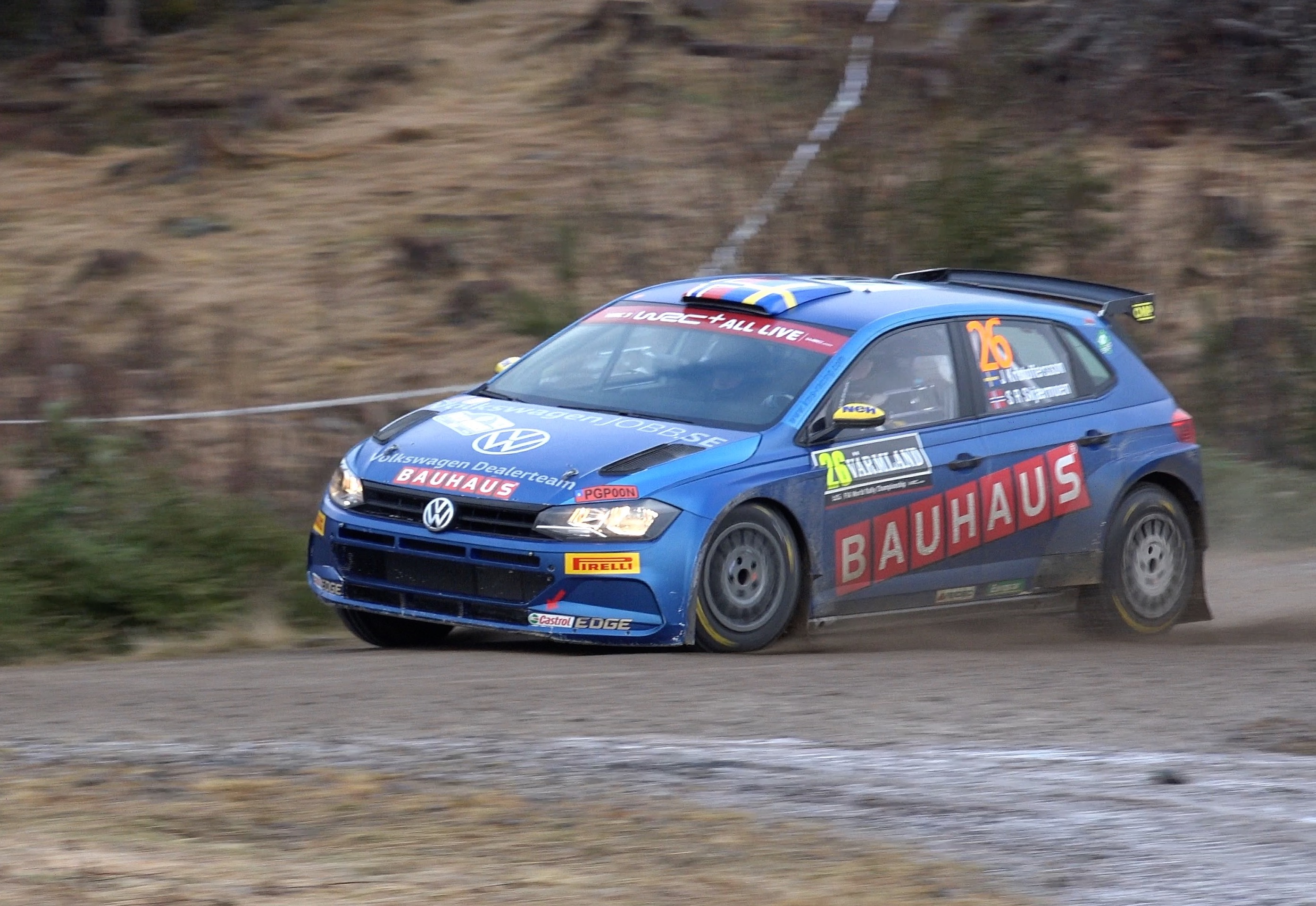
Mk6 Polo GTi R5 rally car

==== Facelift ====
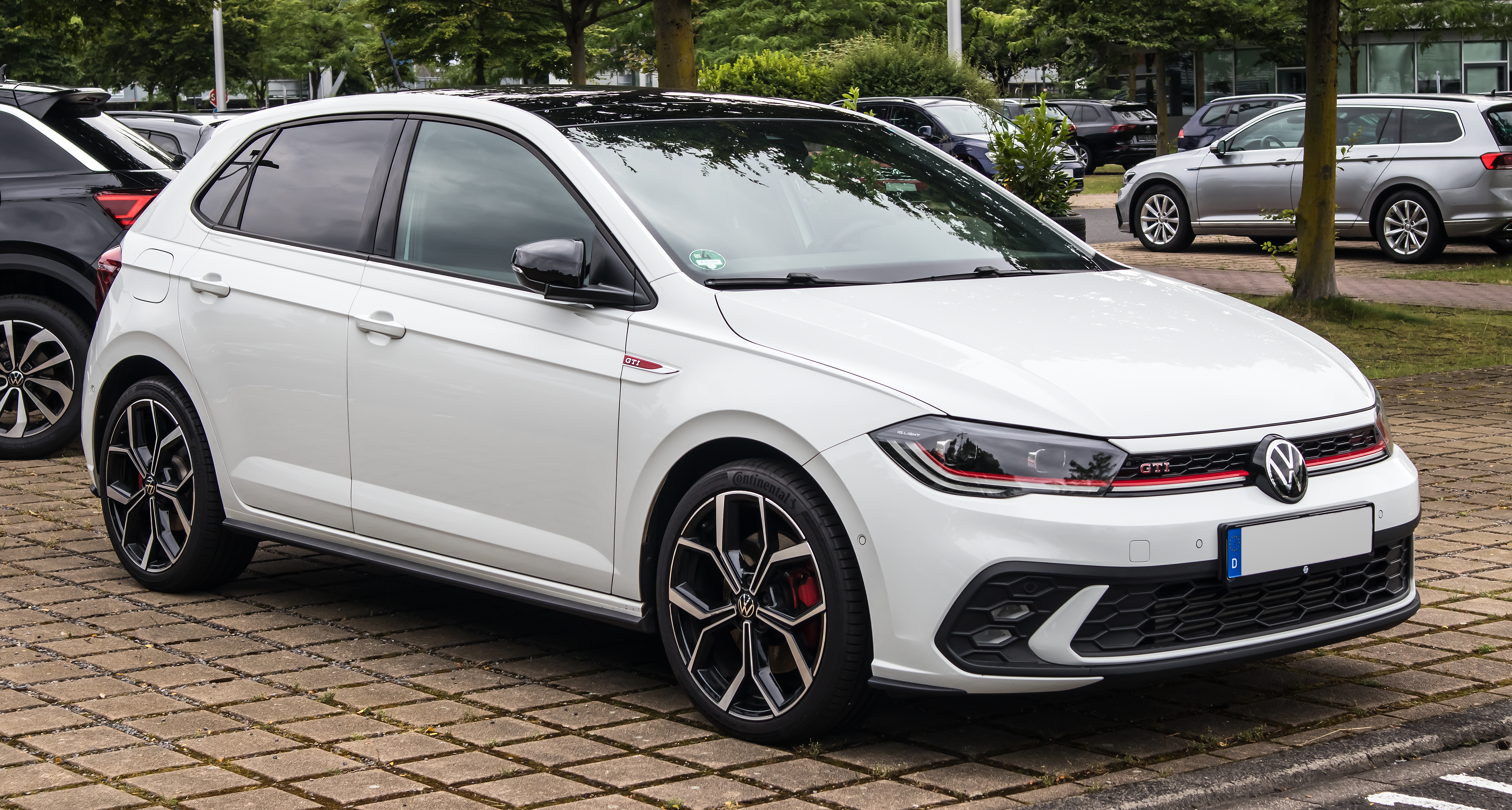
Front view

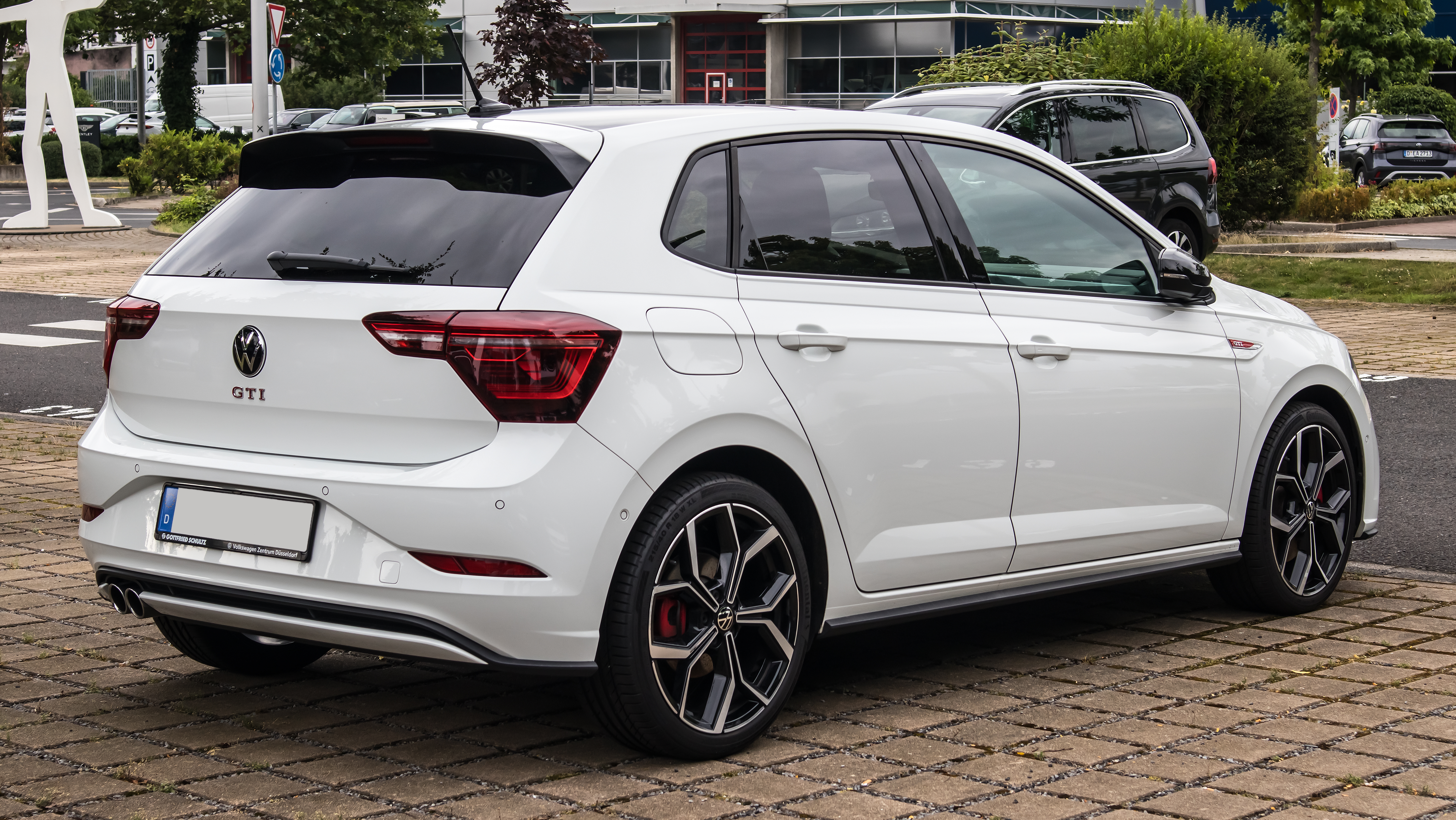
Rear view

== Performance versions and motorsport ==
Volkswagen helped consolidate the pre-eminence of the so-called hot hatch genre of high-performance hatchbacks with their Golf GTI in 1975 and has produced a number of performance versions of the Polo. The first of these was the Polo GT version of the Polo Mk1F.

The Polo Mk2 and Mk2F were available as supercharged G40 models. The GT G40 with its 1.3-litre 85 kW (114 hp) engine could reach 100 km/h (62 mph) in 8.1 seconds from standstill and had a maximum speed of 196 km/h (122 mph). It was used by Volkswagen to set a number of world endurance speed records, such as the 1.3-litre class records for speed over 24 hours and speed over a distance of 5,000 km (3,100 mi).

The fastest version of the Polo Mk3 on the United Kingdom market was the 1.6-litre, 16-V, 92 kW (123 hp) model. A 88 kW (118 hp) Polo GTI model was also produced, but only in a limited edition in Germany, and this was the first time the GTI label had been used for a Polo. A GTI version of the Polo Mk3F, with a 92 kW (123 hp) 1.6-litre petrol engine was also produced.

In 2004, Volkswagen Individual, a specialist division of Volkswagen, produced a limited number of (Polo Mk4) Club Sports with a 1.8-litre, turbocharged engine producing 132 kW (177 hp). Available only in Germany, this was based on the one-make racing series Polo Cup Racer hatchback. The Club Sport came with a roll cage inside the vehicle and Recaro racing seats as standard.

A GTI version of the Polo Mk4F was launched in 2006. These feature styling similar to that of the contemporary Golf GTI and a turbocharged 20-V, 110 kW (150 hp), 1.8-litre petrol engine. It has a 0–100 km/h time of 8.2 seconds and a top speed of 216 km/h (134 mph).

Volkswagen Individual have also engineered an even faster Polo called the Polo GTI Cup Edition. Available with the same 1.8-litre, turbocharged engine, albeit with 130 kW (180 hp), its claimed 0–100 km/h is 7.5 seconds, and it has a claimed top speed of 225 km/h (140 mph).

Volkswagen Racing in South Africa rallied a four-wheel drive Polo Mk4F that shared some components with its sister World Rally Championship Škoda Fabia; the S2000 has a 2.0-litre, 191 kW (256 hp) engine. Mk4 Polos have been entered into the Junior World Rally Championship. The Polo also competed in the Russian Touring Car Championship.

A number of one-make race series were made of the Polo, starting with the G40 Cup for Polo Mk2 and Mk2F G40 versions. The current Polo Cup championship for 78 kW (105 hp) cars is a support race at rounds of the Deutsche Tourenwagen Masters.

Sébastien Ogier won the FIA World Rally Championship for Drivers in 2013, 2014, 2015 and 2016 driving a Volkswagen Polo R WRC.

== Sales ==
The sales of Volkswagen Polo set a benchmark for Volkswagen, which sold more than 12 million cars globally so far; in February 2010 Volkswagen produced the 11,111,111th Polo worldwide at the celebration event of its first production anniversary in Pune, India. In 2010, its first full year on sale in the United Kingdom, more than 45,000 units were sold. It was the UK's sixth-best selling new car.

11 years later, in 2021, the Polo has maintained consistent sales figures with it being the fifth best-selling car in the UK in 2021 having had 30,634 new registrations throughout the year.

In South Africa, the previous model year's Polo is produced as well, and branded as the Polo Vivo.

Volkswagen Polo remains one of Volkswagen’s key global models with notable developments and sustained demand in several markets in 2024 and early 2025. In 2024, Volkswagen produced approximately 472,000 Polo units globally, indicating a recovery from the pandemic-related downturns of previous years. Over its lifetime, the Polo has sold more than 13 million units worldwide, maintaining steady interest especially in Europe. Volkswagen has emphasized mild-hybrid technology and compliance with stricter emissions regulations to keep Polo competitive and sustainable in key European markets. The discontinuation of higher emission variants like the GTI in some markets is part of this pivot.

Year	Global (production)	Europe	Brazil	China	Polo Classic/Saloon
1997		456,363			
1998		426,341			
1999		351,666			
2000	376,164	364,402			56,670
2001	328,542	335,862			32,598
2002	523,512	357,146	23,038		24,702
2003	422,003	344,169	30,193		84,272
2004	334,143	306,935	24,807		100,331
2005	352,120	288,274	20,828		59,623
2006	401,551	295,176	28,924		67,237
2007	449,602	289,388	50,955		86,861
2008	408,679	276,098	42,626		62,167
2009	453,824	289,279	32,002		16,764
2010	635,555	360,937	29,654		16,692
2011	809,549	356,355	21,394		12,850
2012	711,519	286,167	24,002		15,265
2013	725,291	264,763	12,971		
2014	753,754	279,463	8,862		
2015	754,546	301,462	2,872		
2016	794,388	307,462			
2017		271,369	9,521		
2018		295,403	69,584		
2019		257,804	72,057		
2020		169,467	41,836		
2021		154,066	19,196		
2022		113,588	8,193		
2023			111,247	36,453	
2024	472,000		140,154	15,437	
2025			122,677	2,263	
