= Sleeper (car) =

High performance car with an unassuming exterior

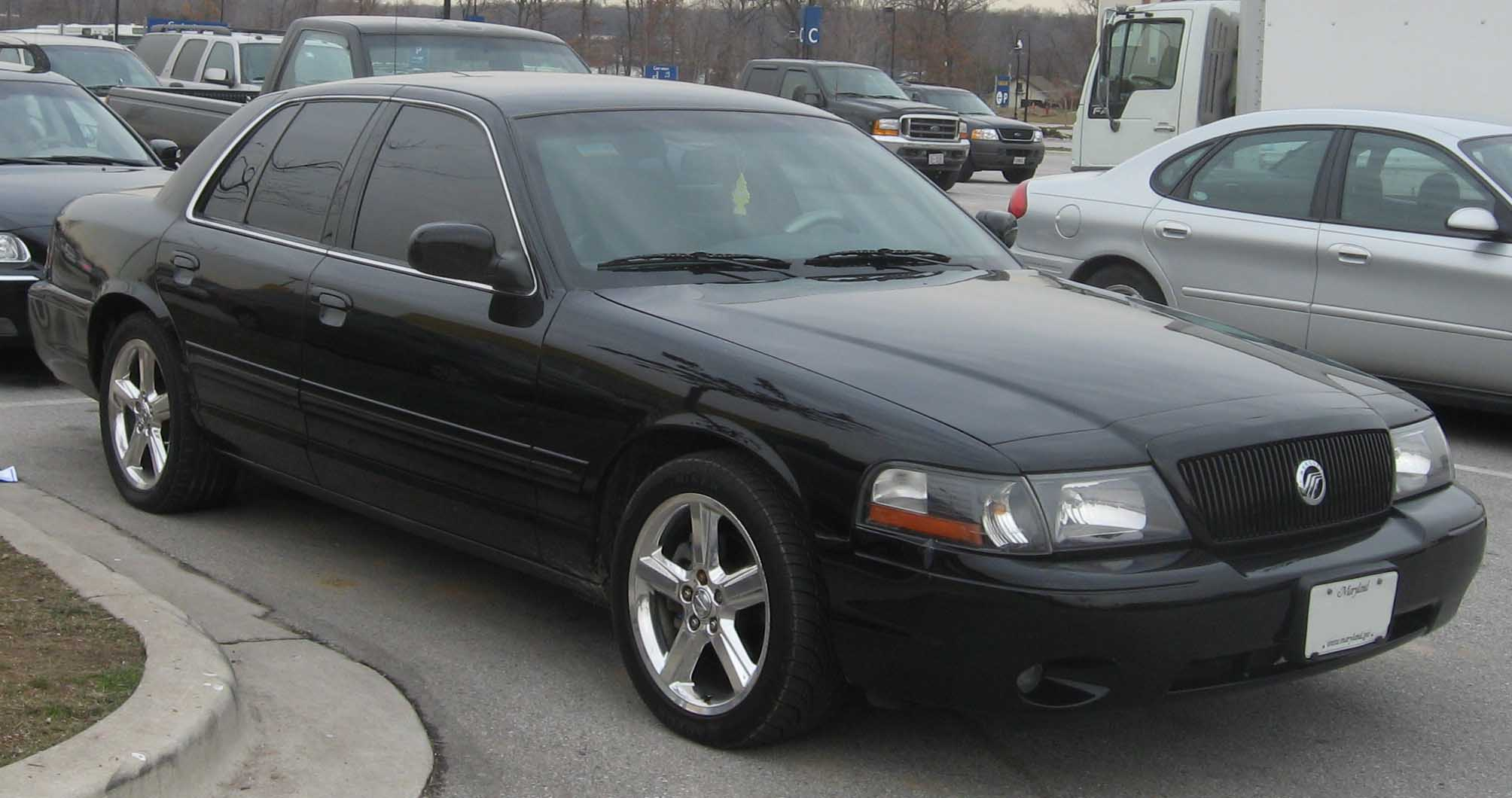
A third-generation Mercury Marauder, the high-performance version of the Mercury Grand Marquis full-size sedan

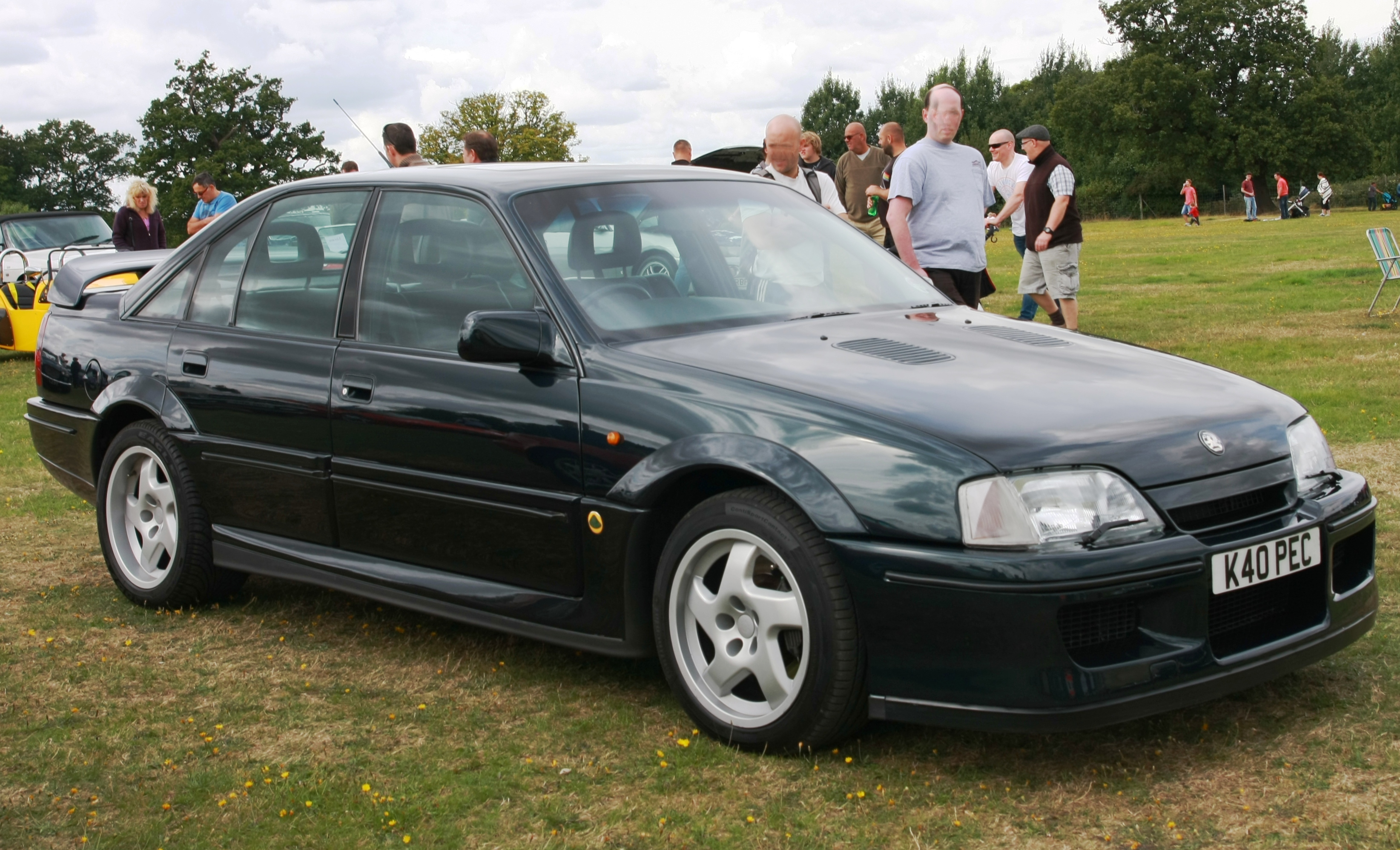
The Lotus Carlton, a high-performance version of the Vauxhall Carlton/Opel Omega A executive car

A sleeper (American English) or Q-car (British English) is a car that has high performance while having an unassuming exterior. Sleepers are usually developed on the platform of a non-athletic class of vehicle, most often that of an economy car. The American name for this type of vehicle comes from the term sleeper agent, whereas the British name is derived from the Q-ships used by the Royal Navy.

The British term has been in use since the aftermath of World War II. In the February 1963 issue of Motor Sport magazine, British journalist Bill Boddy states: "the modifications carried out by Lotus have turned the Lotus Cortina into a 'Q' car par excellence" in a highlight of the high-performance Cortina's unassuming exterior. Likewise, in the 1956 British film The Long Arm (known as The Third Key in the United States), the term is used in reference to unmarked police cars patrolling the city of London by night, indicating that it was in use among British law enforcement at least a decade earlier.

In July 1964, British magazine Motorcycle Mechanics carried an announcement from editor Bill Lawless of the use of two unmarked police "Q-cars" — a black Daimler SP250 and a green Austin A40 Farina — patrolling the A20, a road between London and Maidstone.

In addition to looking modest, an aftermarket sleeper car may sometimes appear to be a "beater" — a car that is in a visibly poor condition due to seeming neglect and lack of maintenance on the owner's part — though this is intentional and commonly described as "all go and no show"; these cars are internally modified to achieve competitive levels of performance while being presented as a standard or neglected car.

== History ==
=== United States ===
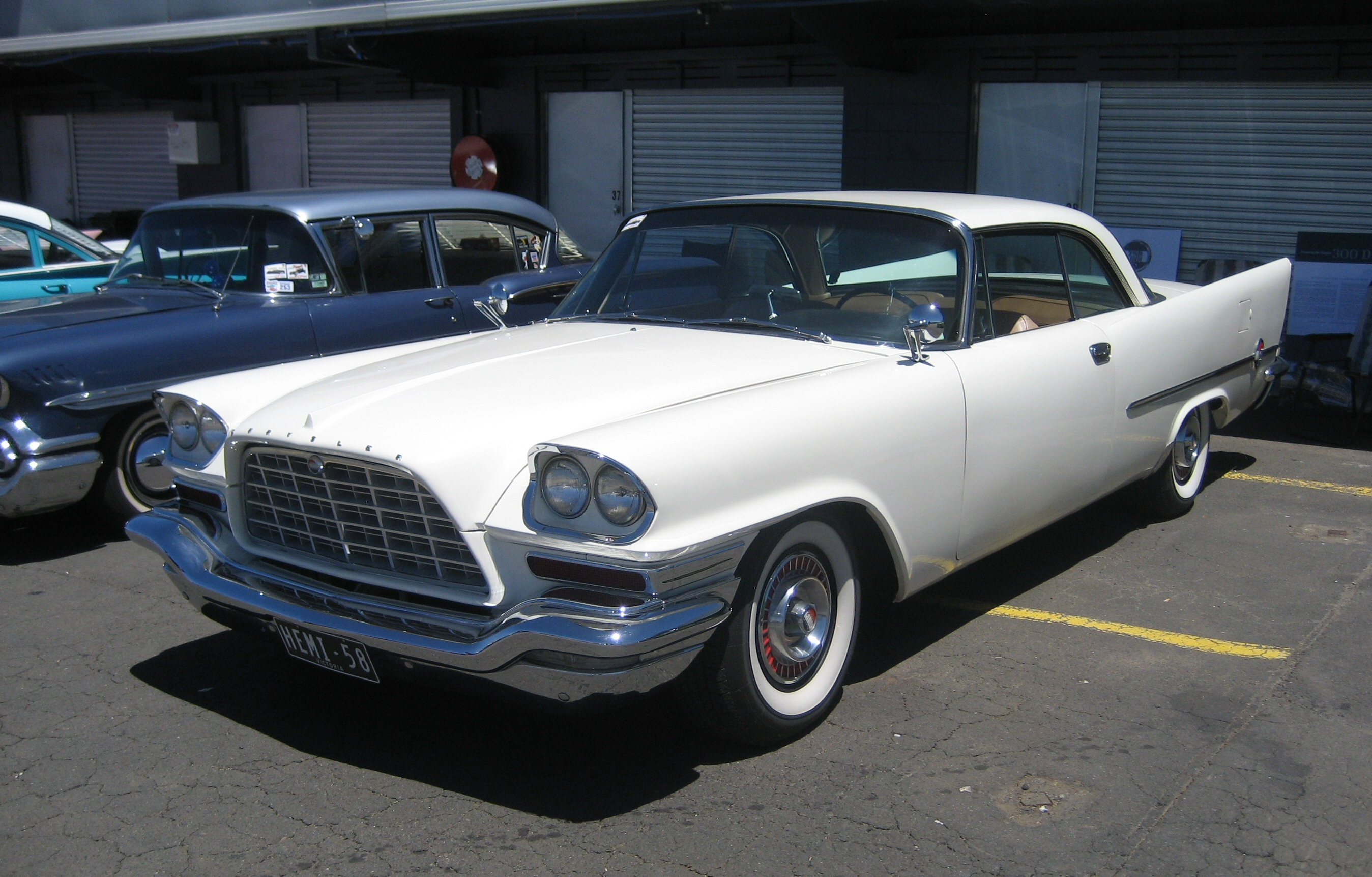
1958 Chrysler 300D with the 380 hp (280 kW) FirePower Hemi engine

The Chrysler 300 letter series began in 1955 with the Chrysler C-300. With a 331 in^{3} (5.4 L) FirePower V8, the engine was the first in a production passenger car to be rated at 300 hp (220 kW), and was by a comfortable margin the most powerful in American cars of the time. By 1957, with the 300C, power was up to 375 hp (280 kW). These cars were among the first sleepers, marketed as high-end luxury cars from the traditional luxury marque Chrysler, but with a high-end homologation racing engine. However, these cars lose their "sleeper value" due to both their rarity (this series was made in limited numbers and examples are very expensive), and the well publicized successes of Carl Kiekhaefer in NASCAR racing (1955–1956); though the model is an important precursor of the muscle car.

The Ford Taurus SHO (Super High Output) was introduced in 1989 as a high-performance version of the standard Taurus, which it differed on the exterior slightly by having a Mercury Sable hood, different bumpers, side cladding, and fog lamps. The SHO has a Yamaha-built V-6 engine that redlined at 7,000 rpm and produced 220 hp (160 kW), only 5 hp less than the 4.9 L V8 of the Ford Mustang at the time, with over double the horsepower of the Taurus base model's 90 hp (67 kW) 2.5-liter HSC four-cylinder. With only subtle cosmetic differences, but power competitive with sports cars of the era such as the Pontiac Fiero and Toyota MR2, the Taurus SHO became a defining sleeper car of the 1990s.

The third-generation Mercury Marauder was a high-performance variant of the full-size Grand Marquis using the Ford Panther platform. It visually differed from its Grand Marquis sister model by its monochromatic appearance, with most Marauders sold in black, and the only chrome being its window trim, wheels, and Mercury emblems on the grille and trunk lid, as well as slightly different fascia styling, exhaust tips, and headlights. The Marauder featured a 302 hp (225 kW) 4.6 L DOHC V8 mated to a 4-speed 4R70W automatic; an evolution of the Lincoln Mark VIII engine.

=== Europe ===
The 1968 Mercedes-Benz 300SEL 6.3 was a powerful sedan with a subdued exterior. A trend of overtly powerful saloon cars with subtle body modifications is exemplified by the work of Mercedes-AMG and Brabus on unassuming Mercedes saloons.

The 1986 Lancia Thema 8.32, which features an engine derived from Ferrari, has been described by Road & Track as "one of the weirder sleepers to come out of the 1980s". It used a 2,927 cc (2.9 L), Tipo F105L, Ferrari V8 producing 212 hp (158 kW). This engine was based on the unit used in the Ferrari 308 GTB and in the Ferrari Mondial Quattrovalvole, and some of the components were assembled by Ducati.

The 1990 Lotus Omega, based on the Opel Omega/Vauxhall Carlton, is often credited as a major figure of the production Q-car trend of the 1990's in Europe.

The 2001 Volkswagen Passat W8 features an unconventional but powerful W8 engine while having little distinctive styling features compared to the standard 4-cylinder powered versions.

The 1996 Volvo 850 and the succeeding 2003 Volvo V70R packaged a powerful 5-cylinder engine in a family wagon body.

=== Soviet Union ===
The first Q-car was invented by the Soviet NKVD in 1938, when imported Ford flathead V8 engines were installed in GAZ-M1 cars. After WWII they were replaced by GAZ M-20G cars equipped with adapted powertrain from GAZ-12 ZIM and special-purpose equipment. Those, as well as their successors, were available either in black color (sometimes in GAI road police livery) for the security details of the KGB's 9th Directorate or in common colors for the surveillance teams of the 7th Directorate. After the M-20 was discontinued, 603 GAZ-23 cars were produced in 1962-1970, combining modified GAZ-21 body with slanted GAZ-13 engine and transmission, better brakes and KGB equipment. They were followed by similar GAZ-24 modifications: GAZ-24-24, -25, -34 and -35, over 2000 mostly produced during 1970s and 1980s. GAZ-31012 and 31013 based on the GAZ-3102 were only produced in black in very small numbers (~300) starting from 1985. In Post-Soviet Russia the practice was discontinued, with special services acquiring imported cars.

== Owner-modified cars ==
Some vehicle owners create sleepers by swapping more powerful engines, or making other performance modifications, like adding a supercharger or turbocharger, leaving the external appearance as it came from the factory. Sometimes hints of the car's true nature are visible: wider tires, a lower stance, part of the bumper cut to fit an intercooler, or a different engine tone or exhaust note. Gauges and instrumentation are often kept to a minimum. Some owners go as far as to use weight reduction techniques employed by other performance enthusiasts, removing items not fundamental to street racing, such as rear seats, trim, spare tire, air conditioner, power steering, or heater; bumpers and headlights may also be replaced with lighter items.
