= Wait =

Wait or WAIT may refer to:

== Music ==
- Wait (musician), British town pipers

=== Albums and EPs ===
- Wait (The Polyphonic Spree EP), by The Polyphonic Spree
- Wait (Emanuel Nice EP), a 2002 EP released by the band Emanuel Nice
- Wait (Steelheart album), or the title song
- Wait (Sons of Korah album), 2011
- Wait (Pardon Us album), 2019

=== Songs ===
- "Wait" (Beatles song), 1965
- "Wait" (Chantel Jeffries song), 2018
- "Wait" (Earshot song), 2004
- "Wait" (Huffamoose song), 1997
- "Wait" (Gyan song), 1989
- "Wait" (M83 song), 2012
- "Wait" (Maggie Reilly song), 1992
- "Wait" (Maroon 5 song), 2018
- "Wait" (Seven Mary song), 2001
- "Wait" (Wang Chung song), 1984
- "Wait" (White Lion song), 1987
- "Wait (The Whisper Song)", by Ying Yang Twins, 2005
- "Wait", by 6ix9ine from TattleTales, 2020
- "Wait", by The Afters from I Wish We All Could Win, 2005
- "Wait", by C418 from Minecraft – Volume Beta, 2013
- "Wait", by Chris Brown from Graffiti, 2009
- "Wait", by Danny Chan, 1985
- "Wait", by David Archuleta from The Other Side of Down, 2010
- "Wait", by DIIV from Oshin, 2012
- "Wait", by Doechii from Alligator Bites Never Heal, 2024
- "Wait", by Earth, Wind & Fire from I Am, 1979
- "Wait", by Everyday Sunday from Sleeper, 2001
- "Wait", by Kara from Rock U, 2008
- "Wait", by The Kills from Keep on Your Mean Side, 2003
- "Wait", by Knuckle Puck from Shapeshifter, 2017
- "Wait", by NF from Mansion, 2015
- "Wait", by Royce da 5'9" from Layers, 2016
- "Wait", by S.E.S. from Love, 1999
- "Wait", by Sarah McLachlan from Fumbling Towards Ecstasy, 1993
- "Wait", by Take That from Progress, 2010
- "Wait", by The J. Geils Band from The J. Geils Band, 1970
- "Wait!", by Kym Mazelle and Robert Howard from Crazy, 1989
- "WAIT!", by Kid Cudi from Speedin' Bullet 2 Heaven, 2015

== Computing ==
- Wait (command), computer shell command
- Wait (system call), operating system call

== Education ==
- Wait Chapel, building on the campus of Wake Forest University in the U.S. state of North Carolina
- Western Australian Institute of Technology (WAIT), former name of Curtin University of Technology

== Radio Stations ==
- WAIT (AM), a defunct radio station (850 AM) formerly licensed to serve Crystal Lake, Illinois, United States
- WCPT (AM), a radio station (820 AM) in Chicago, Illinois, which held the call sign WAIT from 1941 to 1986 and from 2005 to 2007
- WZSR, a radio station (105.5 FM) in Woodstock, Illinois, which held the call sign WAIT-FM from 1988 to 1991

== Other uses ==
- Wait (name)
- Wait, Kentucky, an unincorporated community in Wayne County
- Wait, the activity of a waiting staff in a restaurant

== See also ==
- The Wait (disambiguation)
- W8 (disambiguation)
- Waite (disambiguation)
- Waitt, a surname
- WAITS, a computer operating system
- Waiting (disambiguation)
