= W8 =

W8 or W-8 may be:

- W8, a postcode district in the W postcode area
- W8 engine, an eight-cylinder piston engine in a W configuration
- Cargojet, IATA airline designator
- Worms 3D, the eighth game in the Worms series
- Vector W8, a sports car produced by Vector Aeromotive
- London bus W8, a London bus route
- a specific size of I-beam
- Windows 8, an operating system
- W8 (loading gauge) on the British rail system
- W8 (tram), a class of electric trams modified by Yarra Trams from SW6, W6 and W7 trams.
- Form W-8, a series of IRS tax forms

== See also ==
- 8W (disambiguation)
- Wait
- Weight
