= William Wait =

William Wait may refer to:

- William Bell Wait (1839–1916), teacher for the New York Institute for the Education of the Blind
- William C. Wait (1860–1935), justice of the Massachusetts Supreme Judicial Court
- William H. Wait (1842–1902), American politician
- William Killigrew Wait (1826–1902), Bristol merchant and Conservative member of parliament for Gloucester

== See also ==
- Wait (name)
