= Waitt =

Waitt is a surname. Notable people with the surname include:

- Charlie Waitt (1853–1912), American baseball player
- Chris Waitt (born 1974), English filmmaker, musician and writer
- Maude C. Waitt (1875–1935), member of the Ohio Senate
- Mick Waitt (born 1960), English football coach who managed the New Zealand national team
- Richard Waitt (died 1732), Scottish painter
- Ted Waitt (born 1963), American billionaire, co-founder of Gateway, Inc

== See also ==
- Waitt Brick Block, historic block at 422-424 Main Street, Malden, Massachusetts
- Waitt Peaks, cluster of pointed peaks, mostly snow-covered, northwest of Schirmacher Massif in the east part of Palmer Land
- Waitt Radio Networks or Dial Global Local, national radio network based in Omaha, Nebraska
- Dewait
- The Wait (disambiguation)
- Wait (disambiguation)
