= You Gotta Wait =

You Gotta Wait may refer to:

- "You Gotta Wait", a song by the Godfathers from Alpha Beta Gamma Delta (2022)
- "You Gotta Wait", a song by Thenewno2 from You Are Here (2008)

== See also ==
- Wait (disambiguation)
