= Wait (name) =

== Wait meaning and variations ==
The word 'Wait," anciently spelled Wayghte or Wayte, is derived from the old high German wahten (to keep watch); it is common in the sense of guard or watchman to all the Teutonic languages, the German wacht, Dutch vaght, Swedish vakt and English watch. When used as a verb, its meaning is "to stay in expectation of"; as a noun, it denotes a minstrel watchmen.

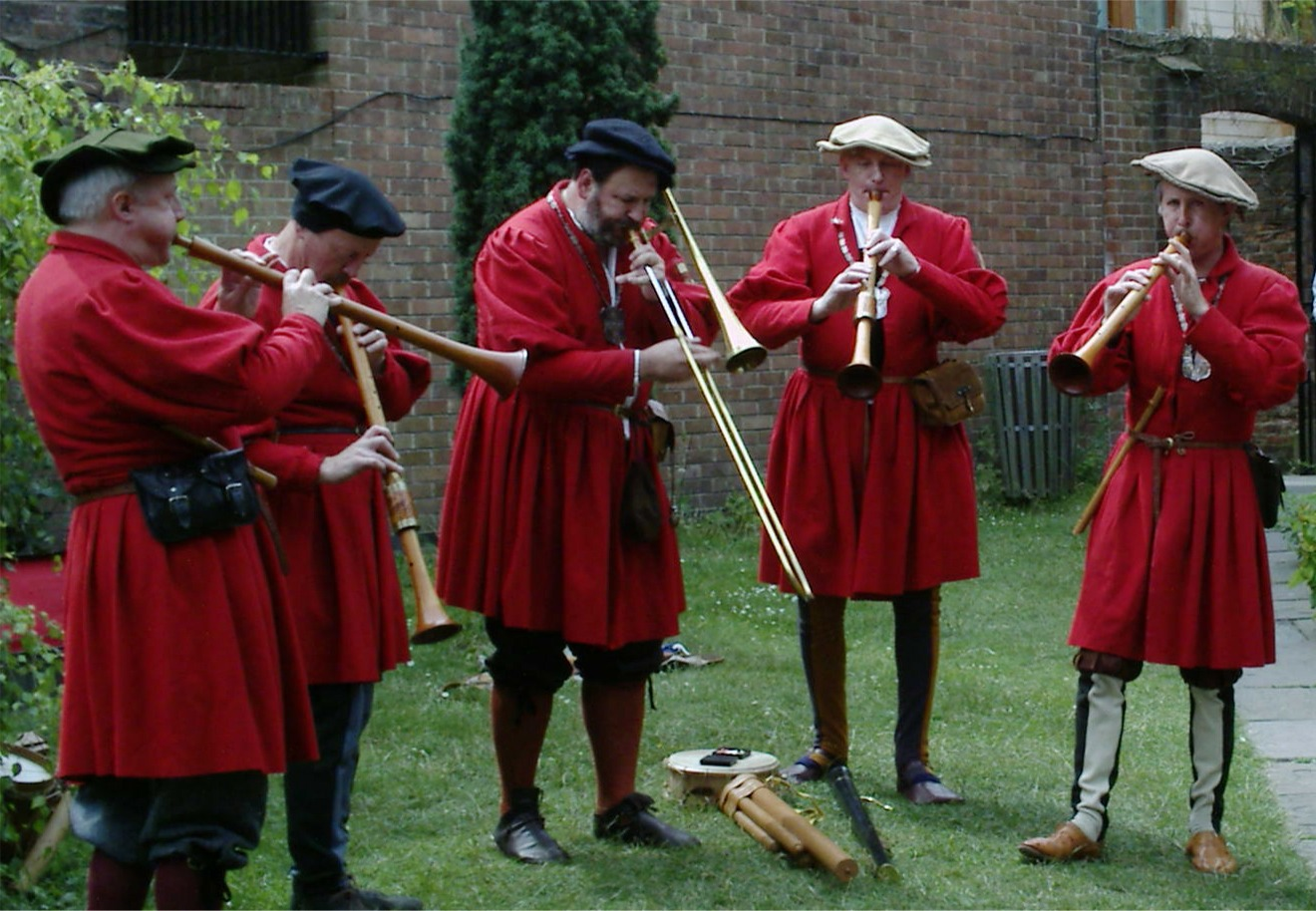
A Band of Modern Waits

When surnames were generally introduced into England in the eleventh century, those who held an office in most cases added its designation to their Christian names, thus: Richard, the minstrel-watchman, who was known as Richard le (the) Wayte, afterward contracted to Richard Wayte. The name has since been spelled Wayte, Wavt, Wayght, Waight, Wait, Waitt, Waite, Wate, Weight, Waiet, etc.

== Notable people include ==
=== Wait ===
- Benjamin Wait (1813–1895), Canadian businessman and author
- Charles R. Wait (1880–1973), American architect
- Daniel Guilford Wait (1789–1850), English clergyman, Hebrew scholar and religious writer
- Georgiana Claudie Wait, Indonesian actress
- Harry Wait (1891–1975), English footballer
- James R. Wait, Canadian electrical engineer and engineering physicist
- John T. Wait (1811–1899), U.S. Representative from Connecticut
- John Wait McGauvran (1827–1884), merchant and political figure in Quebec
- Norman Wait Harris (1846–1916), American banker
- Phoebe Jane Babcock Wait (1838–1904), American physician
- Ronald A. Wait (1944–2024), American politician in Illinois
- Samuel Wait (1789–1867), baptist minister and first president of Wake Forest University
- Wait Winthrop (1641–1717), colonial magistrate, military officer, and politician of New England
- William Bell Wait (1839–1916), teacher in the New York Institute for the Education of the Blind

=== Waitt ===
- Charlie Waitt (1853–1912), professional baseball player
- Chris Waitt (born 1974), independent filmmaker, musician and writer
- Maude C. Waitt, former member of the Ohio Senate
- Mick Waitt, association football coach who managed the New Zealand national football team
- Richard Waitt (died 1732), Scottish painter
- Ted Waitt (born 1963), American billionaire, co-founder of Gateway, Inc

=== Weight ===
- Carel Weight, a British artist
- Doug Weight, an American ice hockey player
- Greg Weight, an Australian photographer

=== Waite ===
- Arthur Edward Waite, occultist and co-creator of the Rider-Waite tarot deck
- Arthur Waite (racing driver), Australian racing driver
- Catharine Van Valkenburg Waite, United States author, lawyer and women's suffrage activist.
- David Waite, Australian rugby league coach
- Edgar Ravenswood Waite, Australian zoologist
- Harold Roy Waite (1884-1978), American aviator
- Jimmy Waite, ice hockey goaltender
- John Waite, British rock singer
- John Waite (cricketer), South African wicketkeeper–opening batsman
- John Musgrave Waite (1820-1884), Victorian fencing master
- Morrison Waite, U.S. Supreme Court Justice, 1874–1888
- Ralph Waite (1928–2014), American actor, best known for the role of John Walton on the TV series The Waltons
- Reginald Waite, Royal Air Force officer
- Terry Waite, British humanitarian and author
- Thomas Waite (regicide), English Member of Parliament and one of the regicides of King Charles I
- Thomas Waite (Under-Secretary for Ireland), 1747–1774
- Tommy Waite (born 1972), Northern Irish boxer of the 1990s and 2000s
- Waite Hoyt, American baseball player

=== Wayte ===
- Mary Wayte, former competition swimmer
- Anthony Wayte, the Archdeacon of Lewes from 1520 to 1527
- Billy Wayte, Canadian Football League, defensive back
- William Wayte, Church of England clergyman and a British chess master
- Wayte Raymond, a numismatist

== See also ==
- Waite (name)
- Waitt
- Weight (disambiguation)
