= 8W =

8W or 8-W may refer to:

== Units of measurement ==
- 8°W, or 8th meridian west, a longitude coordinate
- 8 watts, a derived unit of power
- 8 weeks
- 8 wins, abbreviated in a Win–loss record

== Transportation ==
=== Aviation ===
- 8W, ex-IATA code for BAX Global (defunct airline)
- 8W, IATA code for Fly All Ways
- Spartan 8W Zeus, a military aircraft
- B-8W, a model of Bensen B-8

=== Rail transport ===
- 8w (locomotive), a type of locomotive under the Whyte notation
- B40-8W, a model of GE Dash 8-40BW locomotive
- C40-8W, a model of GE Dash 8-40CW locomotive
- C44-8W, a model of GE Dash 8-44CW locomotive

== Other ==
- Tropical Depression 8W, part of the 1979 Pacific typhoon season

== See also ==
- W8 (disambiguation)
