= Volkswagen Passat (B5) =

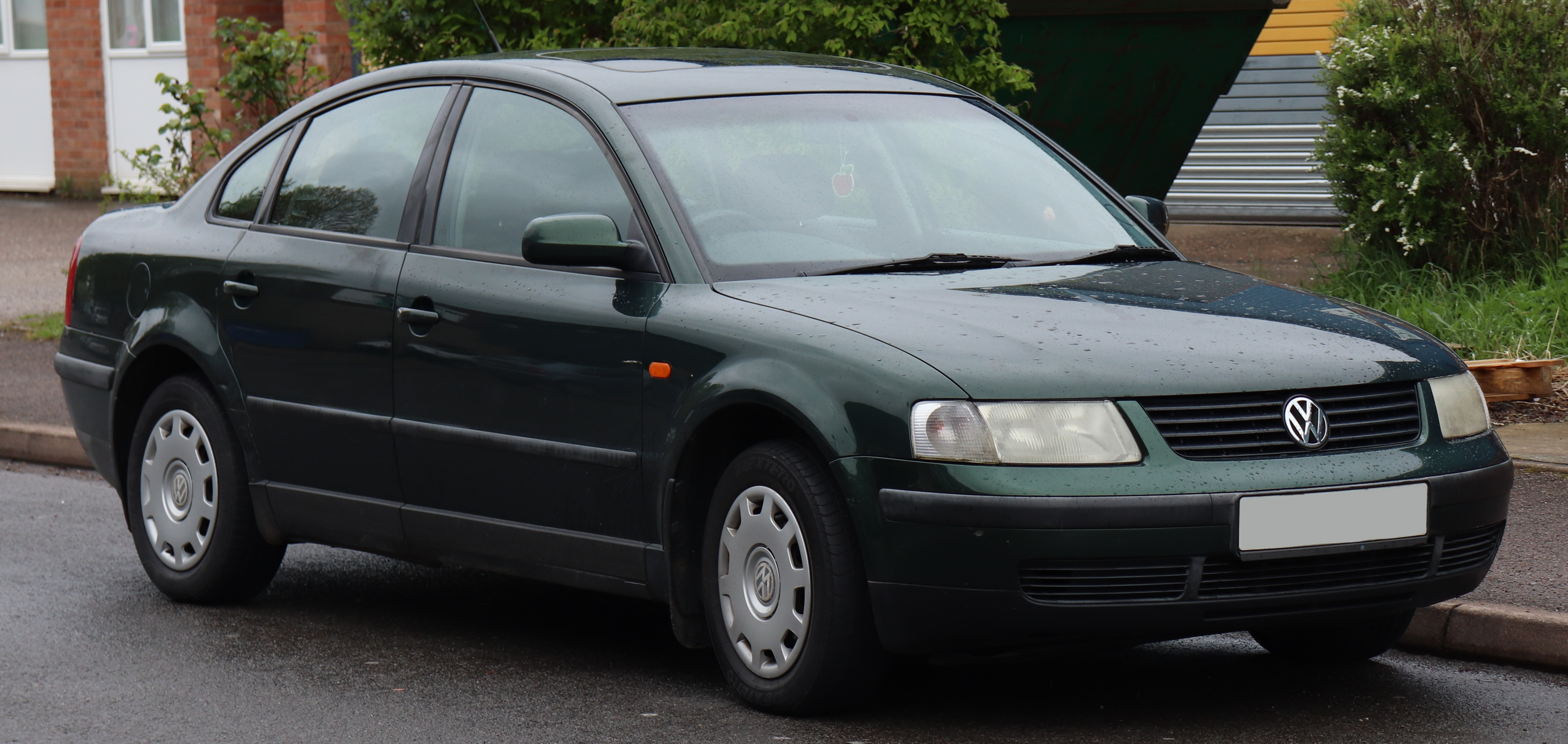

Overview
- Manufacturer: Volkswagen
- Production: 1996–2005; 1999–2005 (China)
- Assembly: Germany: Emden; Germany: Mosel/Zwickau; Poland: Poznań; Slovakia: Bratislava; Ukraine: Solomonovo (Eurocar); China: Anting (Shanghai Volkswagen); Thailand: Bangkok
- Designer: Hartmut Warkuss

Body and chassis
- Class: Mid-size car / Large family car (D)
- Body style: 4-door saloon/sedan 5-door estate/wagon
- Layout: Longitudinal Front engine, front-wheel drive or four-wheel drive
- Platform: Volkswagen Group B5
- Related: Audi A4; Volkswagen Passat Lingyu; Škoda Superb

Powertrain
- Engine: Petrol engines: 1.6 L EA827 I4; 1.8 L EA113 I4; 1.8 L EA113 I4; 1.8 L EA113 turbo I4; 2.0 L EA827 I4; 2.0 L ALT 20v I4; 2.3 L AGZ/AZX 20v VR5; 2.8 L ACK/AGE/AHA/ALG/AMX/APR/AQD/ATQ/ATX/BBG 30v V6; 4.0 L BDN 32v W8; Diesel engines: 1.9 L AHU/AHH TDI PD I4; 1.9 L AFN/AVB/AWX/AVF/AJM/ATJ TDI I4; 2.0 L BGW/BHW TDI PD DPF I4; 2.5 L AFB/AKN/BDG/BDH/BAU TDI V6
- Transmission: 4-speed automatic 5-speed manual 5-speed ZF 5HP19 Tiptronic automatic 6-speed manual

Dimensions
- Wheelbase: 106.4 in (2,703 mm); 110.4 in (2,804 mm) (LWB)
- Length: 184.1 in (4,676 mm) (B5 saloon); 183.8 in (4,669 mm) (B5 estate); 185.2 in (4,704 mm) (B5.5 saloon); 184.3 in (4,681 mm) (B5.5 estate); 188.5 in (4,788 mm) (LWB)
- Width: 68.5 in (1,740 mm)
- Height: 57.5–57.6 in (1,460–1,463 mm) (saloon); 58.6–58.9 in (1,488–1,496 mm) (estate)
- Kerb weight: 1,365–1,830 kg (3,009–4,034 lb)

Chronology
- Predecessor: Volkswagen Passat (B4)
- Successor: Volkswagen Passat (B6); Volkswagen Passat NMS; Volkswagen Passat Lingyu (for China)

The Volkswagen Passat (B5) is a large family car which was produced by German manufacturer Volkswagen from 1996 to 2005, with 1996 to 2000 model years being B5 models and 2001 to 2005 model years being B5.5 models. The car, based on the Volkswagen Group B5 platform, was originally launched in Germany in 1996, before it was introduced in 1997 to North America and Europe, followed by Australia in 1998 and China in 1999. It was launched a year prior to the final model year of the Volkswagen Passat B4, which was phased out completely by 1997.

== Design ==
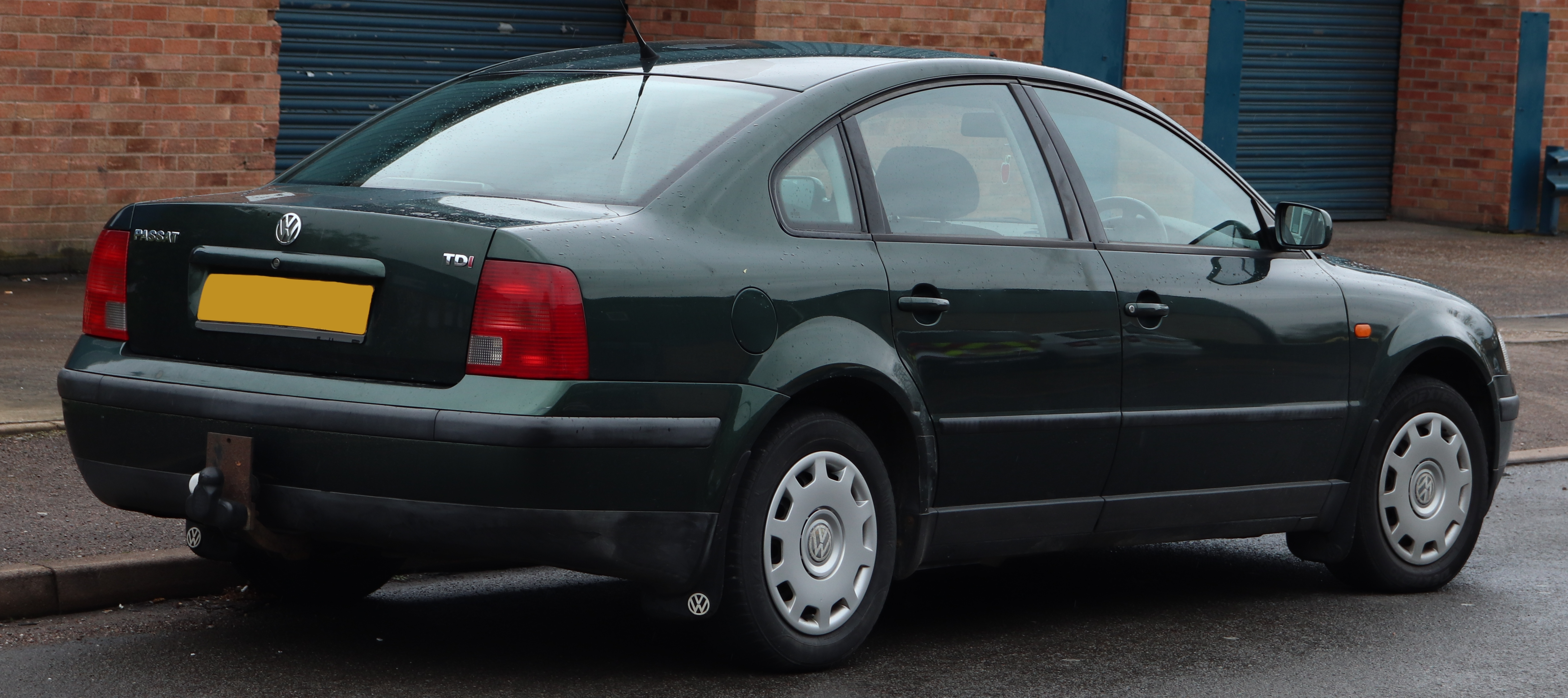
Sedan/Saloon (pre-facelift)

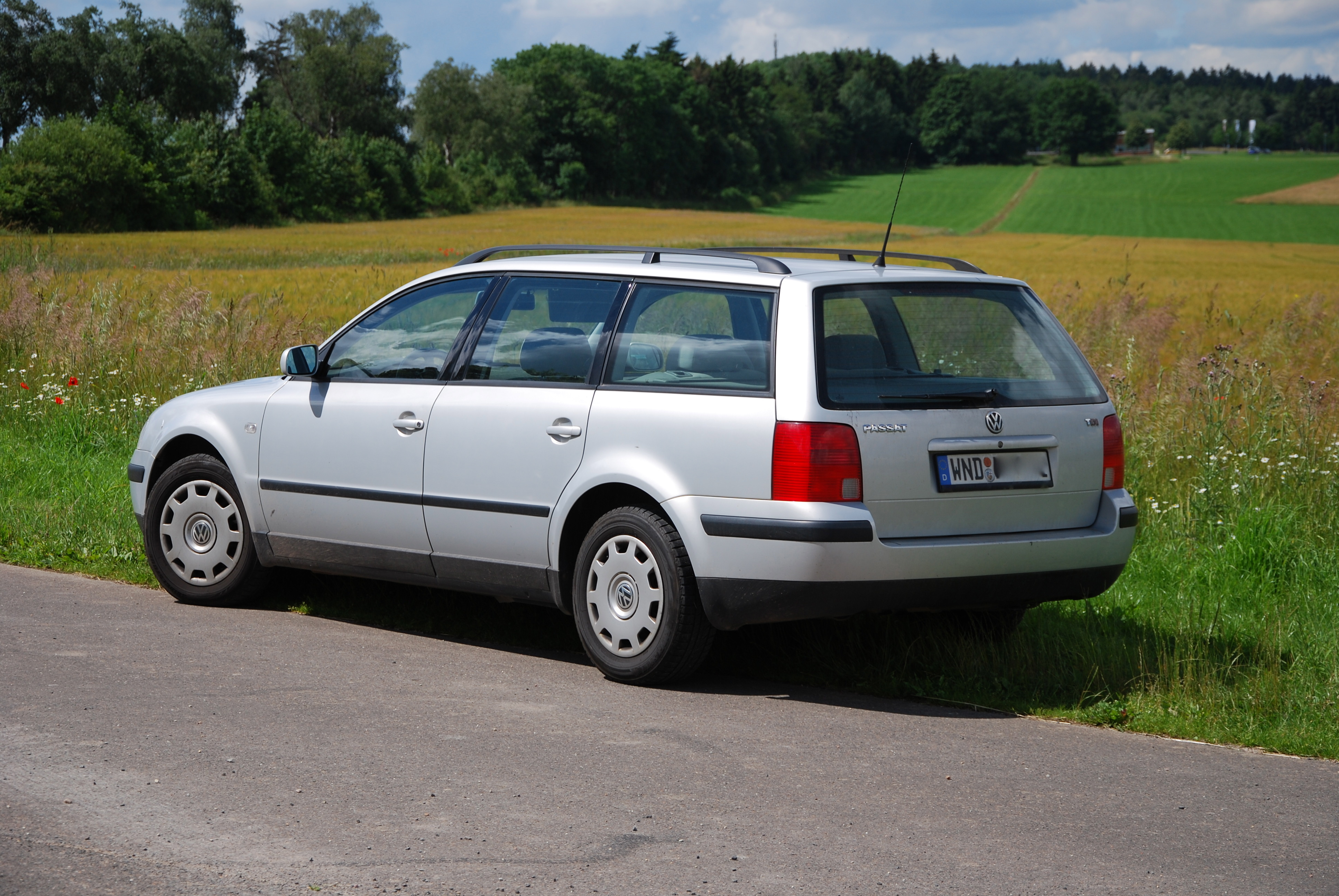
Variant/Estate/Wagon (pre-facelift)

The new Passat's raked windscreen and smooth underpinnings helped give the sedan a 0.27 coefficient of drag. The B5 Passat included higher-quality interior trim and the availability of luxury options to differentiate it in the marketplace, beginning a general push upmarket for Volkswagen across its entire model range which would be continued with the Golf Mk4 the following year.

The car featured fully independent four-link front suspension; and a semi-independent torsion beam for front-wheel-drive models or a fully independent suspension on the 4motion 4WD models. The 4WD version was introduced in 1997 as an option for the 1.8, 2.8 V6, 1.9 TDI, and 2.5 V6 TDI engines, using a second-generation Torsen T-2 based 4WD system to minimise loss of traction. The 1.8 L petrol engine in the Passat and Audi A4 has a lower oil capacity than transverse applications of the same engine (4.6 US quarts (4.4 L) in transverse, 4.3 US quarts (4.1 L) longitudinal). Three transmission options were available: a 5-speed manual, a 6-speed manual (codename 01E), and a 5-speed automatic transmission with tiptronic. There was also a 4-speed automatic transmission, available only in 66kW and 81kW 1.9 L TDI, as well as some gasoline models.

The B5 generation does not have individual fog lights. They are built into the headlight itself. There is a model with two front and two rear fog lights (from 1998), and there is a model without front fog lights, but has rear fog lights. The facelifted model included individual fog lights.

== B5 awards ==
- 1999 Used Car Buyer Greatest Used Buy Awards – Most Sensible Car Award Overall & Best Family Car
- 1999 Auto Express New Car Honours – Best Family Car
- 1998 What Car? Car of Cars – Best Medium Car
- 1998 Which? Best Buy – Large family car market winner

== 2001 Facelift (Passat B5.5) ==
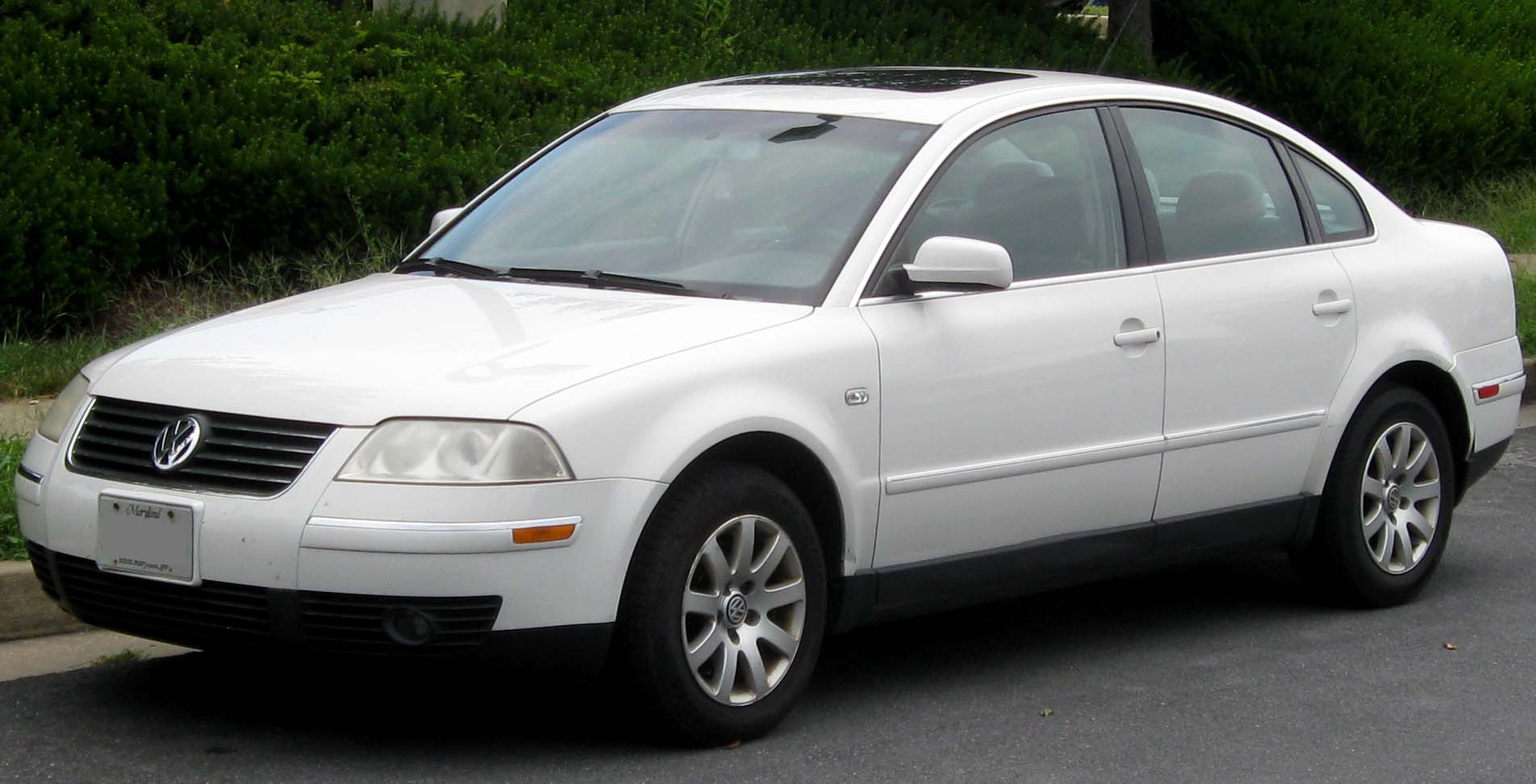

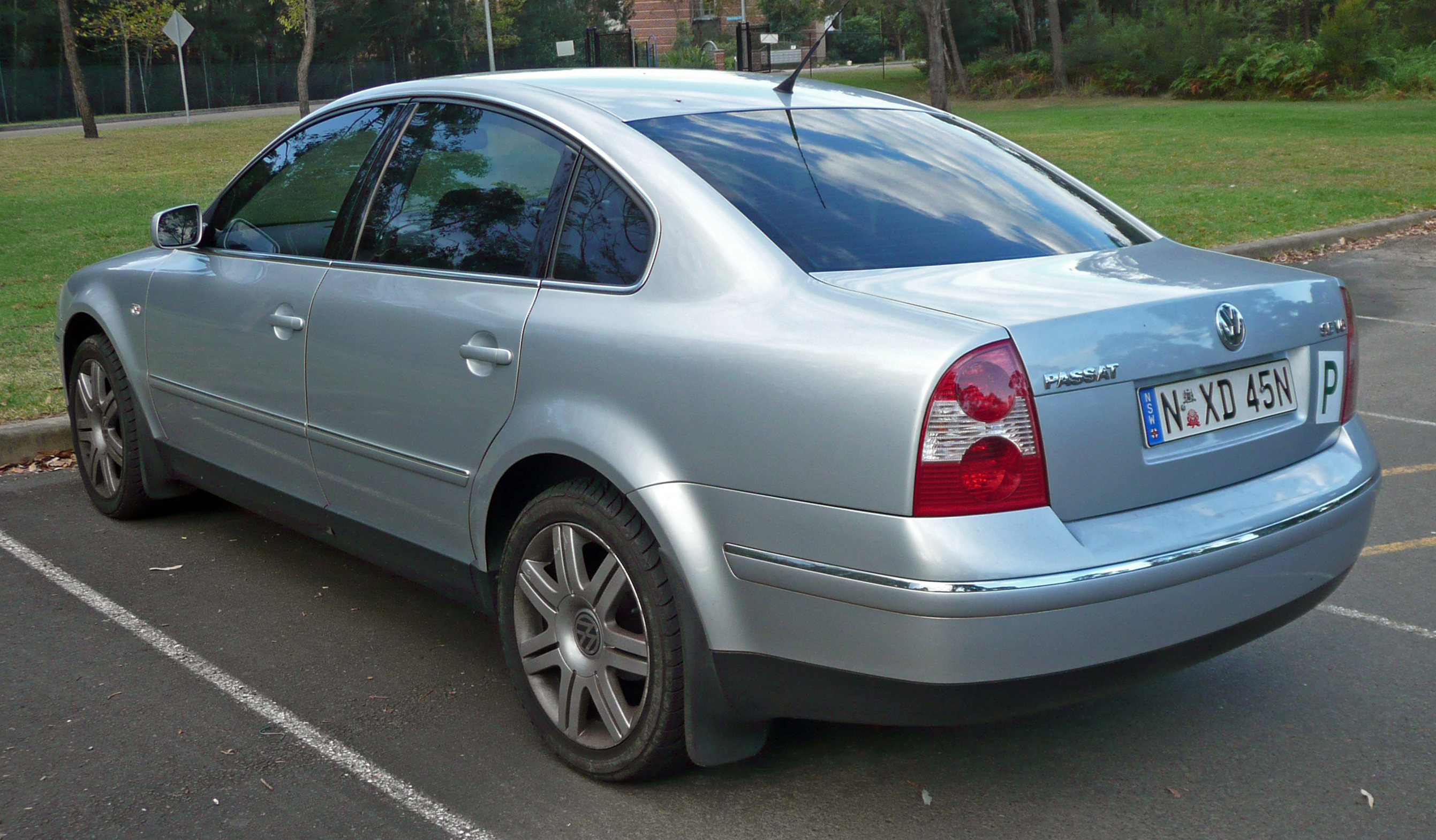
Sedan (facelift)

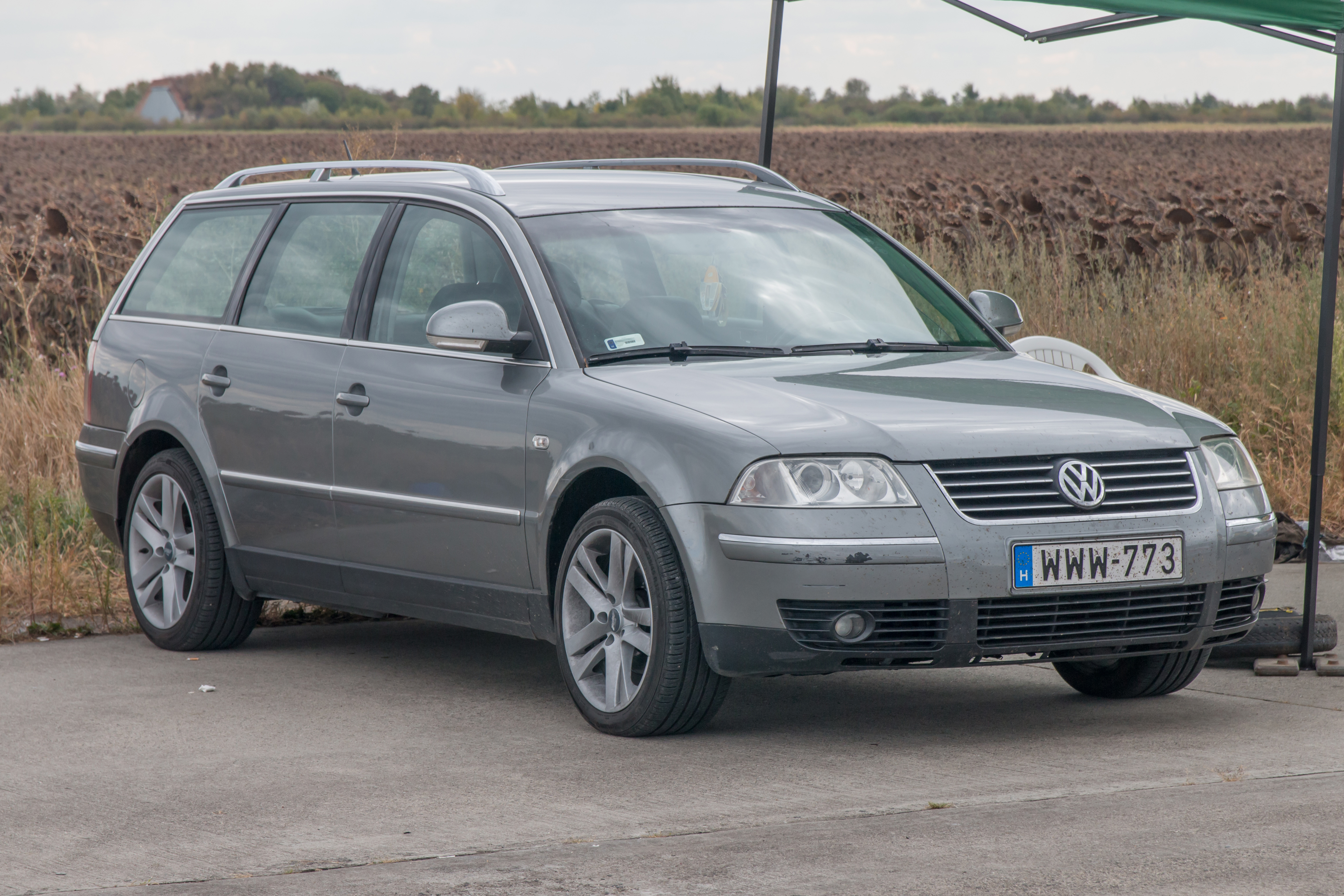
VW Passat 3BG Variant estate

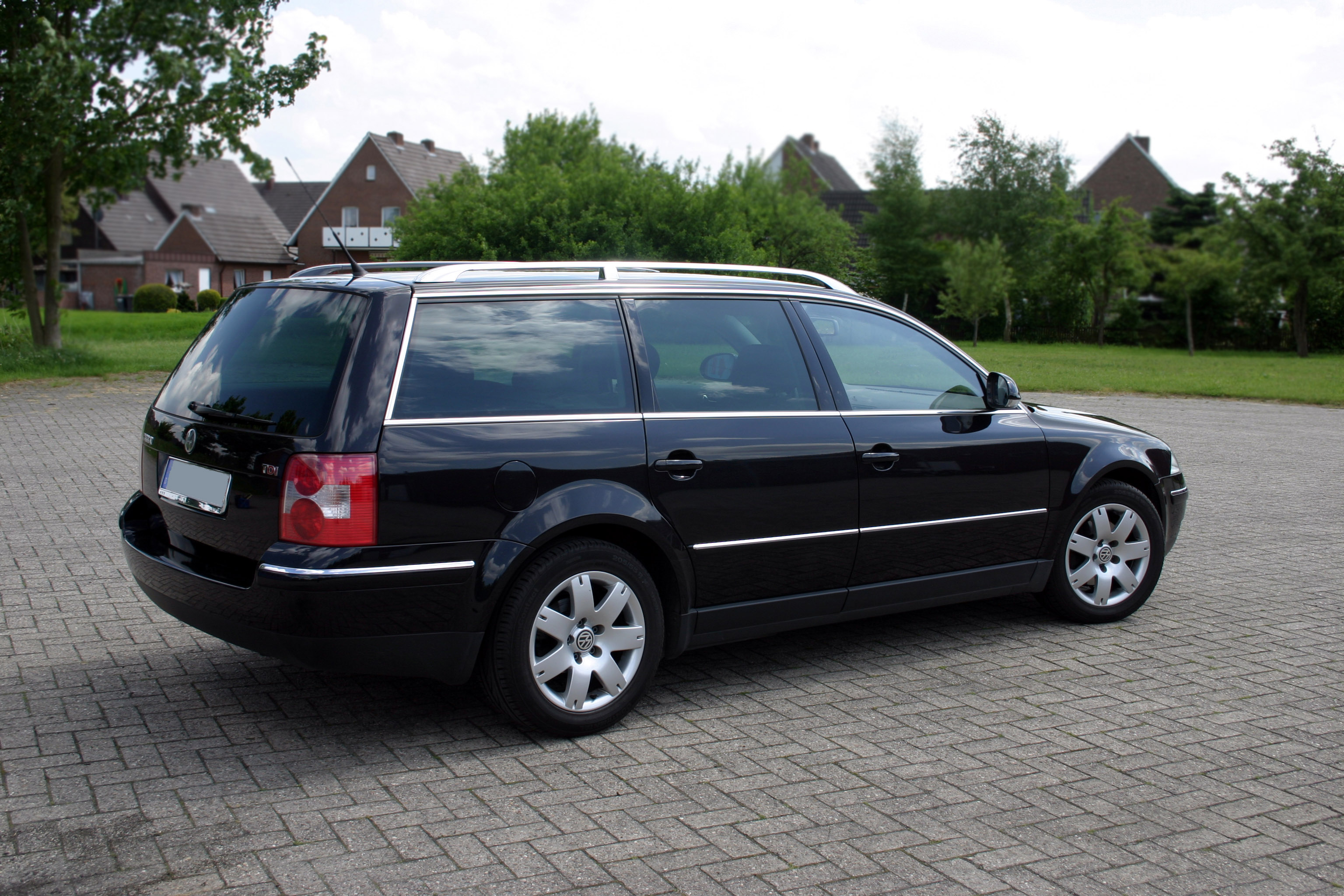
VW Passat 3BG Variant estate (rear view)

B5 Passat models built after late 2000, also known as B5.5 models for the 2001 model year onwards, received major styling and mechanical revisions including revised projector-optic headlights, bumpers, taillights, and chrome trim.

A 4.0 L W8 engine producing 275 PS (202 kW) was introduced with a luxury version that included standard 4motion all-wheel drive. This engine was intended to be a test bed for Volkswagen Group's new W engine technology, which would later make an appearance on the W12 in the Phaeton and Audi A8, and the W16 engine in the Bugatti Veyron.

In 2003, a 2.0 L Turbocharged Direct Injection (TDI) diesel engine producing 136 PS (100 kW) was added (making the Passat the only mid-sized diesel-powered car sold in the U.S.). This variant was available from 2003 until 2005.

=== LWB ===
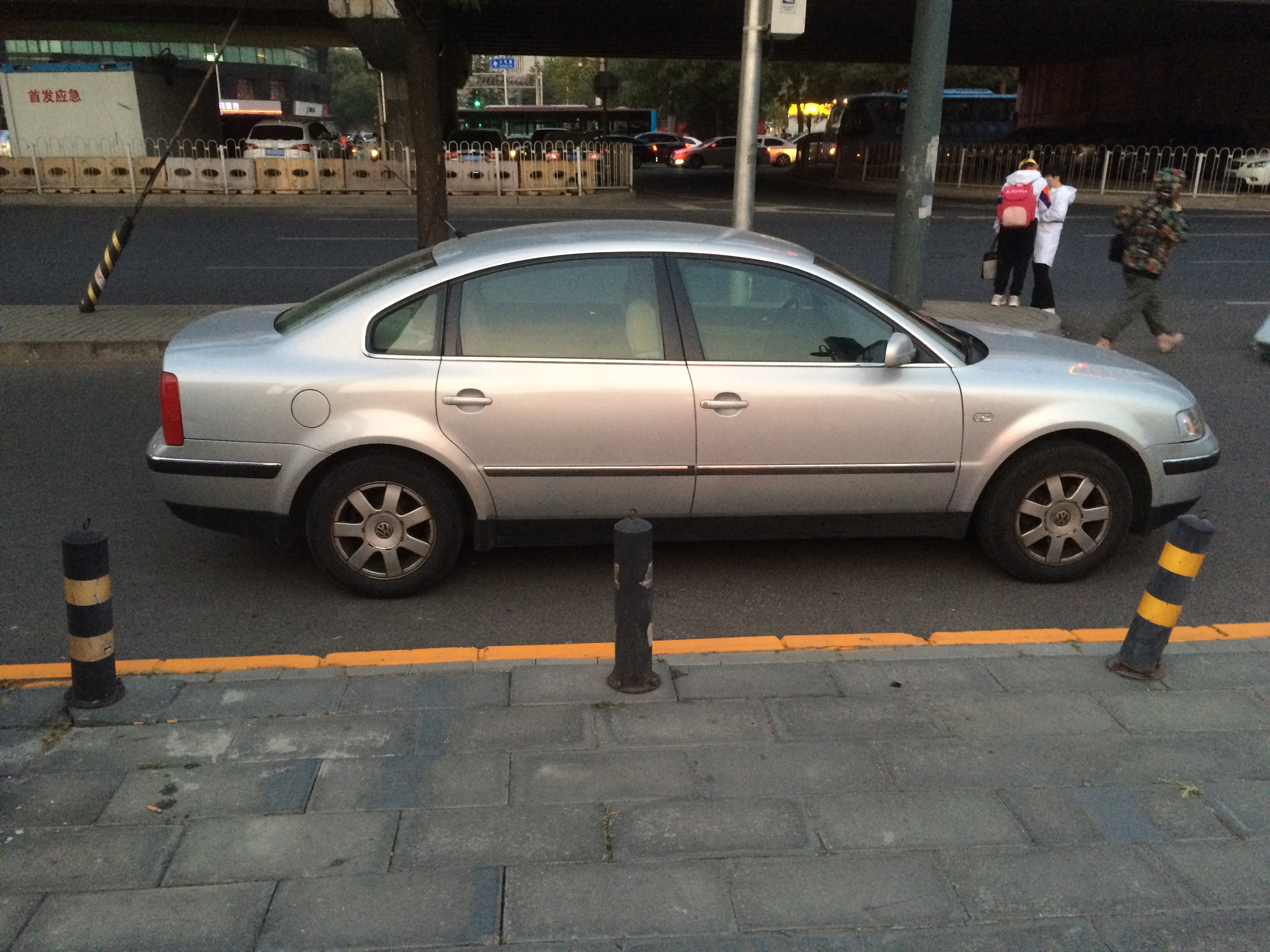
Passat B5 LWB

A lengthened platform went on to underpin the 'Passat' that was introduced in China in December 1999 by Shanghai-Volkswagen. This long-wheelbase version was rebadged and launched in Europe as the Škoda Superb in 2001. Both have a 100 mm (3.9 in) longer wheelbase and length than the standard B5 Passat. An updated version called the Passat Lingyu was released in late November 2005, which has the 1.8-litre turbocharged EA113, the 2.0 L EA113, and the 2.8 L BBG V6 petrol engines.

=== Gallery ===
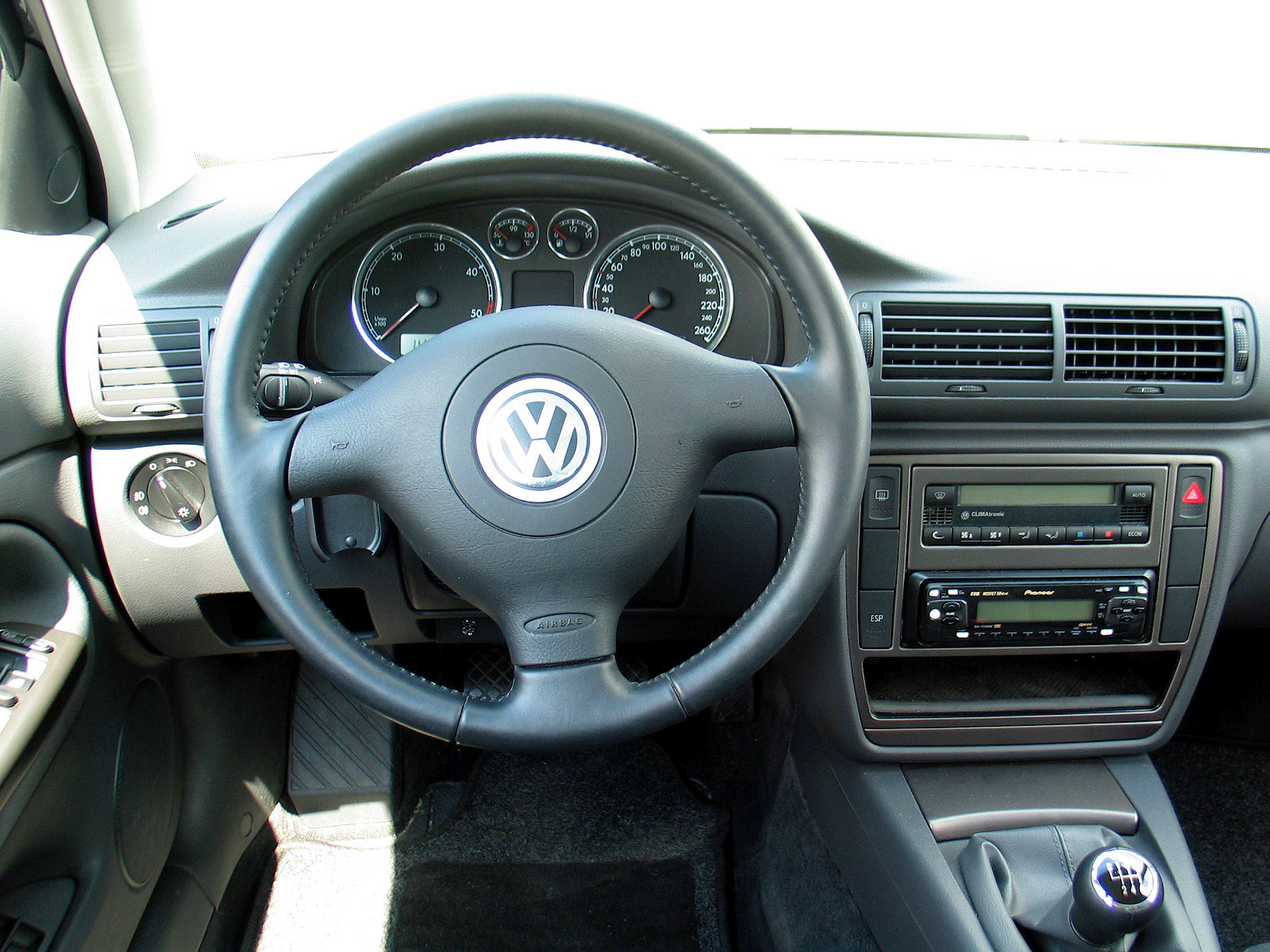
Interior (facelift)

=== B5.5 trim levels ===
In the United Kingdom, trim levels were E, S, Sport, SE, V5, V6, and Highline. The E trim level had a 1.6 L 102 PS (75 kW) engine only. The S trim level was considered well-equipped by the motoring press at the time, and What Car? magazine recommended the 1.8 S as the best version in 1999. SE models had the same engines as the S version, but were better equipped. The V5 models had a 2.3 V5 engine, the V6 was available with a 2.8 V6, or 180 PS (132 kW) 2.5 TDI.

Models sold in Europe and the Republic of Ireland were similar apart from the trim level naming schemes; the trim levels were Volkswagen's "lifestyle" naming scheme: Comfortline, Trendline, and Highline. A base model was also available.

Most models sold in the U.S. had the 1.8L 20-valve turbocharged four-cylinder engine or the 2.8L 30-valve V6 engine. Trim levels were GL (2003 onward), GLS, GLX, and W8 (2002–2004). The TDI diesel engine was introduced for the 2003 model year and was only available in GL and GLS trim levels with front-wheel-drive and the 5-speed automatic transmission. The W8 was only available with the 4motion all-wheel-drive system and a slightly higher trim than the GLX models. A 6-speed manual transmission was offered in the W8 from the 2003 model year as part of a sport package that also included a revised suspension and 17-inch BBS alloy wheels. The W8 was the only 4motion-equipped Passat in the U.S. that offered a manual transmission. The V6 engine had 4motion as an option, as did the 1.8 T starting in the 2004 model year. The GLX trim was only available with the V6.

Versions sold in Mexico are the same as their European equivalents.

=== B5.5 awards ===
- 2001 Auto Express Used Car Honours 2001 – Best Family Used Car
- 2001 Diesel Car 2001 Awards – Overall Diesel Car of the Year & Best Family Car
- 2000 Used Car Buyer: Used the Year – Overall winner & Best Family Car
- 2000 Auto Express Used Car Honours – Best Family Car
- 2000 Auto Express New Car Honours – Best Family Car
- 2000 Fleet World Honours – Best Fleet Car

== Engines ==
The internal combustion engines used are shared with many other vehicles in the Volkswagen Group.

B5 petrol engines
Short Descr	VW Engine Code	Engine Type	Displacement	Power (Max Output)	Torque (Max Output)	Years	Accel 0–100 km/h (sec.)	Top speed (km/h)	Transmission (manual)	Transmission (automatic)
1.6	ADP / AHL / ARM / ANA	I4 SOHC 8V, multi-point fuel injection	1595 cc	100 PS (74 kW; 99 hp) @5600 rpm	140 N⋅m (100 lb⋅ft) @3800 rpm	1996–2000	13.1	184	5-speed	4-speed
1.8	AFY	I4 DOHC 20V, multi-point fuel injection	1781 cc	116 PS (85 kW; 114 hp) @5800 rpm	164 N⋅m (121 lb⋅ft) @3500 rpm	1997–2000	12.1	199	5-speed	not produced
1.8	ADR / APT / ARG	I4 DOHC 20V, multi-point fuel injection	1781 cc	125 PS (92 kW; 123 hp) @5800 rpm	168 N⋅m (124 lb⋅ft) @3500 rpm	1996–1999	11.2	199	5-speed	4-speed
1.8 T	AEB / APU / ANB / ATW	I4 DOHC 20V, multi-point fuel injection and turbocharger	1781 cc	150 PS (110 kW; 148 hp) @5700 rpm	210 N⋅m (150 lb⋅ft) @1750–4600 rpm	1996–2000	9.1	214	5-speed	5-speed
2.0	AUZ / ASU / AVA	I4 SOHC 8V, multi-point fuel injection	1984 cc	120 PS (88 kW; 118 hp) @5600 rpm	175 N⋅m (129 lb⋅ft) @2600 rpm	1999–2000	11.3	196	5-speed	4-speed
2.3 VR5	AGZ	VR5 SOHC 10V, multi-point fuel injection	2324 cc	150 PS (110 kW; 148 hp) @6000 rpm	205 N⋅m (151 lb⋅ft) @3200 rpm	1997–2000	9.1	214	5-speed	5-speed
2.8 V6	ACK / AGE / AHA / ALG / ATX / APR / AQD	V6 DOHC 30V, multi-point fuel injection	2771 cc	186 PS (137 kW; 183 hp) – 193 PS (142 kW; 190 hp) @6000 rpm	280 N⋅m (210 lb⋅ft) – 300 N⋅m (220 lb⋅ft) @3200 rpm	1997–2000	7.5 – 8.7	232	5-speed	5-speed

B5 diesel engines
Short Descr	VW Engine Code	Engine Type	Displacement	Power (Max Output)	Torque (Max Output)	Years	Accel 0–100 km/h (sec.)	Top speed (km/h)	Transmission (manual)	Transmission (automatic)
1.9 TDI	AHU / AHH	I4 SOHC 8V, Turbocharged Direct Injection	1896 cc	90 PS (66 kW; 89 hp) @4000 rpm	210 N⋅m (150 lb⋅ft) @1900 rpm	1996–2000	13.8	183	5-speed	4-speed
1.9 TDI	AFN / AVG	I4 SOHC 8V, Turbocharged Direct Injection	1896 cc	110 PS (81 kW; 108 hp) @4150 rpm	235 N⋅m (173 lb⋅ft) @1900 rpm	1996–2000	11.5	189	5-speed	4-speed
1.9 TDI	AJM	I4 SOHC 8V, "Pumpe-Düse" (PD) unit injection	1896 cc	115 PS (85 kW; 113 hp) @4000 rpm	285 N⋅m (210 lb⋅ft) @1900 rpm	1998–2000	11.0	194	5-speed	5-speed
1.9 TDI	ATJ	I4 SOHC 8V, "Pumpe-Düse" (PD) unit injection	1896 cc	115 PS (85 kW; 113 hp) @4000 rpm	310 N⋅m (230 lb⋅ft) @1900 rpm	2000	11.0	194	6-speed	not mass produced - produced as custom order
2.5 TDI	AFB	V6 DOHC 24V, Turbocharged Direct Injection	2496 cc	150 PS (110 kW; 148 hp) @4000 rpm	310 N⋅m (230 lb⋅ft) @1500–3200 rpm	1998–2000	9.6	214	6-speed	5-speed

B5.5 petrol engines
Short Descr	VW Engine Code	Engine Type	Displacement	Power (Max Output)	Torque (Max Output)	Years	Accel 0–100 km/h (sec.)	Top speed (km/h)	Transmission (manual)	Transmission (automatic)
1.6	ALZ	I4 SOHC 8V, multi-point fuel injection	1595 cc	102 PS (75 kW; 101 hp) @5600 rpm	148 N⋅m (109 lb⋅ft) @3800 rpm	2000–2005	13.3	185	5-speed	5-speed
1.8 T	AWT	I4 DOHC 20V, multi-point fuel injection and turbocharger	1781 cc	150 PS (110 kW; 148 hp) @5700 rpm	210 N⋅m (150 lb⋅ft) @1750–4600 rpm	2000–2005	9.4	214	5-speed	5-speed
1.8 T	AWM	I4 DOHC 20V, multi-point fuel injection and turbocharger	1781 cc	170 PS (125 kW; 168 hp) @5900 rpm	225 N⋅m (166 lb⋅ft) @1950–5000 rpm	2000–2005	8.0	223	5-speed	5-speed
2.0	AZM	I4 SOHC 8V, multi-point fuel injection	1984 cc	115 PS (85 kW; 113 hp) @5400 rpm	172 N⋅m (127 lb⋅ft) @3500 rpm	2000–2005	11.5	194	5-speed	4-speed
2.0	ALT	I4 DOHC 20V, multi-point fuel injection	1984 cc	130 PS (96 kW; 128 hp) @5700 rpm	195 N⋅m (144 lb⋅ft) @3300 rpm	2001–2005	10.3	204	5-speed	not produced
2.3 V5	AZX	VR5 DOHC 20V, multi-point fuel injection	2324 cc	170 PS (125 kW; 168 hp) @6200 rpm	225 N⋅m (166 lb⋅ft) @3200 rpm	2000–2003	9.2	221	5-speed	5-speed
2.8 V6	AMX / ATQ / BBG	V6 DOHC 30V, multi-point fuel injection	2771 cc	190 PS (140 kW; 187 hp) – 193 PS (142 kW; 190 hp) @6000 rpm	260 N⋅m (190 lb⋅ft) – 280 N⋅m (210 lb⋅ft) @3200 rpm	2000–2005	7.8 – 9.0	232	5-speed	5-speed
4.0 W8	BDN / BDP	W8 DOHC 32V, multi-point fuel injection	3999 cc	275 PS (202 kW; 271 hp) @6000 rpm	370 N⋅m (270 lb⋅ft) @2750 rpm	2001–2004	6.8	250	6-speed	5-speed

B5.5 diesel engines
Short Descr	VW Engine Code	Engine Type	Displacement	Power (Max Output)	Torque (Max Output)	Years	Accel 0–100 km/h (sec.)	Top speed (km/h)	Transmission (manual)	Transmission (automatic)
1.9 TDI	AVB	I4 SOHC 8V, "Pumpe-Düse" (PD) unit injection	1896 cc	100 PS (74 kW; 99 hp) @4000 rpm	250 N⋅m (180 lb⋅ft) @1900 rpm	2000–2005	12.8	184	5-speed	5-speed
1.9 TDI	AWX	I4 SOHC 8V, "Pumpe-Düse" (PD) unit injection	1896 cc	130 PS (96 kW; 128 hp) @4000 rpm	285 N⋅m (210 lb⋅ft) @1750–2500 rpm	2000–2005	10.2	201	5-speed	5-speed
1.9 TDI	AVF	I4 SOHC 8V, "Pumpe-Düse" (PD) unit injection	1896 cc	130 PS (96 kW; 128 hp) @4000 rpm	310 N⋅m (230 lb⋅ft) @1900 rpm	2000–2005	10.2	201	6-speed	not produced
2.0 TDI	BGW	I4 SOHC 8V, "Pumpe-Düse" (PD) unit injection	1968 cc	136 PS (100 kW; 134 hp) @4000 rpm	335 N⋅m (247 lb⋅ft) @1900 rpm	2003–2005	10.0	205	6-speed	not produced
2.0 TDI	BHW	I4 SOHC 8V, "Pumpe-Düse" (PD) unit injection	1968 cc	136 PS (100 kW; 134 hp) @4000 rpm	335 N⋅m (247 lb⋅ft) @1900 rpm	2003–2005	10.0	205	Not Produced	5-speed
2.5 TDI	AKN	V6 DOHC 24V, Turbocharged Direct Injection	2496 cc	150 PS (110 kW; 148 hp) @4000 rpm	310 N⋅m (230 lb⋅ft) @1500–3200 rpm	2000–2003	9.8	214	6-speed	5-speed
2.5 TDI	BDG	V6 DOHC 24V, Turbocharged Direct Injection	2496 cc	163 PS (120 kW; 161 hp) @4000 rpm	350 N⋅m (260 lb⋅ft) @1500–3000 rpm	2003–2005	9.2	226	6-speed	5-speed
2.5 TDI	BDH / BAU	V6 DOHC 24V, Turbocharged Direct Injection	2496 cc	180 PS (132 kW; 178 hp) @4000 rpm	370 N⋅m (270 lb⋅ft) @1500–2500 rpm	2003–2005	8.9	223	6-speed	5-speed
