= Johann Leonhard Hug =

German Roman Catholic theologian, orientalist and biblical scholar (1765–1846)

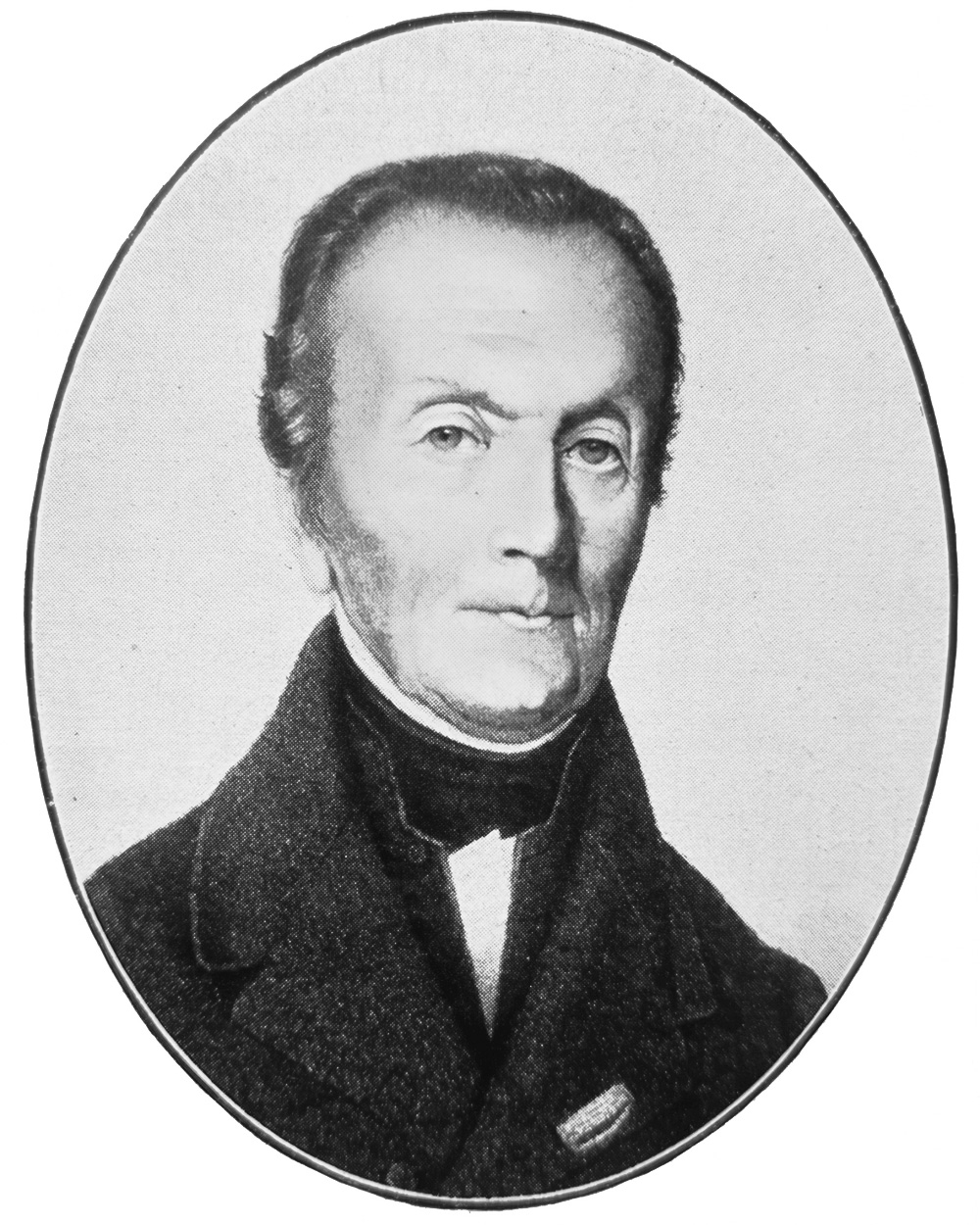
Johann Leonhard Hug

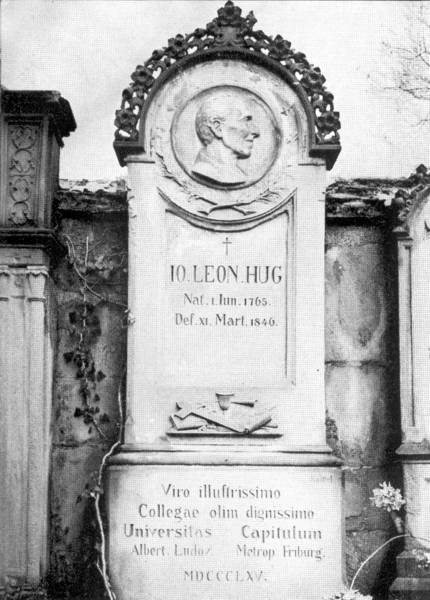
Johann Leonhard Hug's tomb

Johann Leonhard Hug (1 June 1765 in Constance – 11 March 1846 in Freiburg im Breisgau), was a German Roman Catholic theologian, orientalist and biblical scholar.

== Life ==
In 1783 he entered the University of Freiburg, where he became a pupil in the seminary for the training of priests, and soon distinguished himself in classical and Oriental philology as well as in biblical exegesis and criticism. In 1787 he became superintendent of studies in the seminary, and held this appointment until the breaking up of the establishment in 1790. In the following year he was called to the Freiburg chair of Oriental languages and Old Testament exegesis; to the duties of this post were added in 1793 those of the professorship of New Testament exegesis.

Declining calls to Breslau, Tübingen, and thrice to Bonn, Hug continued at Freiburg for upwards of thirty years, taking an occasional literary tour to Munich, Paris or Italy. In 1827 he resigned some of his professorial work, but continued in active duty until in the autumn of 1845 he fell ill and died on 11 March 1846. Johann Martin Augustin Scholz was his pupil.

== Works ==
Hug's earliest publication was the first installment of his Einleitung; in it he argued against Johann Gottfried Eichhorn in favour of the "borrowing hypothesis" of the origin of the Synoptic Gospels, maintaining the priority of Matthew, and asserting that the present Greek text was the original.

His subsequent works were dissertations on the origin of alphabetical writing (Die Erfindung der Buchstabenschrift, 1801), on the antiquity of the Codex Vaticanus (1810), and on ancient mythology (Untersuchungen über den Mythos der berühmtern Völker der alten Welt. Vorzüglich der Griechen; dessen Entstehen, Veränderungen und Innhalt, 1812); a new interpretation of the Song of Solomon (Des hohe Lied in einer noch unversuchten Deutung, 1813), to the effect that the lover represents King Hezekiah, while by his beloved is intended the remnant left in Israel after the deportation of the ten tribes; and treatises on the indissoluble character of the matrimonial bond (De conjugii christiani vinculo indissolubili commentatio exegetica, 1816) and on the Alexandrian version of the Pentateuch (1818).

His Einleitung in die Schriften des Neuen Testaments, his major work, was completed in 1808 (fourth German edition, 1847; English translations by Daniel Guilford Wait, London, 1827, and by David Fosdick and Moses Stuart, New York, 1836; French partial translation by J. E. Cellerier, Geneva, 1823). In the portion relating to the history of the text he holds it to have been current up to the middle of the 3rd century only in a common edition, of which recensions were afterwards made by Hesychius, an Egyptian bishop, by Lucian of Antioch and by Origen.

From 1828 until it ceased to be published in 1834, Hug was a regular contributor to the Zeitschrift für die Geistlichkeit des Erzbisthums Freyburg. Hug was also the first editor (from 1839 until his death in 1846) of the newly founded Zeitschrift für Theologie, published by the Catholic Theological Faculty in Freiburg.

- Hug's introduction to the New Testament, transl. by D. Fosdick and Moses Stuart, Andover 1836
- Die mosaische Geschichte des Menschen, Frankfurt 1793;
- Die Ursprünge der menschlichen Erkenntnis, Basel 1796;
- Einleitung in die Schriften des Neuen Testaments, 2 Te., 1808 (1847^{2});
- De antiquitate Codicis Vaticani commentatio, Freiburg: Herder 1810;
- Untersuchungen über den Mythos der berühmtern Völker der alten Welt Vorzüglich der Griechen; dessen Entstehen, Veränderungen und Innhalt, Freiburg 1812 (1823^{2});
- Das hohe Lied einer noch unversuchten Deutung, 1813;
- J. L. M., Schutzschr. f. seine Deutung des Hhld. u. dessen weitere Erl., Freiburg 1815;
- De conjugii christiani vinculo indissolubili commentatio exegetica, 1816;
- De Pentateuchi versione Alexandrina commentatio, 1818;
- Gutachten über das Leben Jesu v. David Friedrich Strauß (1835), 2 Te., 1840–44 (l8542)
