= Volkswagen Passat Lingyu =

Mid-size sedan

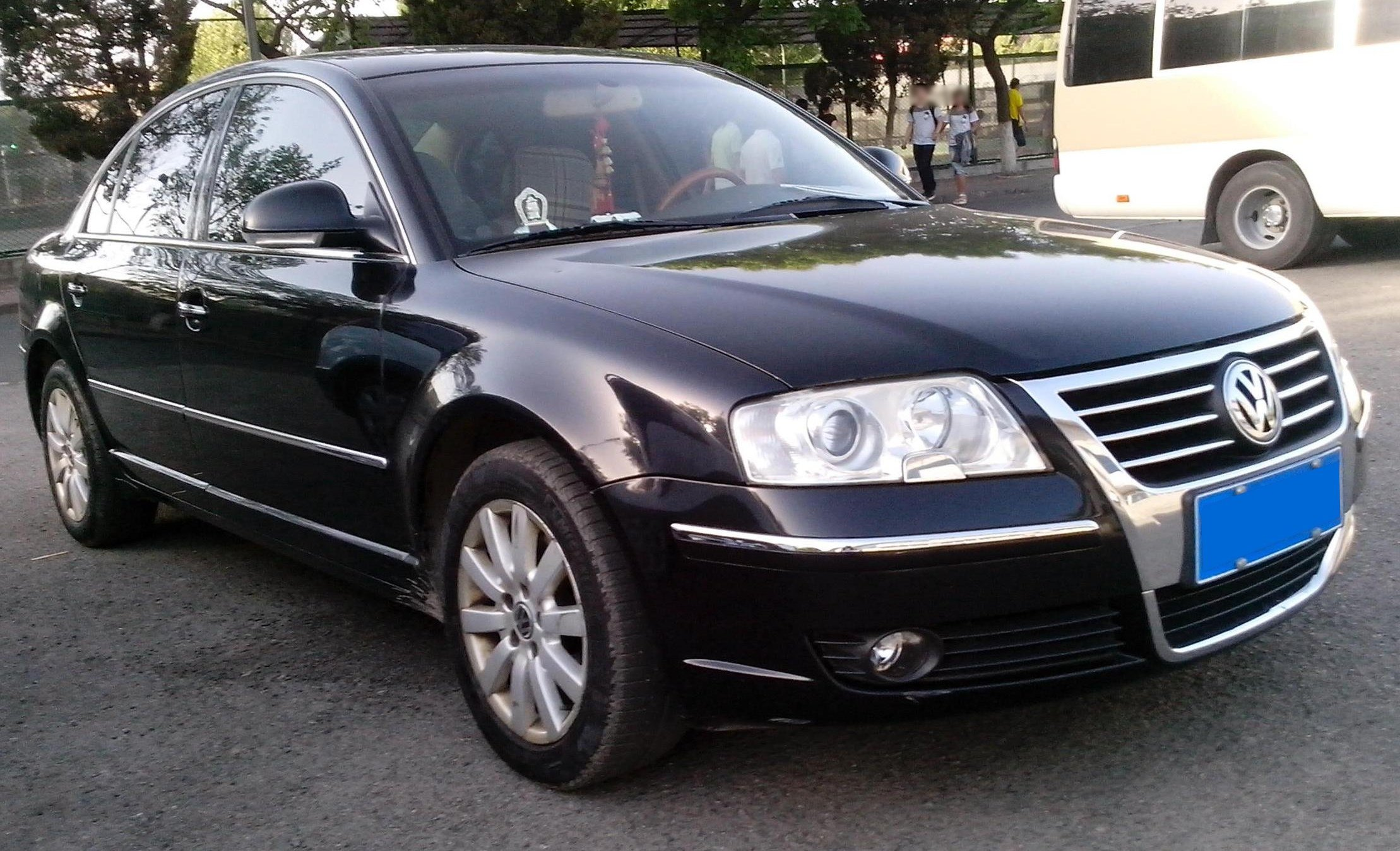
- Volkswagen Passat Lingyu

Overview
- Manufacturer: Volkswagen
- Production: 2005–2011
- Assembly: China: Nanjing (2008–2009); Anting (SAIC-VW)
- Designer: Murat Günak

Body and chassis
- Class: Mid-size car (D)
- Body style: 4-door sedan
- Layout: Longitudinal Front engine, front-wheel drive
- Platform: Volkswagen Group B5 platform
- Related: Škoda Superb (3U); Volkswagen Passat (B5)

Powertrain
- Engine: Petrol: 1.8 L EA113 turbo I4; 2.0 L EA113 I4; 2.8 L BBG V6
- Transmission: 4-speed automatic; 5-speed manual; 5-speed automatic

Dimensions
- Wheelbase: 2,803 mm (110.4 in)
- Length: 4,789 mm (188.5 in)
- Width: 1,765 mm (69.5 in)
- Height: 1,470 mm (57.9 in)
- Curb weight: 1,426–1,580 kg (3,144–3,483 lb)

Chronology
- Predecessor: Volkswagen Passat Classic V Volkswagen Santana Vista
- Successor: Volkswagen Passat (NMS)

The Volkswagen Passat Lingyu (Chinese: 大众帕萨特领驭) is a Chinese mid-size car produced by Volkswagen with its joint venture Shanghai Volkswagen plants in Anting and Nanjing.

== Overview ==
The Passat Lingyu was launched in November 2005 and replaced the Volkswagen Passat (B5) sold internationally. It is based on the same platform as the Škoda Superb I with more luxurious trim levels. In 2009, it was replaced by a facelift variant called the Volkswagen Passat New Lingyu.

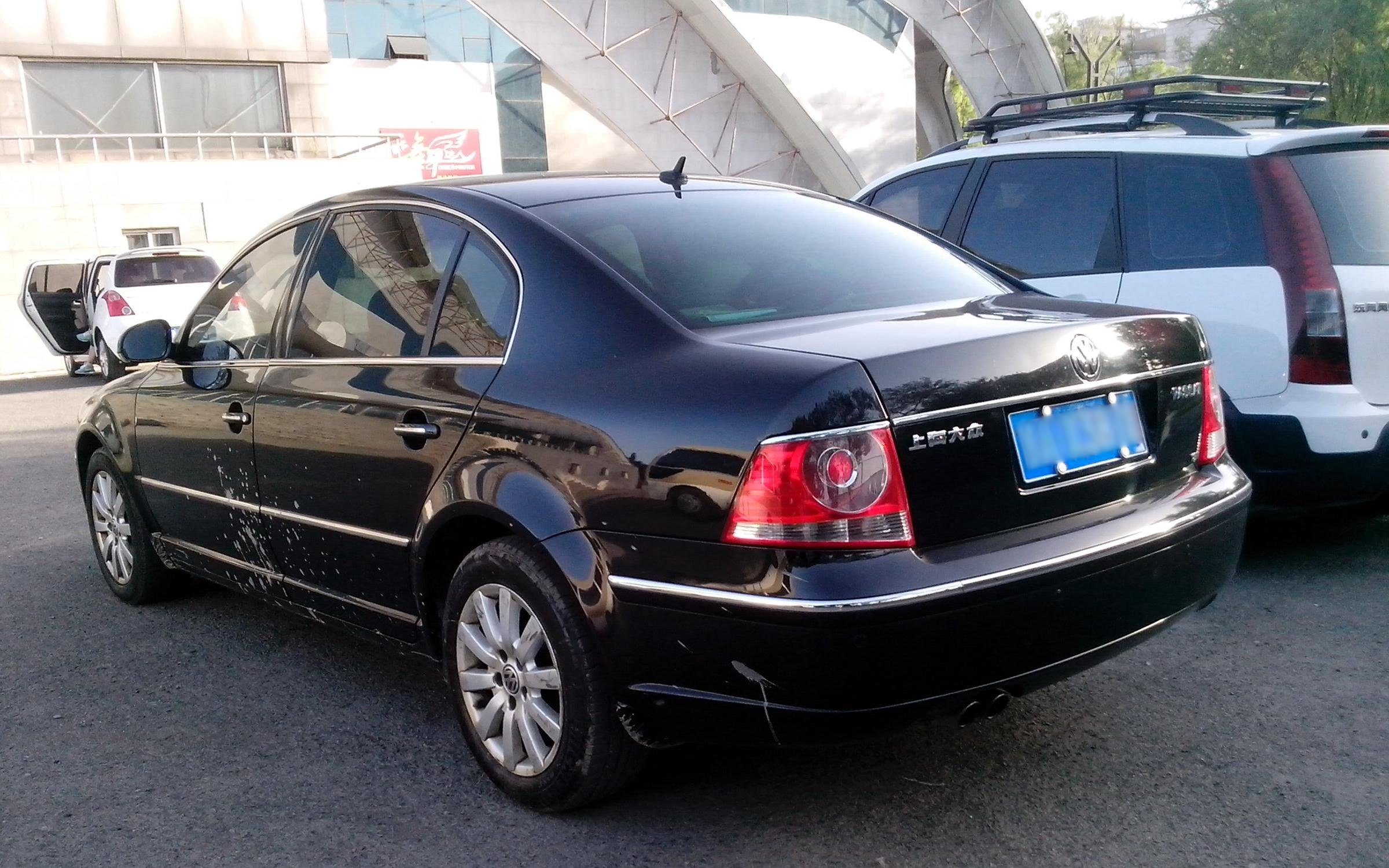
2005–2009 Passat Lingyu rear

The Passat Lingyu was offered in following equipment lines: Standard (标准型), Luxury (豪华型), VIP and Flagship (旗舰型). The Standard had a four-cylinder engine with a displacement of 1984 cc and a power of 116 PS (85 kW; 114 hp). The Luxury and the VIP were delivered with a turbo engine with a displacement of 1781 cc and a power of 150 PS (110 kW; 148 hp). The Flagship was the top model of the Lingyu lineup. It was motorized with a V6 engine with a displacement of 2771 cc and a power of 190 PS (140 kW; 187 hp).

The car was designed by Istanbul-born car designer Murat Günak.

Volkswagen built 20 examples of fuel-cell Passat Lingyu in mid-2008 to be presented at the 2008 Beijing Olympics.

== Facelift ==
A facelifted version was launched in 2009 and replaced the Volkswagen Passat Lingyu. The Passat New Lingyu was offered in following equipment lines: Zunjie, Zunping, Zunxiang, Zhizun and Zunshi.

The following engines were offered: 1984 cc 116 PS (85 kW; 114 hp); 1781 cc 150 PS (110 kW; 148 hp); 2771 cc 190 PS (140 kW; 187 hp).

The Passat New Lingyu was replaced by the Volkswagen Passat NMS in April 2011.

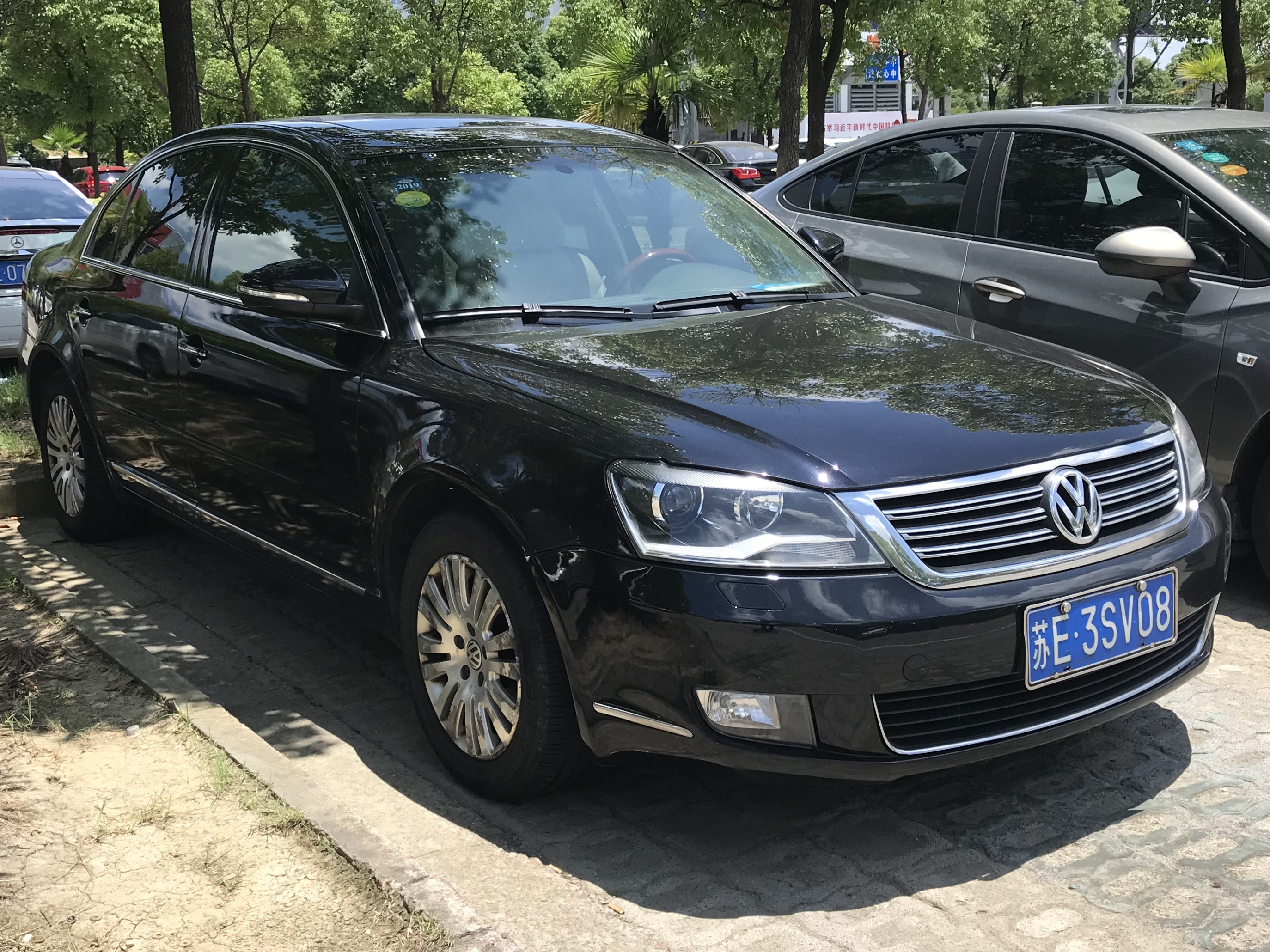
Passat New Lingyu (front view)

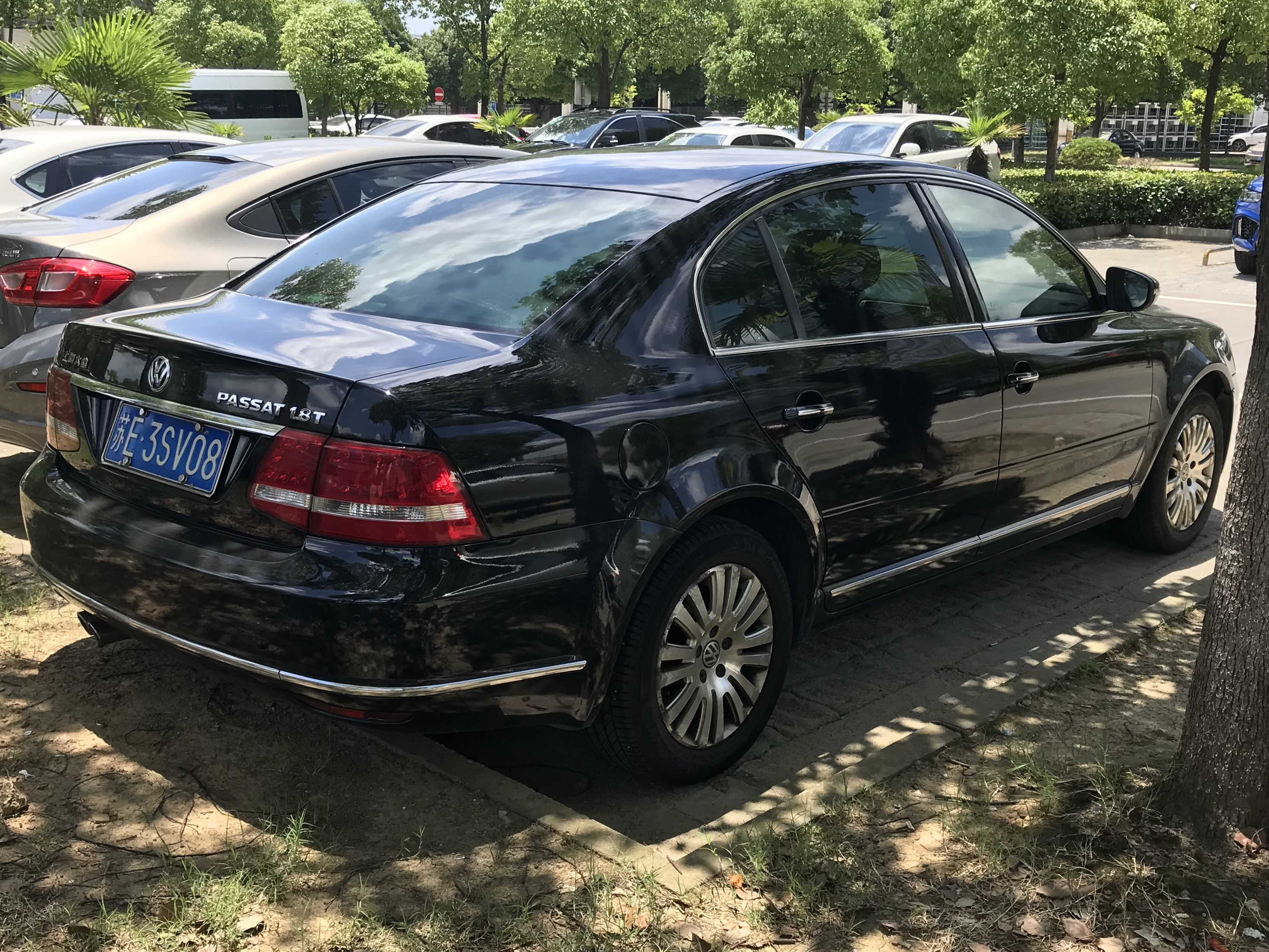
Passat New Lingyu (rear view)
