= Longitudinal engine =

Internal combustion engine mounted with the crankshaft lengthwise

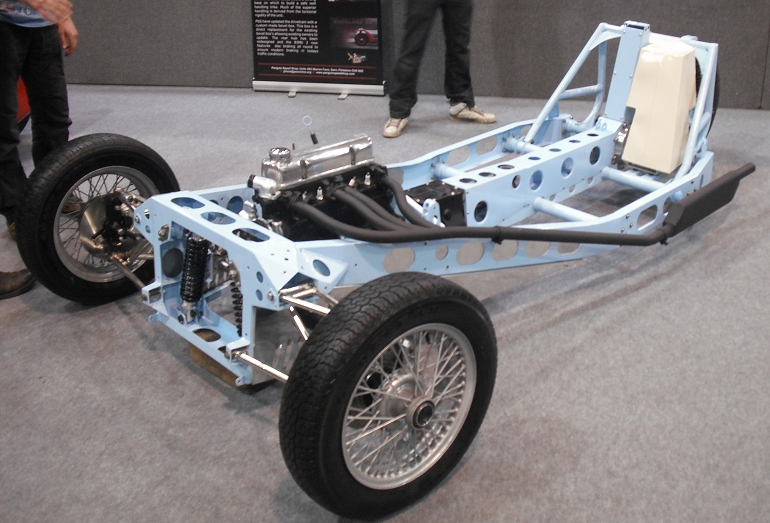
Longitudinal engine in a three-wheeler chassis

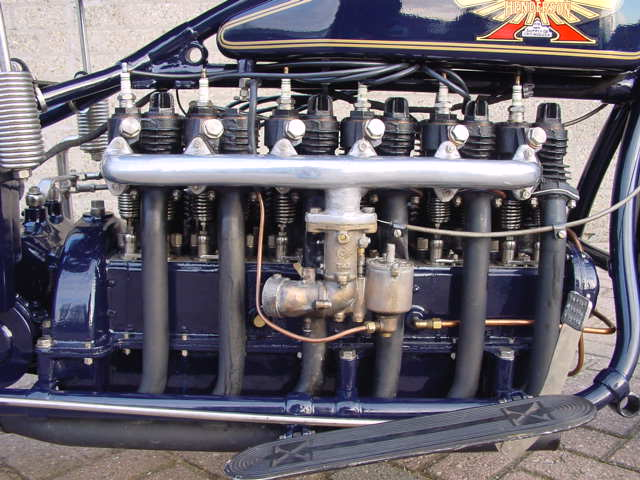
Longitudinal inline-six cylinder engine in a Henderson De Luxe Supersix of 1926

In automotive engineering, a longitudinal engine is an internal combustion engine in which the crankshaft is oriented along the long axis of the vehicle, from front to back.

This is in contrast to a transverse engine, where the crankshaft runs from side to side. Although there are many variations of cylinder number and layout, all car engines are either longitudinal or transverse.

== Use ==
This type of motor is usually used for rear-wheel drive cars, except for some Audi, SAAB, the Oldsmobile Toronado, and the 1967 Cadillac Eldorado equipped with longitudinal engines in front wheel drive. In front-wheel drive cars a transverse engine is usually used. Trucks often have longitudinal engines with rear-wheel drive.

For motorcycles, the use of a particular type depends on the drive: in the case of a chain or belt drive a transverse engine is usually used, and with shaft drives a longitudinal engine. Longitudinal engines in motorcycles do have one disadvantage: the "tipping point" of the crankshaft tilts along the entire motorcycle to a greater or lesser degree when accelerating. This is partly resolved by having other components, such as the generator and the gearbox, rotate in the opposite direction to the crankshaft.

Most larger, "premium" vehicles use the longitudinal engine orientation in combination with rear-wheel drive, because powerful engines such as the inline-6 and 90° big-bore V8 are usually too long to fit in a FF transverse engine bay. By contrast most mainstream modern vehicles use front-wheel drive along with a transverse engine arrangement since they are usually equipped with inline-4 or V6 engines. While both layouts can be adapted for all-wheel drive, the longitudinal engine orientation has a more balanced weight distribution leading to superior handling characteristics, but is less efficient in terms of packaging and interior space.

Cars with longitudinal engines usually have a smaller minimum turning circle than those with transverse engines. This is because there is more space to the sides of the engine, allowing deeper wheel arches so the front wheels are able to turn through a greater angle.

In the late 1960s, GM divisions Oldsmobile and Cadillac had front-wheel drive models Toronado and Eldorado respectively, with a longitudinal V8 engine and an integrated automatic transmission and differential unit powering the front wheels. Honda and Toyota also offered front-wheel drive cars with longitudinal engines, namely Honda Vigor, Acura/Honda Legend/RL, and Toyota Tercel.

== Common types ==
The following is a list of typical examples of types of engines which can be placed in motor vehicles:

- In-line or straight engine – where two, three, four, five, six, and even eight cylinders are placed in a single plane.
- V engine – where two, four, six, eight, ten, twelve, or even sixteen cylinders are placed in two separate planes, looking like a "V" when viewed from the end of the crankshaft.
- Flat or boxer engine – where two, four, six or more cylinders are arranged in two diametrically horizontally opposed planes.
- W engine – where two (narrow angle) vee engines are siamesed together (within 180°), where at eight, twelve or sixteen cylinders are arranged in four separate planes.
