= Worth the Wait =

Worth the Wait may refer to:

== Albums ==
- Worth the Wait (EP), by Lindsay Ell, or the title song, 2017
- Worth the Wait, by Carnage the Executioner, 2011
- Worth the Wait, by Futrel, 1989
- Worth the Wait, by Norbotten Big Band, featuring Tim Hagans, 2007
- Worth the Wait, by Peaches & Herb, 1980
- Worth the Wait, a mixtape by Los, 2011
- Worth the Wait, an EP by Dozzi, 2019
- Worth the Wait, an EP by the Snails, 2013

== Songs ==
- "Worth the Wait", by i:Scintilla from Dying and Falling, 2010
- "Worth the Wait", by Jordin Sparks from Jordin Sparks, 2007
- "Worth the Wait", by Kali Uchis from Red Moon in Venus, 2023
- "Worth the Wait", by KC Concepcion from KC, 2010
- "Worth the Wait", by We Are Scientists from With Love and Squalor, 2005

== Other uses ==
- Worth the Wait, a group that competed on The Voice, American season 19, 2020
- Worth the Wait, a 2002 book by Jason Stevens
- Worth the Wait, a 2011 book by Jayson Stark
- Worth the Wait, a 2025 film from Tubi
