= Daniel Guilford Wait =

English clergyman, Hebrew scholar and religious writer

Daniel Guildford Wait (1789–1850) was an English clergyman, Hebrew scholar and religious writer.

== Life ==
He was the son of Daniel Wait of Bristol. He matriculated from University College, Oxford, on 20 October 1809, and moved over to St. John's College, Cambridge, where he graduated LL.B. in 1819 and LL.D. in 1824. He was ordained as curate in Pucklechurch, near Bristol, and on 12 March 1819 was presented to the rectory of Blagdon in Somerset. He became bankrupt in 1833 and was a prisoner in Fleet Prison. Married twice, to Priscilla Morgan Thorne in 1814 and to Eliza Wylde in 1819 and had several children. Wait died at Blagdon on 30 September 1850.

== Works ==
His first publication in 1811 was 'A Defence of a Critique of the Hebrew Word Nachash,' London, 8vo, in which he supported the conclusion that Eve was deceived by a serpent and not by an ape, as Adam Clarke had urged in the 'Classical, Biblical, and Oriental Journal.' His chief work, 'Jewish, Oriental, and Classical Antiquities' (Cambridge, 8vo), which appeared in 1823, was compiled with much labour and research.

He was also the author of:

- 'An Inquiry into the Religious Knowledge which the Heathen Philosophers derived from the Jewish Scriptures,' Cambridge, 1813.
- 'A Comparison of certain Traditions found in the Thalmud, Targumiy and Rabbinical Writers, with circumstances in the Life of our Saviour,' Cambridge, 1814.
- 'A Critical Examination of some few Scripture Texts, which maintain the Doctrine of a Trinity in Unity,' London, 1819.
- 'A Course of Sermons preached before the University of Cambridge,' London, 1826.
- 'A Selection from the Psalms,' London, 1848.

He translated 'An Introduction to the Writings of the New Testament,' London, 1827, from the German of Johann Leonhard von Hug; his translation was superseded by that of Moses Stuart (Andover, 1836). He also edited the 'Repertorium Theologicum,' London, 1829, of which only one number appeared.
