= The Wait =

The Wait may refer to:

== Music ==
- The Wait (ZOX album), a 2006 album by Zox
- The Wait (EP), a 2011 EP by Jessica Poland
- The Wait (Tebey album), a 2012 album by Tebey
- The Wait (Phase album), a 2014 album by Phase
- The Wait (Vika and Linda album), a 2021 album by Vika and Linda
- "The Wait", a song by The Pretenders from their 1979 album The Pretenders
- "The Wait" (song), a 1980 song by Killing Joke
- "The Wait", a song by The American Analog Set from their 1999 album The Golden Band
- "The Wait", a song by Built to Spill from their 2006 album You in Reverse

== Other ==
- The Wait (2013 film), an American film by M. Blash
- The Wait (2015 film), an Italian film
- The Wait (2021 film), a Nigerian film
- The Wait (2021 Finnish film) (Odotus), a Finnish film directed by Aku Louhimies
- The Wait (2023 film), a Spanish fantasy horror thriller film written and directed by F. Javier Gutiérrez
- "The Wait" (short story), a 1950 short story by Argentine writer Jorge Luis Borges
- The Wait (TV series), a 2006 Syrian drama TV series

== See also ==
- Worth the Wait (disambiguation)
- "The Weight", a 1968 song by The Band
