= Maude C. Waitt =

American politician

Maude Comstock Waitt

Member of the Ohio House of Representatives
- In office January 1922 – December 1930

Personal details
- Born: August 11, 1875 Middlebury, Vermont
- Died: December 13, 1935 (aged 60) Lakewood, Ohio
- Party: Republican

Maude Comstock Waitt (1875 – 1935) was a member of the Ohio Senate. She was one of the first six women elected into the Ohio General Assembly in 1922. She sponsored 3 bills in 1923, all of which passed in both the Senate and the House of Representatives. She was reelected in 1924, 1926, and 1928.

Waitt died in her sleep on December 13, 1935, after a long illness.
