= W8 engine =

Engine configuration

A W8 engine is an eight-cylinder piston engine with two banks of two cylinders each, arranged in a W configuration.

In practice, the W8 engine is created from two narrow-angle (15 degree) VR4 engines mounted at an angle of 72 degrees from each other on a common crankshaft. Thus, the resulting four banks align to form a "W".

W8 engines are much less common than V8 engines, and the only W8 engine to reach production was manufactured by Volkswagen.

== Volkswagen W8 engine ==
The Volkswagen 4-litre W8 engine was available in the Volkswagen Passat (B5.5) from September 2001 to September 2004. Production was minimal at only 11,000 units.

The engine had a displacement of 3,999 cc (4 L), had a peak power rating of 202 kW (271 hp) at 6,000 rpm and a peak torque rating of 370 N⋅m (273 lb⋅ft) at 2,750 rpm. Power and torque outputs were lower than competitors V8 engines with similar capacity, however the W8 engine was praised for its smoothness.

Sales of the W8-engined Passat models were poor, and production was discontinued when the next generation of Passat switched from a longitudinal engine to a transverse engine layout, which made packaging of the wide W8 engine difficult. The W8 was effectively replaced by the Volkswagen 3.6-litre VR6 petrol engine.

=== 4.0 WR8 32v 202kW ===
The 'W8' badged engine is an eight-cylinder W engine of two banks of four cylinders, formed by joining two 15° VR4 engines, placed on a single crankshaft, with each cylinder 'double-bank' now at a 72° vee-angle.

identification
parts code prefix: 07D, ID codes: BDN (09/01-09/04), BDP (05/02-09/04)
engine displacement & engine configuration
3,999 cc (244.0 cu in) 72° WR8 engine; bore x stroke: 84.0 mm × 90.2 mm (3.31 in × 3.55 in), stroke ratio: 0.93:1 – undersquare/long-stroke, 499.9 cc per cylinder, compression ratio: 10.8:1
cylinder block & crankcase
cast aluminium alloy with two-part cast aluminium alloy oil sump; five main bearings; die-forged steel crankshaft with split crankpins; Lanchester principle balance shafts one above the other, counter-rotating at twice the crankshaft speed, symmetric to the middle of the crankshaft, upper one driven by a toothed belt
cylinder heads & valvetrain
cast aluminium alloy; four unequal-length valves per cylinder, 32 valves total, low-friction roller finger cam followers with automatic hydraulic valve clearance compensation, simplex roller chain-driven (relay method, using three chains) double overhead camshafts, continuous vane-adjustable variable valve timing for intake and exhaust camshafts with up to 52° variance inlet camshafts and 22° for exhaust camshafts
aspiration
hot-film air mass meter, single throttle body with electronically controlled Bosch 'E-Gas' 'drive by wire' throttle butterfly valve, four-part two-channel cast aluminium resonance intake manifold
fuel system, ignition system, engine management
two linked common rail fuel distributor rails, multi-point electronic sequential indirect fuel injection with eight intake manifold-sited fuel injectors; centrally positioned NGK longlife spark plugs, mapped direct ignition with eight individual direct-acting single spark coils; Bosch Motronic ME electronic engine control unit (ECU), cylinder-selective knock control via four knock sensors, permanent lambda control; 95 RON/ROZ(91 AKI) EuroSuperPlus (premium) unleaded recommended for maximum performance and fuel economy
exhaust system
vacuum-operated secondary air injection pump for direct injection into exhaust ports to assist cold start operation, one cast iron exhaust manifold per cylinder bank with integrated ceramic catalytic converter per cylinder bank, four heated oxygen sensors monitoring pre- and post catalyst exhaust gasses, EU4 compliant
dimensions
mass: 190 kg (419 lb), length: 420 mm (16.5 in) length, width: 710 mm (28.0 in), height: 683 mm (26.9 in)
DIN-rated motive power & torque output
202 kW (275 PS; 271 bhp) at 6,000 rpm; 370 N⋅m (273 lbf⋅ft) at 2,750 rpm (11.6 bar (168 psi) MEP); max. engine speed: 6,400 rpm (19.2 m/s)
references
"Volkswagen Passat W8 4motion – spec sheet" (PDF). CarAndDriver.com. Hachette Filipacchi Media U.S., Inc. Archived from the original (PDF) on 9 June 2011.
"2002 Volkswagen Passat W8". AutoWeek.com. Crain Communications, Inc. 21 August 2001. Archived from the original on 19 January 2011.
"Volkswagen Passat W8". evo. Dennis Publishing Ltd. March 2002. Archived from the original on 1 September 2010.
"VW Passat W8 4motion". WorldCarFans.com. Volkswagen AG. 22 April 2002. Archived from the original on 20 April 2013.
"W8 voted best technical innovation at the Moscow Motor Show". WorldCarFans.com. Volkswagen AG. 2 December 2001. Archived from the original on 29 July 2013.

=== Applications ===
- Volkswagen Passat B5.5 W8 4motion

==== Awards ====
was voted 'best technical innovation', and awarded the "Golden Pegasus" by "Za ruljom" at the Moscow Motor Show

== See also ==
- VR6 engine
