= Audi A3 =

Small family car

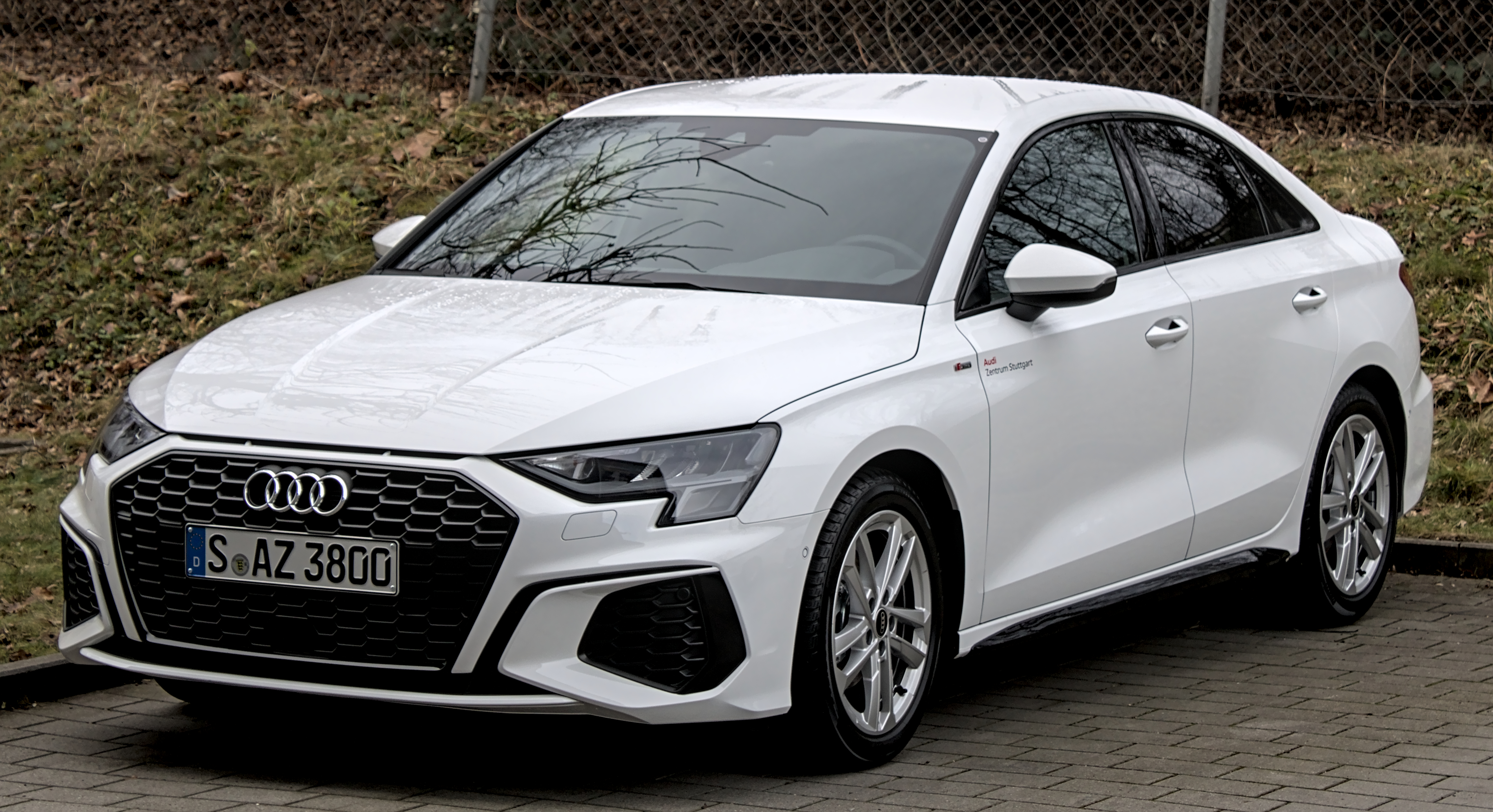
- Audi A3 Saloon (4th generation)

Overview
- Manufacturer: Audi AG
- Production: 1996–present

Body and chassis
- Class: Small family car (C)
- Body style: 3 or 5-door hatchback 4-door saloon
- Layout: Front-engine, front-wheel-drive/all-wheel-drive (quattro)

The Audi A3 is a small family car (C-segment) manufactured and marketed by the German automaker Audi AG since September 1996.

The first two generations of the Audi A3 were based on the Volkswagen Group A platform, while the third and fourth generations use the Volkswagen Group MQB platform.

== First generation (Typ 8L; 1996) ==
First generation
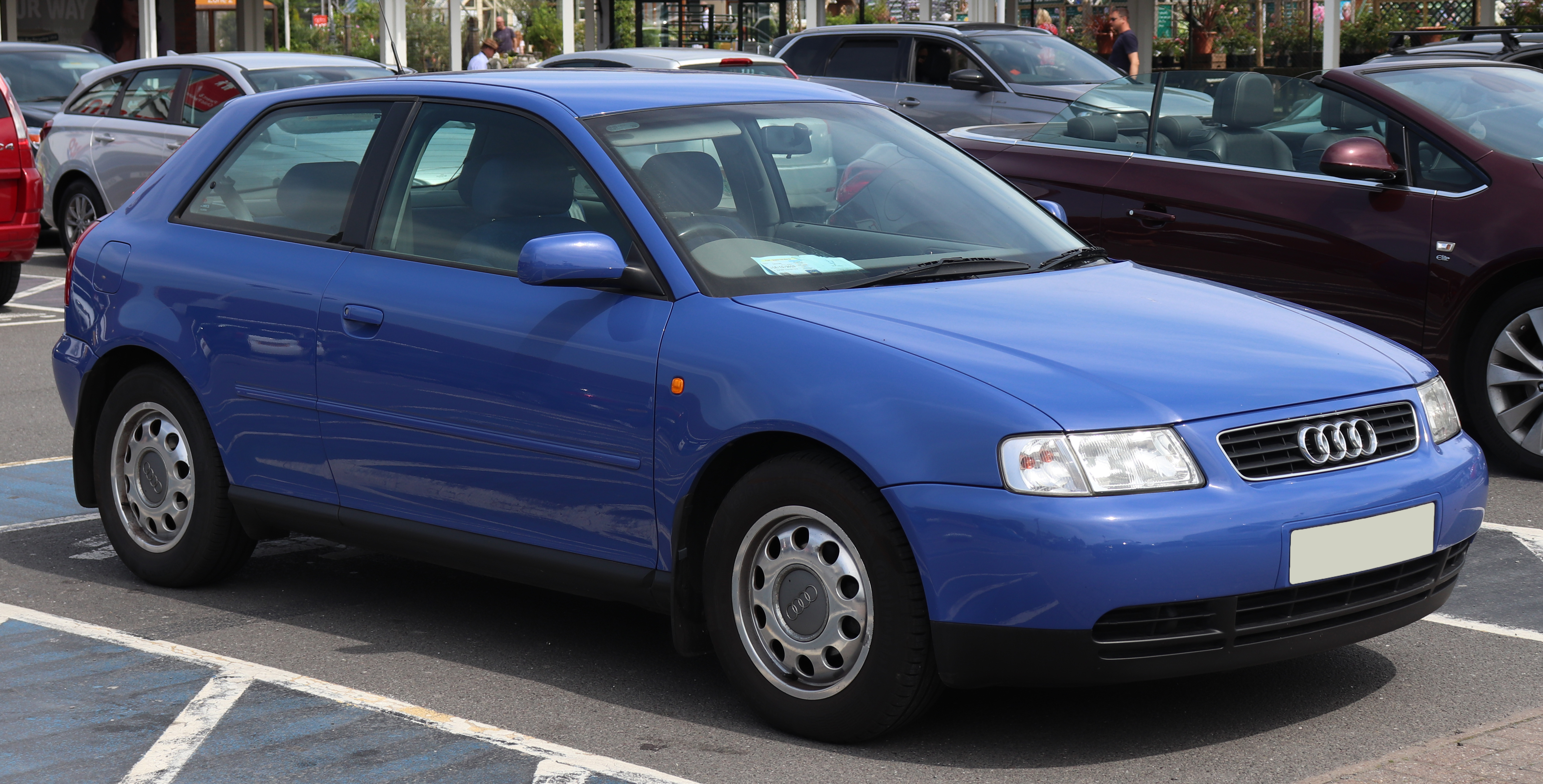
- Audi A3 3-door (pre-facelift)

Overview
- Model code: 8L
- Production: September 1996–2003
- Assembly: Germany: Ingolstadt (1997 – 2003); Hungary: Győr (April 2001 – April 2003); Brazil: Curitiba (Volkswagen do Brasil: 1999–2006)
- Designer: Dirk van Braeckel (1992)

Body and chassis
- Body style: 3-door hatchback 5-door hatchback
- Platform: Volkswagen Group A4 (PQ34)
- Related: Volkswagen Golf Mk4; SEAT León

Powertrain
- Engine: petrol: 1.6 L I4; 1.8 L 20v I4; 1.8 L 20v turbo I4; diesel: 1.9 L TDI PD I4
- Transmission: 5/6-speed Manual; 4/5-speed Automatic

Dimensions
- Wheelbase: A3 2,513 mm (98.9 in) quattro & S3: 2,519 mm (99.2 in)
- Length: A3 4,152 mm (163.5 in); S3 4,159 mm (163.7 in)
- Width: A3 1,735 mm (68.3 in); S3 1,763 mm (69.4 in)
- Height: A3 1,423 mm (56.0 in); S3 1,415 mm (55.7 in)

Audi announced the first generation A3 (Typ 8L) in June 1995. The model was launched for the European market in September 1996 and marked Audi's return to small cars after 19 years, following the demise of the Audi 50 in 1978.

The A3 was the first Volkswagen Group model to use the PQ34 (or "A4") platform, bearing close resemblance to the Volkswagen Golf Mk4, which arrived a year later. Within three years of the A3's launch, the PQ34 platform was utilised by seven different vehicles.

Initially, the A3 was only available as a three-door hatchback; this was done to give the model a sportier image and differentiate it from the Golf. Offered with transversely mounted inline four-cylinder engines in both front and quattro four-wheel drive, the A3 was Audi's eighth model to have five valves per cylinder. The dashboard was also used by the first generation SEAT León and second generation SEAT Toledo.

The United Kingdom received the Audi A3 in November 1996.

In 1999, Audi expanded the A3 range with the introduction of a five-door hatch and two new engine options; a 1.8 L turbocharged inline four-cylinder rated at 180 PS (132 kW; 178 hp), and a 1.9 L TDI diesel with unit injector "Pumpe Düse" (PD) technology and a variable geometry turbocharger. The four-wheel drive A3 1.8T Quattro used either the 150 PS (110 kW; 148 hp) or 180 PS (132 kW; 178 hp) engine, and the same Haldex Traction-based quattro system as the Audi S3 and Audi TT.

In late 2000, the A3 range was updated with new headlights and taillights, an improved interior, and other minor cosmetic changes alongside the introduction of a six-speed manual gearbox on the 180 PS (132 kW; 178 hp) 1.8T and new 130 PS (96 kW; 128 hp) 1.9 TDI.

With this update, Audi's electronic stability control, traction-control, and brake force distribution systems became standard in some countries.

Although the first generation Audi A3 was replaced in Europe in 2003, it continued to be sold in select markets; Brazilian production of Typ 8L A3 continued until 2006.

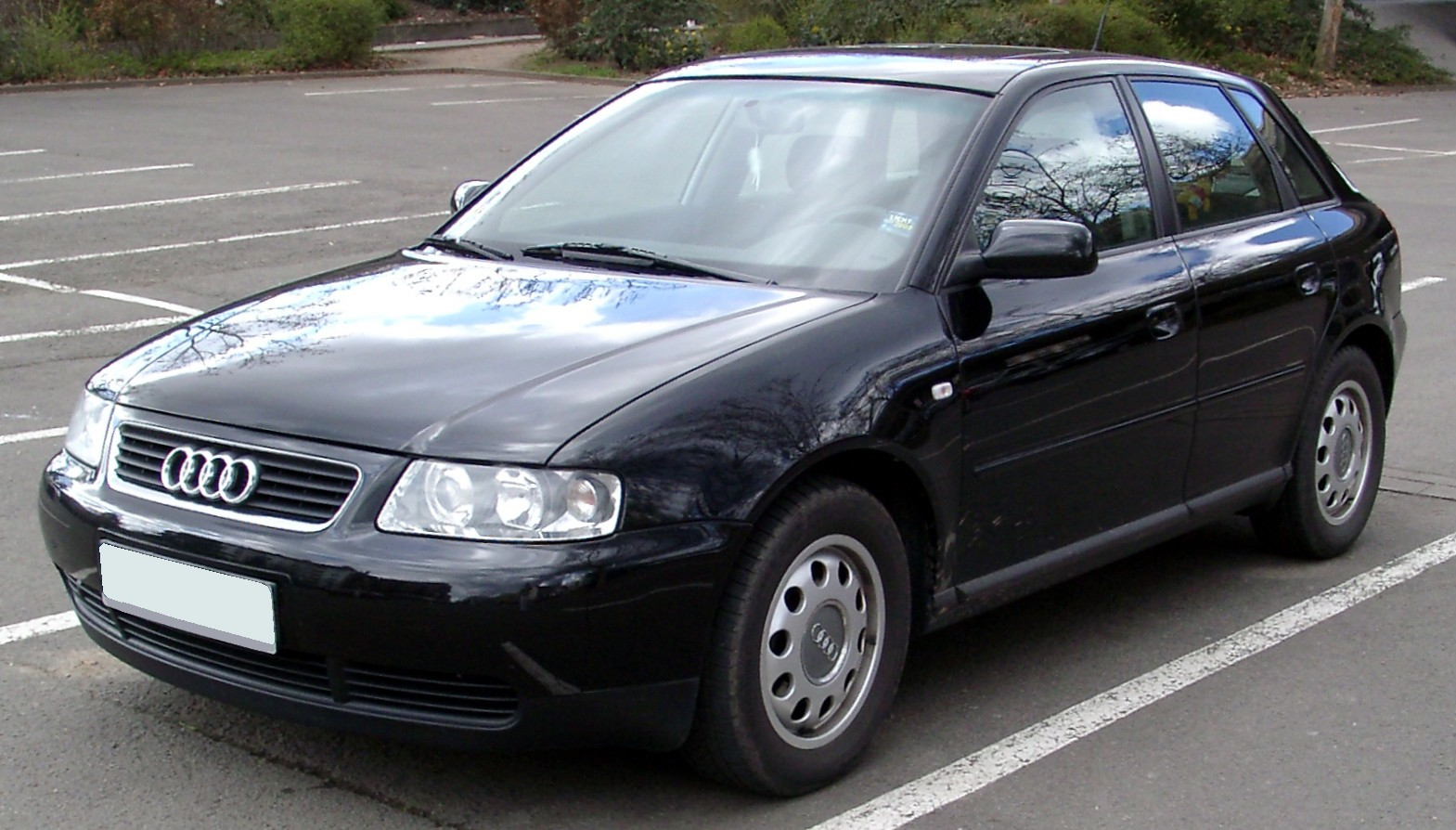
Audi A3 5-door (post-facelift)

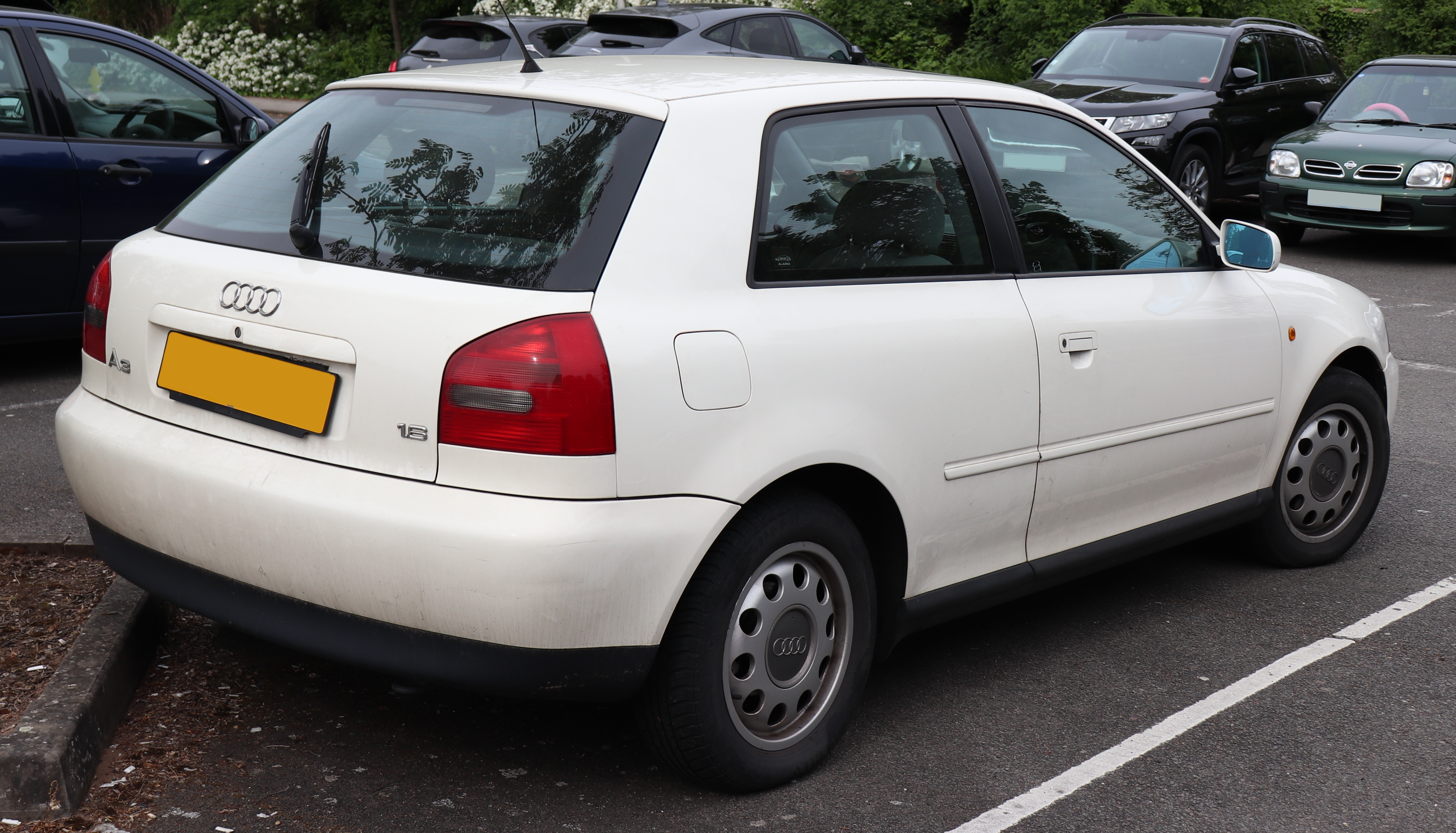
Audi A3 3-door (pre-facelift)

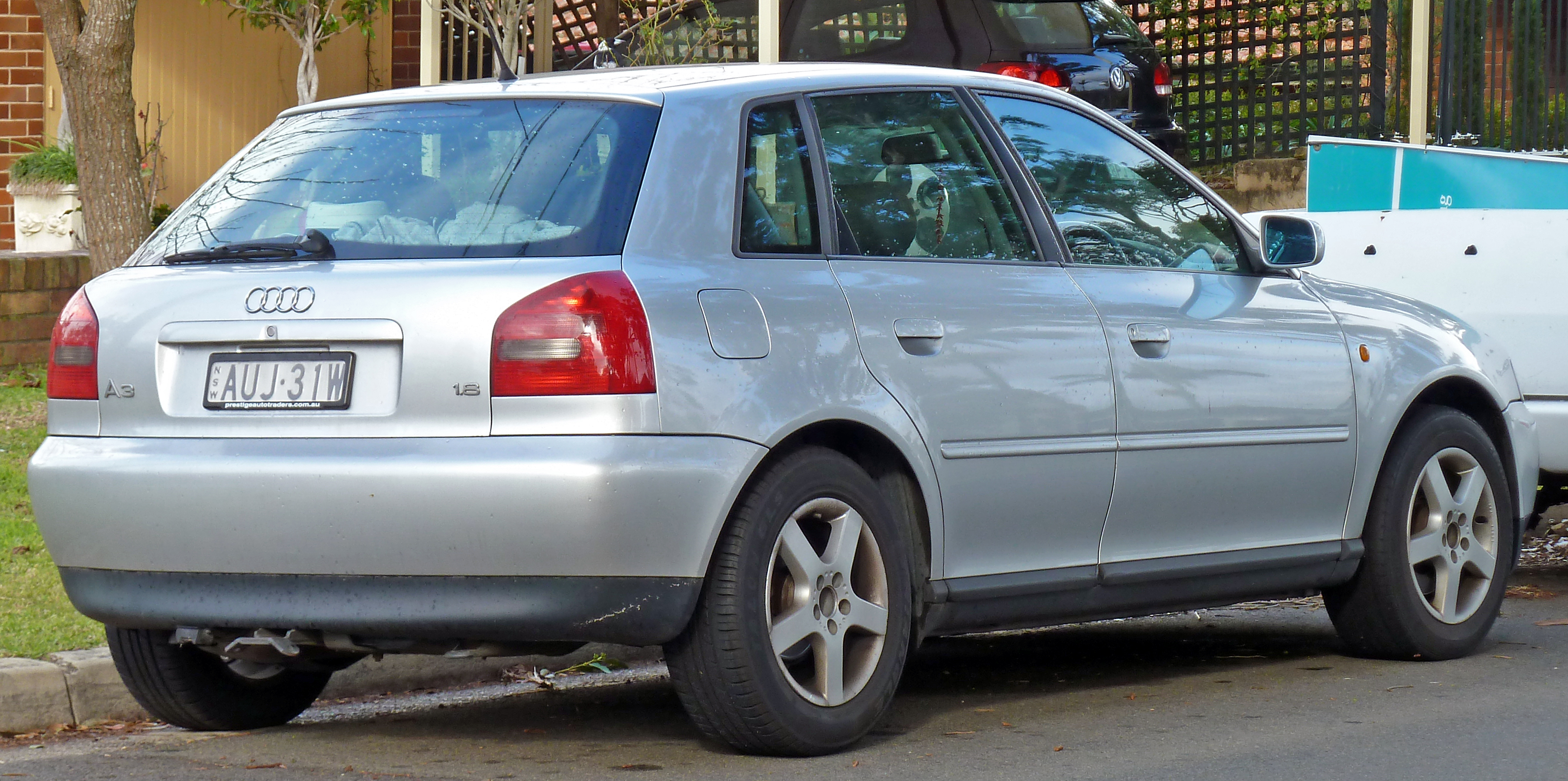
Audi A3 5-door (pre-facelift)

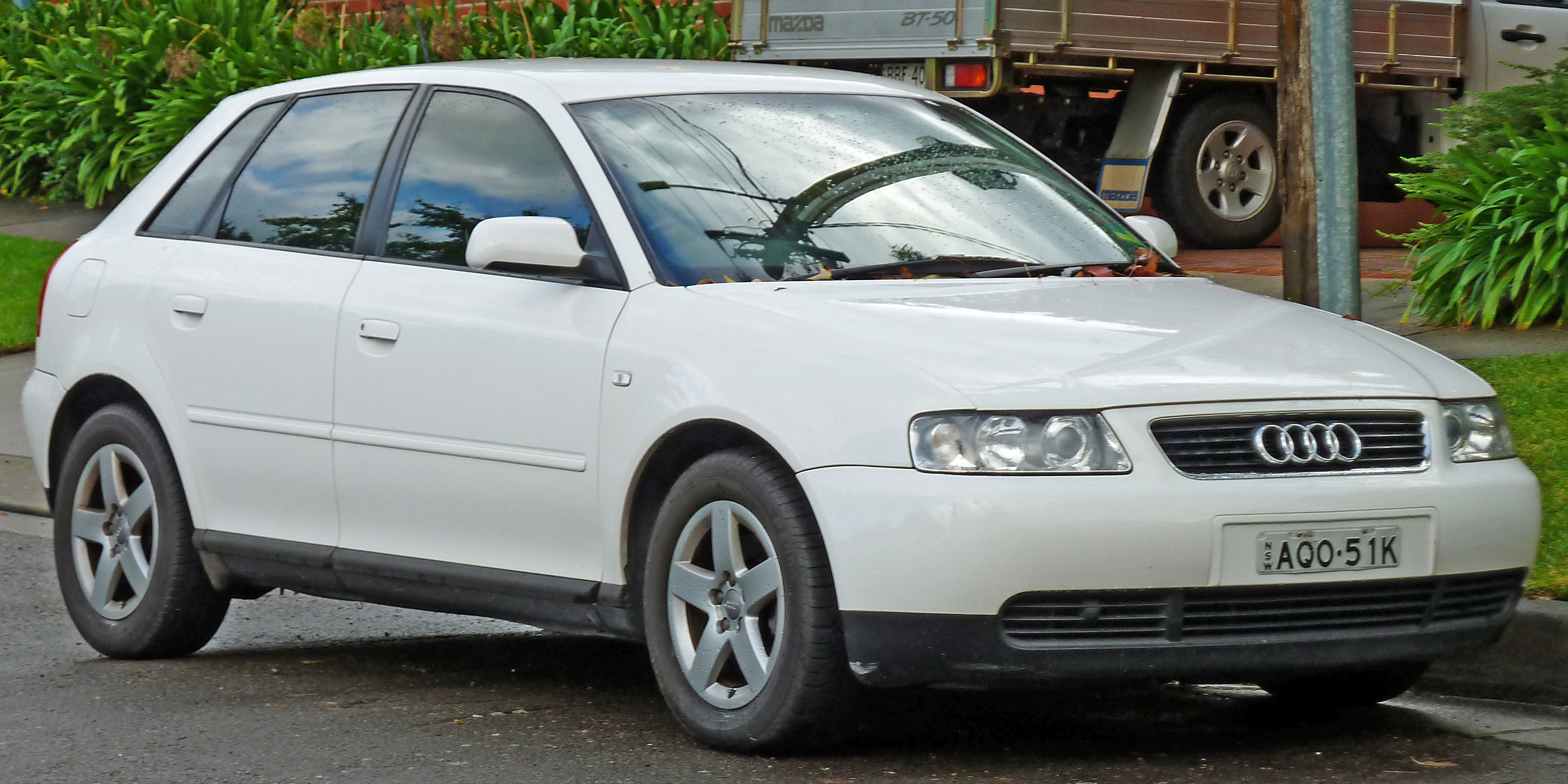
Audi A3 5-door (post-facelift)

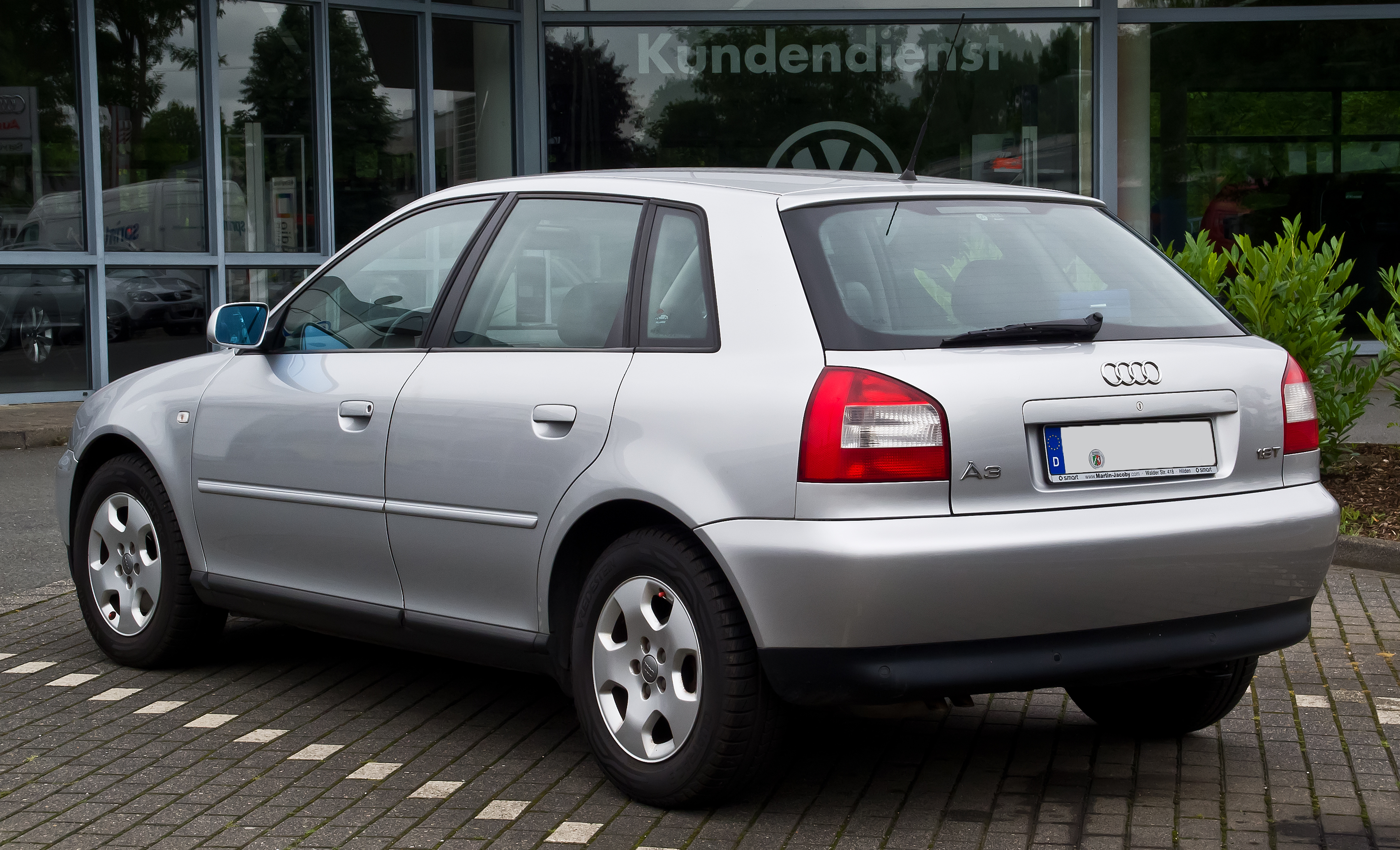
Audi A3 5-door (post-facelift)

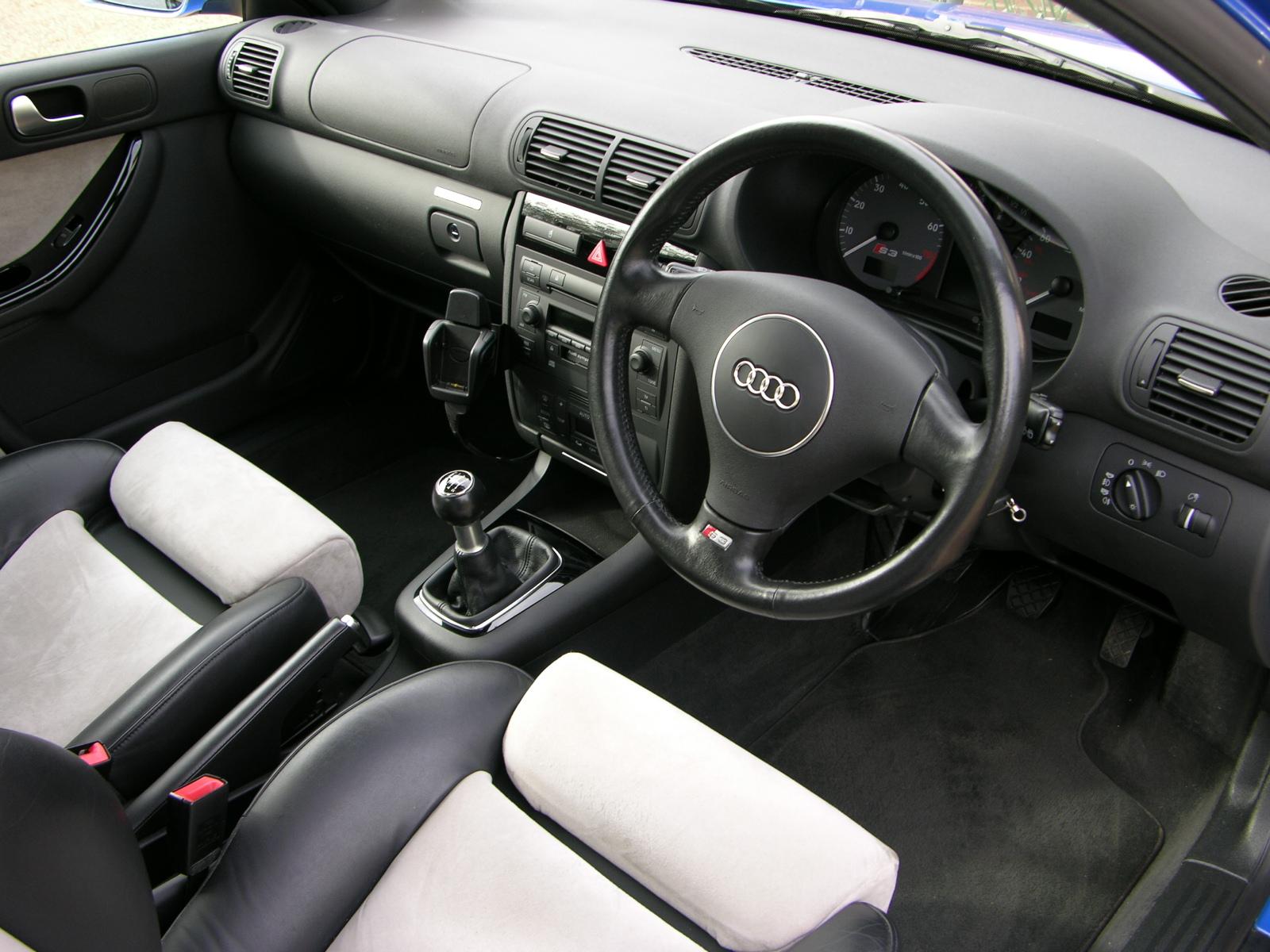
Interior

=== Safety ===
ANCAP test results* Audi A3 3 door hatch (2004)
Test	Score
Overall	4 /5 stars
Frontal offset	11.77/16
Side impact	15.53/16
Pole	2/2
Seat belt reminders	0/3
Whiplash protection	Not Assessed
Pedestrian protection	Poor
Electronic stability control	Standard

Euro NCAP test results* Audi A3, 3dr hatchback (1998)
Test	Score	Rating
Adult occupant:	25	4 /5 stars
Pedestrian:	12	2 /4 stars

The first generation A3 received a Euro NCAP rating of 4 out of 5 stars. Their evaluation concluded "the column lock, adjuster lever and bracket presented hazards in the knee impact area for the driver. These could cause high loads on his upper legs and damage to his knees." The A3 also provided minimal protection for pedestrians, and received two stars out of a possible four.

=== S3 (1999–2003) ===
Audi released the A3-derived S3 in 1999. Only available as a three-door hatchback, the S3 was powered by a turbocharged 1.8 L 20v inline four-cylinder. Early models (1999–2001) produced 210 PS (154 kW; 207 hp), with later models (2001–2003) receiving variable valve timing which increased output to 225 PS (165 kW; 222 hp). The engine had a maximum torque output of 280 N⋅m (207 ft⋅lbf). The S3 was the first Audi S-series car to utilise a smaller four-cylinder engine.

The S3's quattro system utilises a Haldex Traction coupling to adjust the bias of torque distribution from the front to rear axle as grip requirements change. Due to this, the S3 typically operates in front-wheel-drive in most conditions.

The S3 was sold in Europe, Japan, Mexico, South Africa, Australia, and New Zealand.

In 2002, the S3 received a facelift, receiving revised front wings, rear lights clusters, single-piece headlight and indicator units, and minor interior trim updates.

Standard features include xenon HID headlamps with high pressure washers and auto levelers, front fog lamps, 17-inch "Avus" alloy wheels with 225/45R17 tyres, electrically adjustable Recaro leather seats, climate control, an alarm and electronic stability control with traction control.

Options include a Bose sound system, boot/trunk or in-dash mounted 6-disc CD changer, metallic paint, 18-inch 9-spoke RSTT wheels, glass sunroof, centre arm rest, privacy glass (B-pillar backwards), auto-dimming rear-view mirror, parking assist, luggage net, heated front seats, cruise control, aluminium door mirror casings and part leather/Alcantara (blue/silver/yellow) combination seat coverings. Some of these items are standard in certain export markets.

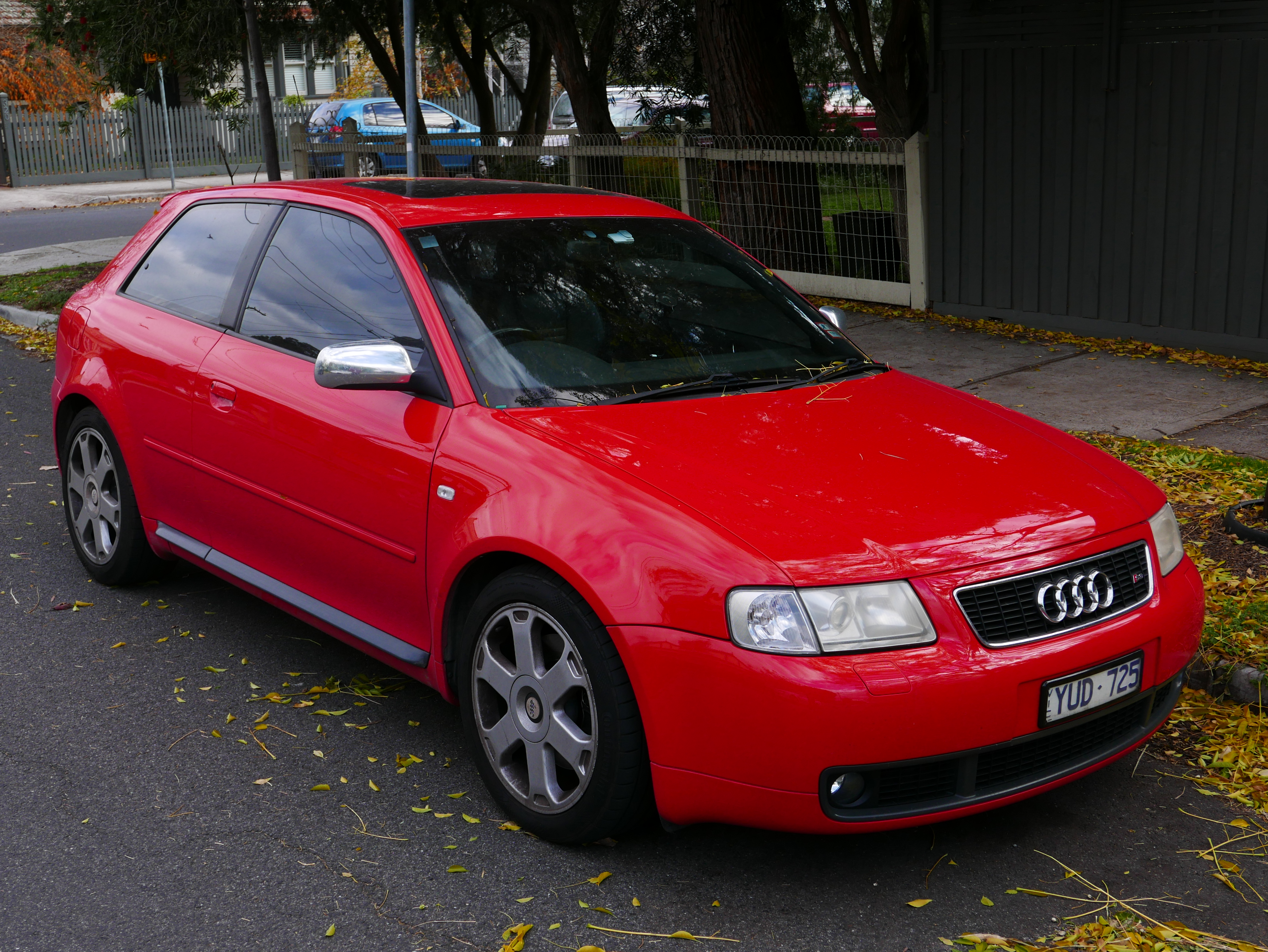
Audi S3 front view (8L; pre-facelift)

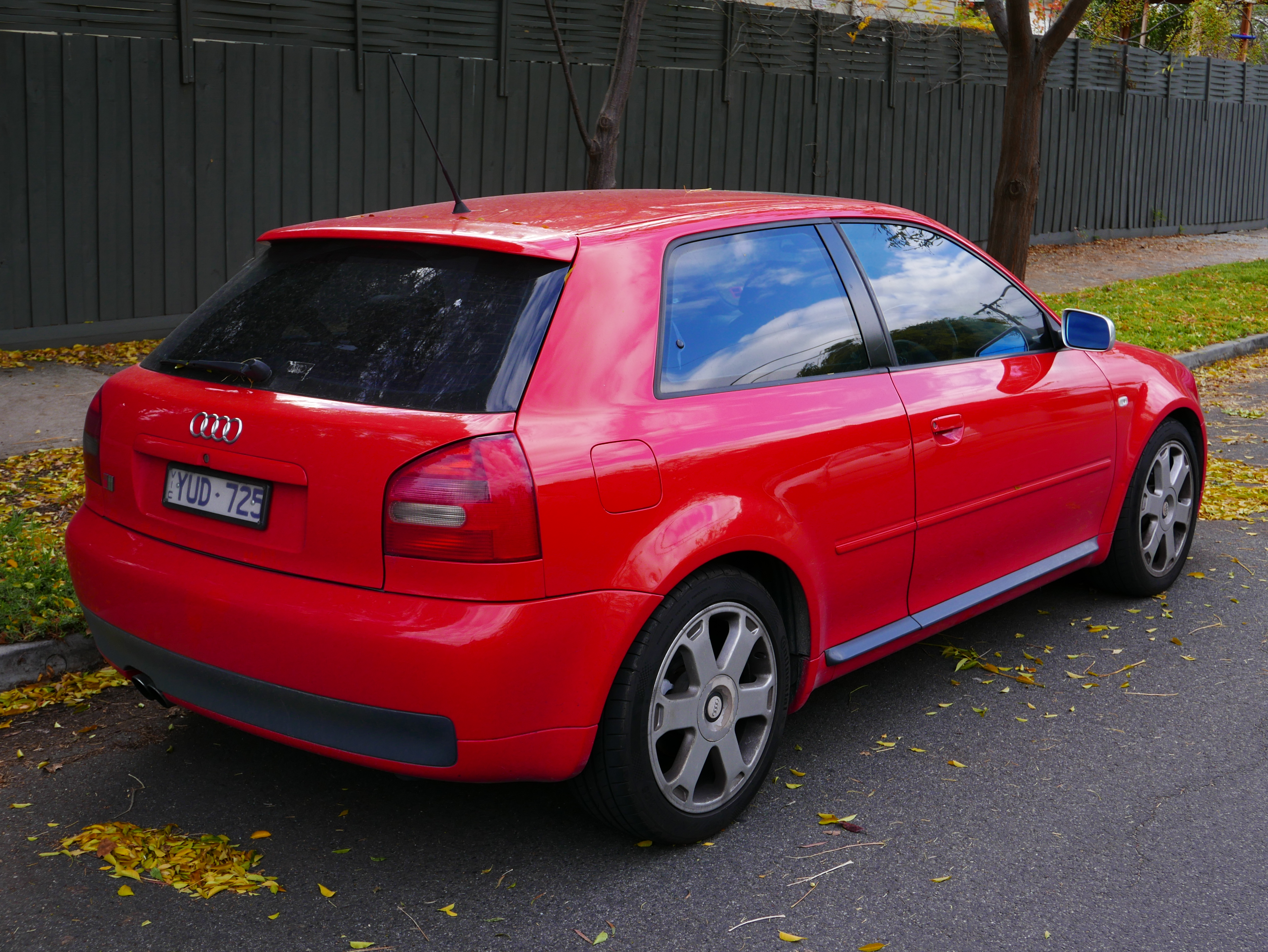
Audi S3 rear view (8L; pre-facelift)

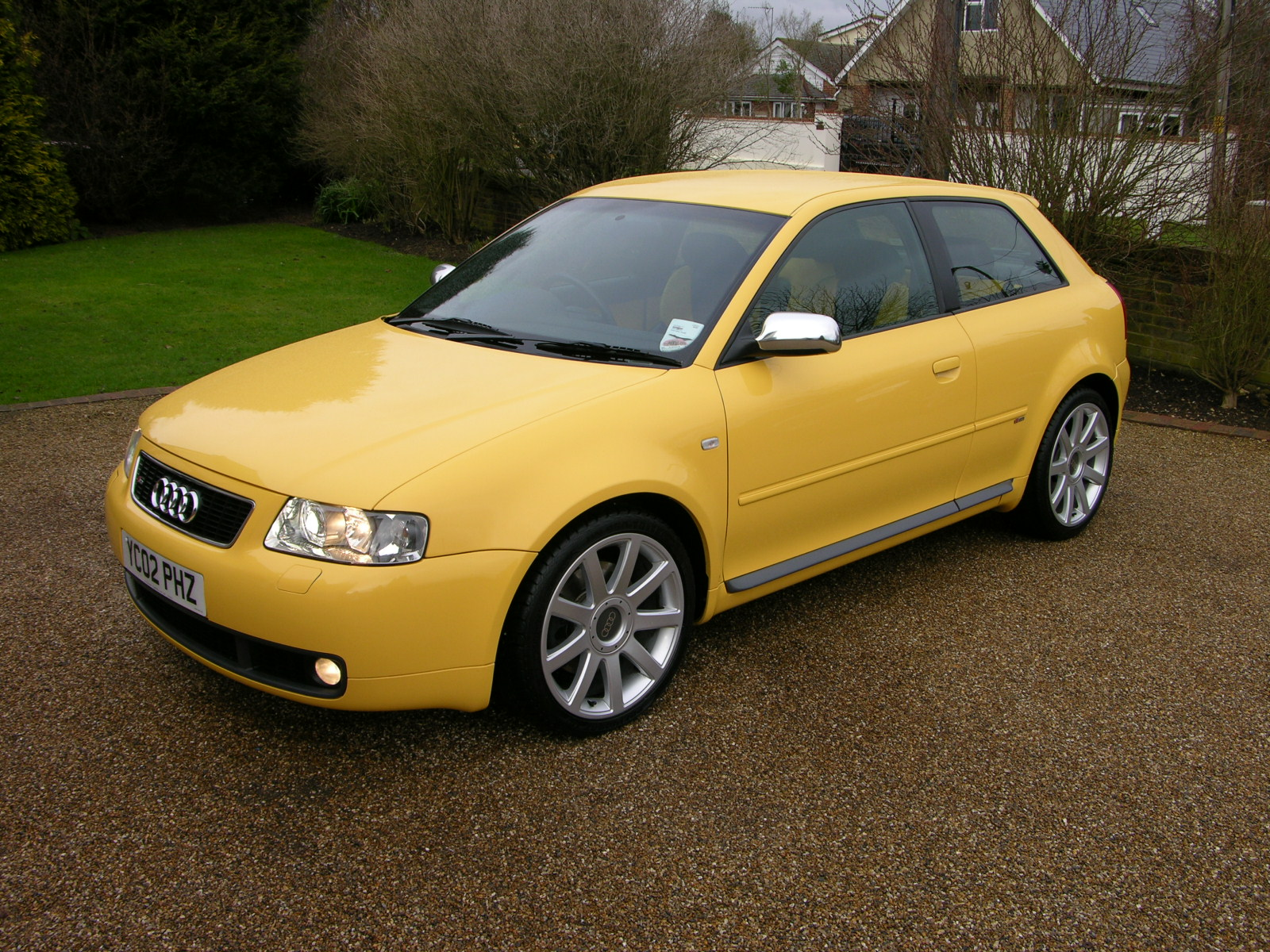
Audi S3 front view (8L; facelift)

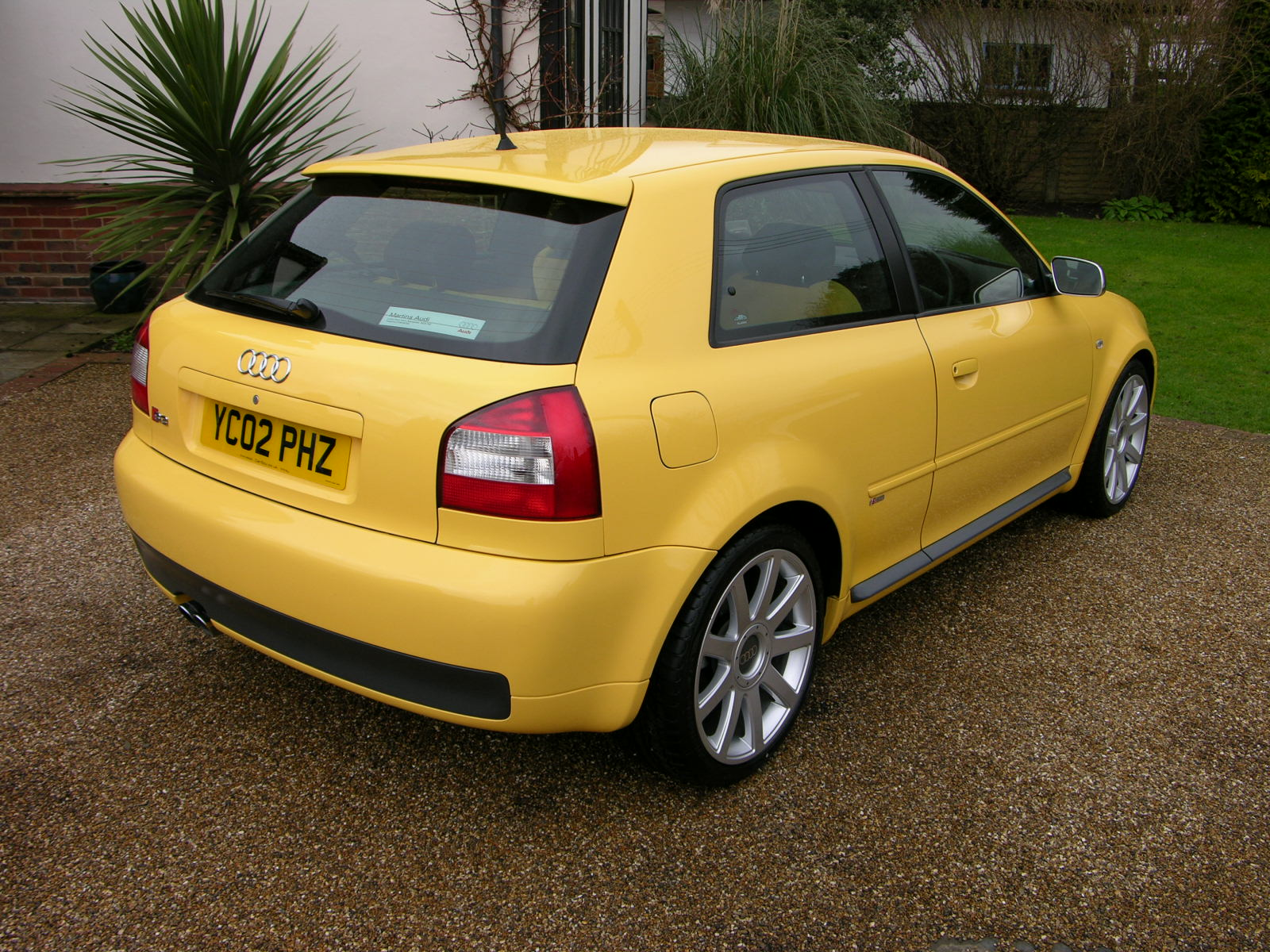
Audi S3 rear view (8L; facelift)

=== Engines ===
The engines used in the Typ 8L range are also used in a range of other Volkswagen Group vehicles.

Name	Type	Engine code	Output at rpm	Torque at rpm	0–100 km/h (0–62 mph) time	Top speed	Years
Petrol engines
1.6 8v	1,595 cc (97 cu in) I4	AEH/AKL/APF	101 PS (74 kW; 100 hp) at 5,600 rpm	145 N⋅m (107 lb⋅ft) at 3,800 rpm	11.0 s	188 km/h (117 mph)	1996–2000
1.6 8v	1,595 cc (97 cu in) I4	AVU/BFQ	102 PS (75 kW; 101 hp) at 5,600 rpm	148 N⋅m (109 lb⋅ft) at 3,800 rpm	10.9 s	189 km/h (117 mph)	2000–2003
1.8 20v	1,781 cc (109 cu in) I4	AGN/APG	125 PS (92 kW; 123 hp) at 6,000 rpm	170 N⋅m (125 lb⋅ft) at 4,200 rpm	9.6 s	202 km/h (126 mph)	1996–2003
1.8 20vT	1,781 cc (109 cu in) I4 turbo	AGU/ARZ/ARX/AUM	150 PS (110 kW; 148 hp) at 5,700 rpm	210 N⋅m (155 lb⋅ft) at 1,750–4,600 rpm	8.2 s	217 km/h (135 mph)	1996–2003
1.8 20vT	1,781 cc (109 cu in) I4 turbo	AJQ/APP/ARY/AUQ	180 PS (132 kW; 178 hp) at 5,500 rpm	235 N⋅m (173 lb⋅ft) at 1,950–5,000 rpm	7.5 s	228 km/h (142 mph)	1999–2003
1.8 20vT (S3)	1,781 cc (109 cu in) I4 turbo	APY, AMK	210 PS (154 kW; 207 hp) at 5,800 rpm	270 N⋅m (199 lb⋅ft) at 2,100 rpm	6.8 s	238 km/h (148 mph)	1999–2001
1.8 20vT (S3)	1,781 cc (109 cu in) I4 turbo	BAM	225 PS (165 kW; 222 hp) at 5,900 rpm	280 N⋅m (207 lb⋅ft) at 2,200 rpm	6.6 s	243 km/h (151 mph)	2001–2003
Diesel engines
1.9 8v TDI	1,896 cc (116 cu in) I4 turbo	AGR/ALH	90 PS (66 kW; 89 hp) at 4,000 rpm	210 N⋅m (155 lb⋅ft) at 1,900 rpm	12.4 s	181 km/h (112 mph)	1996–2001
1.9 8v TDI	1,896 cc (116 cu in) I4 turbo	ATD/AXR	100 PS (74 kW; 99 hp) at 4,000 rpm	240 N⋅m (177 lb⋅ft) at 1,800–2,400 rpm	11.0 s	188 km/h (117 mph)	2001–2003
1.9 8v TDI	1,896 cc (116 cu in) I4 turbo	AHF/ASV	110 PS (81 kW; 108 hp) at 4,150 rpm	235 N⋅m (173 lb⋅ft) at 1,900 rpm	10.5 s	194 km/h (121 mph)	1997–2000
1.9 8v TDI	1,896 cc (116 cu in) I4 turbo	ASZ	130 PS (96 kW; 128 hp) at 4,000 rpm	310 N⋅m (229 lb⋅ft) at 1,900 rpm	9.2 s	205 km/h (127 mph)	2000–2003

== Second generation (Typ 8P; 2003) ==
Second generation
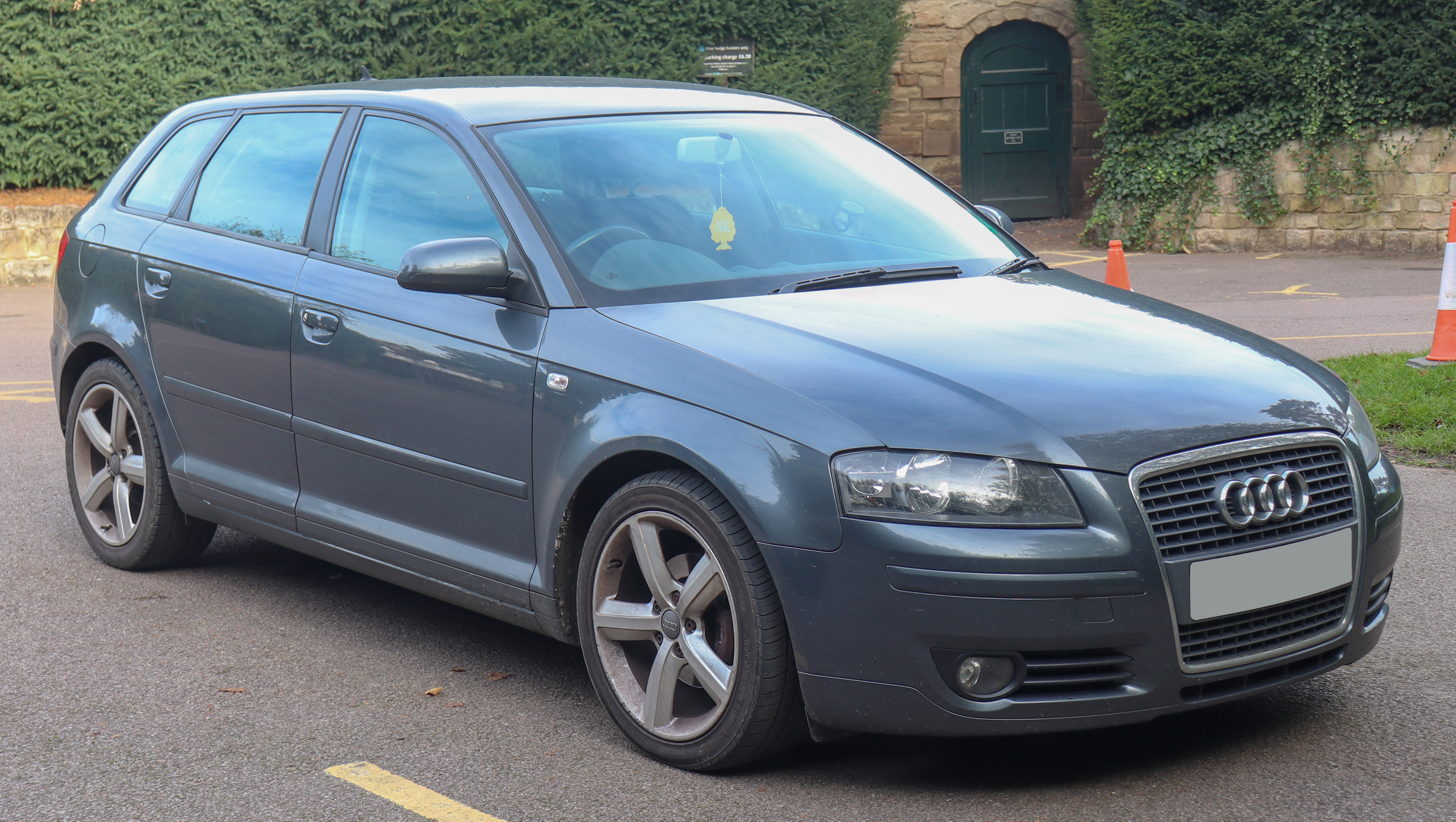
- 2005–2008 Audi A3 Sportback

Overview
- Model code: 8P
- Production: 2003–2013
- Model years: 2004–2013
- Assembly: Germany: Ingolstadt; Belgium: Brussels (2004–2005; 2007–May 2010); Hungary: Győr; Brazil: Curitiba (Volkswagen do Brasil, CKD; 12/2012 – 03/2013)
- Designer: Gary Telaak (2000)

Body and chassis
- Body style: 3-door hatchback 5-door Sportback (hatchback); 2-door convertible
- Platform: Volkswagen Group A5 (PQ35)
- Related: Volkswagen Golf Mk5; SEAT León Mk2; Volkswagen Gran Lavida

Powertrain
- Engine: Inline-four petrol engine: 1.2 L I4 Turbo FSI (TFSI); 1.4 L I4 Turbo FSI (TFSI); 1.6 L I4; 1.6 L I4 FSI; 1.8 L I4 TFSI; 2.0 L I4 FSI; 2.0 L I4 TFSI; Straight-five petrol engine: 2.5 L I5 TFSI; VR6 engine: 3.2 L VR6 (petrol); Inline-four diesel engine: 1.6 L I4 TDI; 1.9 L I4 TDI; 2.0 L I4 TDI
- Transmission: Manual transmission: 5-speed manual; 6-speed manual; Automatic transmission: 6-speed automatic; Dual-clutch automatic transmission: 6-speed S-Tronic; 7-speed S-Tronic

Dimensions
- Wheelbase: 2,578 mm (101.5 in)
- Length: 3-door: 4,215 mm (165.9 in); 5-door: 4,285 mm (168.7 in)
- Width: 1,765 mm (69.5 in)
- Height: 1,420 mm (55.9 in)

=== Initial release ===
At the 2003 Geneva Motor Show, Audi launched the second generation of the A3, the Typ 8P, designed by Gary Telaak during 2000 (however, the final design was frozen in 2001). Originally launched only as a three-door hatchback with four-cylinder engines, it featured a new automobile platform (the PQ35 platform), a redesigned and more spacious interior, new petrol engines with Fuel Stratified Injection (FSI), and standard six-speed manual gearboxes (except on the base 1.6 petrol and 1.9 diesel).

In mid-2003 the line was updated with two sports-oriented models, a 2.0 Turbo-FSI version rated 200 PS (147 kW; 197 hp), and a 3.2 L VR6 engine (for the first time) with 250 PS (184 kW; 247 hp). Haldex Traction-based quattro on-demand four-wheel drive, and the S-Tronic semi-auto gearbox were introduced as options (quattro is standard on the VR6) on models with engines over 140 PS (103 kW; 138 hp).

In 2005 the "S line" trim level, offering new decorative elements became available and the three-door A3 received the same front-end styling features as the Sportback model. For the first time, the A3 became available in the North American market, exclusively with the Sportback body, with the base 2.0 inline-four FSI introduced in 2005 as a 2006 model and the 3.2 VR6 Quattro following.

Chassis codes	8P1	8PA	8P7
Body type	3-door hatchback coupé	5-door Sportback	Cabriolet
Years	2003–2013	2004–2013	2008–2013

==== A3 Sportback (2004–2013) ====
The five-door "Sportback" model was introduced in June 2004. The A3 Sportback is 80 mm (3.1 in) longer than the base three-door body, and includes improved rear cabin space and a larger luggage compartment (370 litres). It also received the new "single frame" front grille originally introduced in the A8 W12, which was later adopted across the whole A3 range.

==== S3 (2006–2013) ====
In August 2006, Audi introduced the second generation S3. Offered in three and five-door body styles, the second generation—Typ 8P—S3 is powered by a modified and updated Volkswagen Group-sourced 2.0-litre turbocharged FSI petrol engine, with a maximum output of 195 kW (265 PS; 261 bhp). As with all Audi S models, the design was done in-house by quattro GmbH. The engine features uprated high-performance pistons, revised boost/fuel mapping, increased turbocharger size (KKK K04) and larger intercooler. The most powerful form of this engine, and quattro four-wheel drive, makes for a 0–100 km/h (0–62 mph) time of 5.7 seconds, and an electronically limited top speed of 250 km/h (155 mph). Audi offers both six-speed manual and six-speed S-Tronic automatic transmissions with the S3.

The spring ratings and dampers were revised, along with the body kit. Like its predecessor, although badged a "Quattro" model, the S3 does not employ a Torsen centre differential (as in other common Quattro models), but instead uses the Swedish Haldex Traction system in its on-demand four-wheel drive transmission, due to the transverse engine layout.

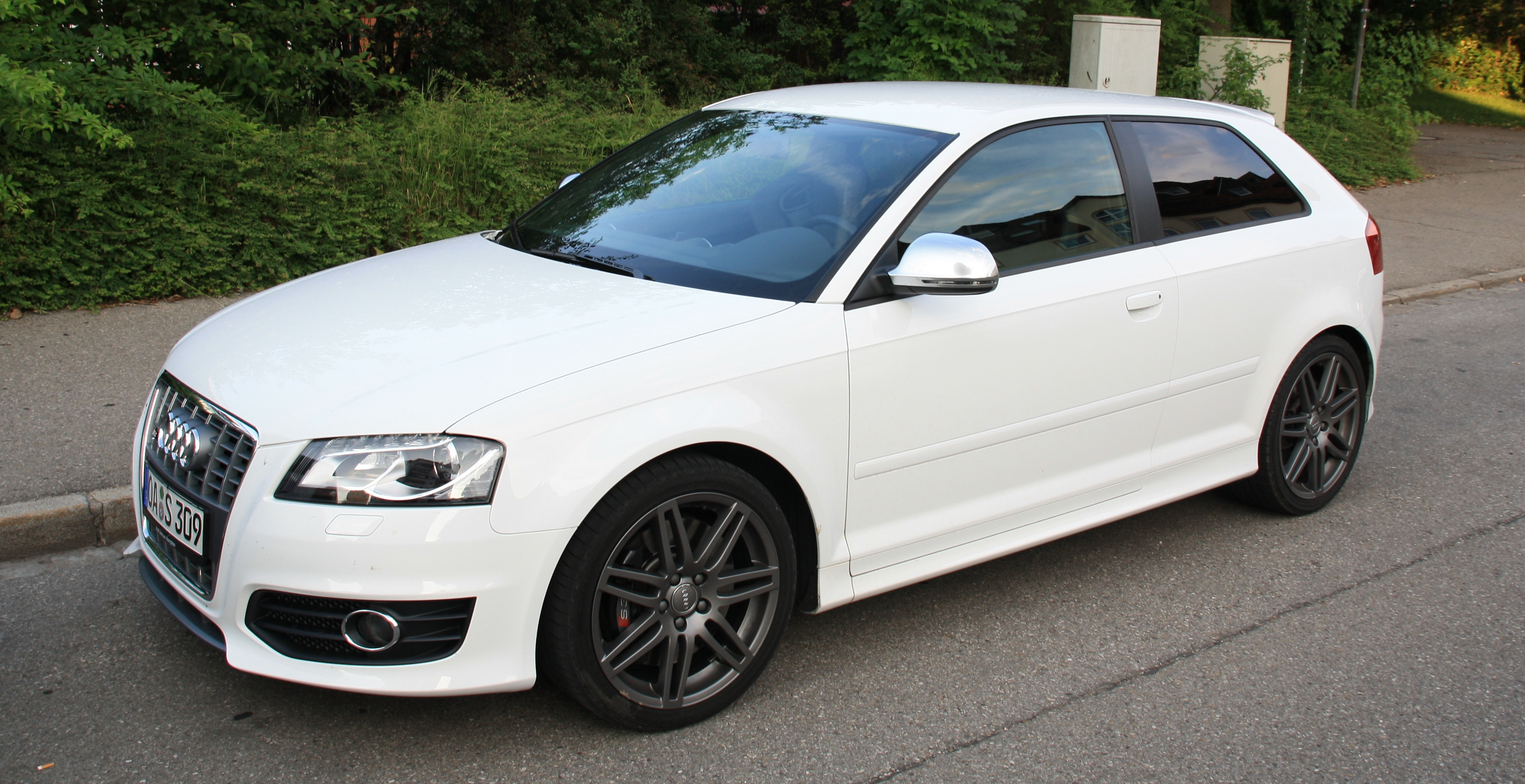
Audi S3 front view (8P; facelift)

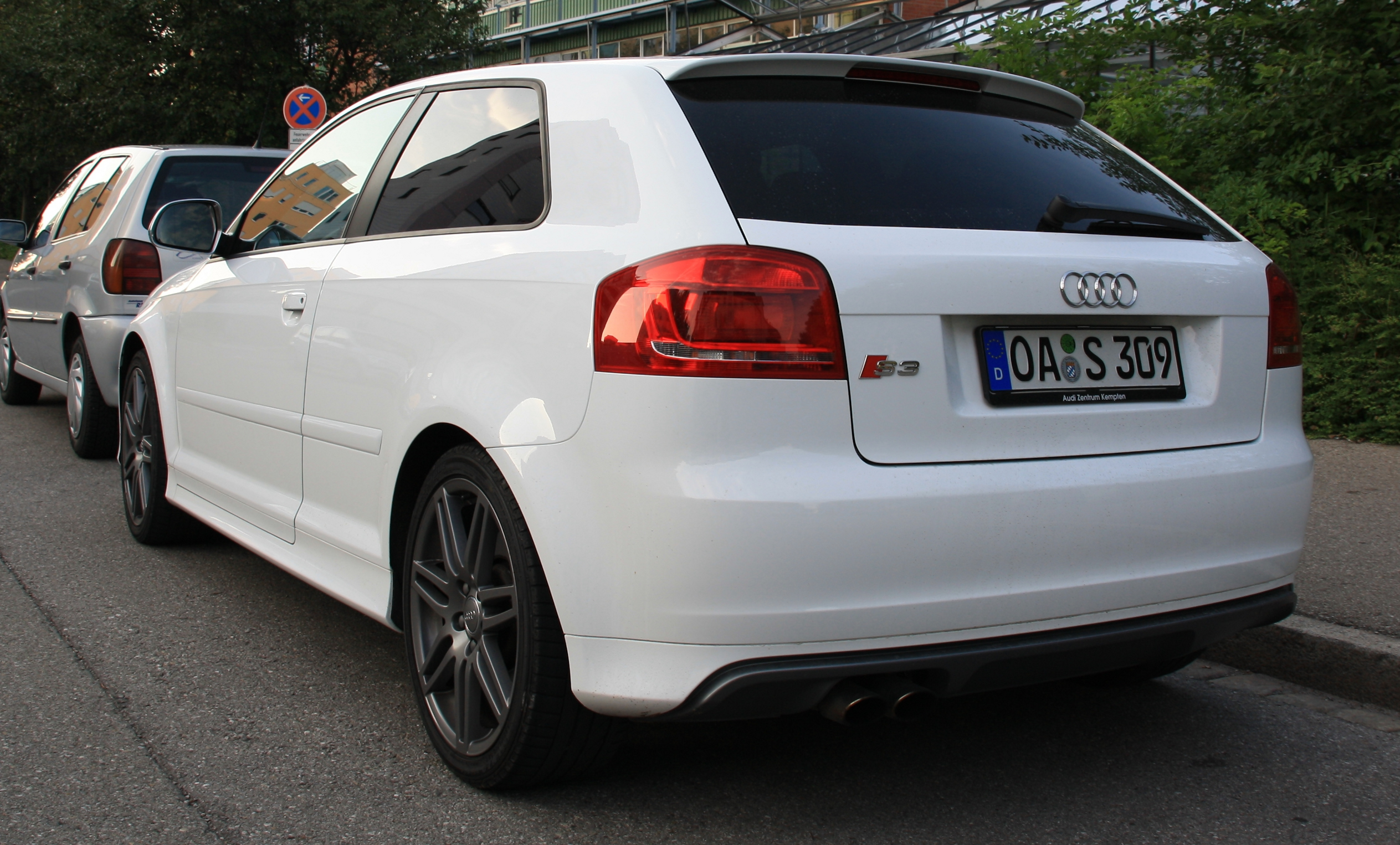
Audi S3 rear view (8P; facelift)

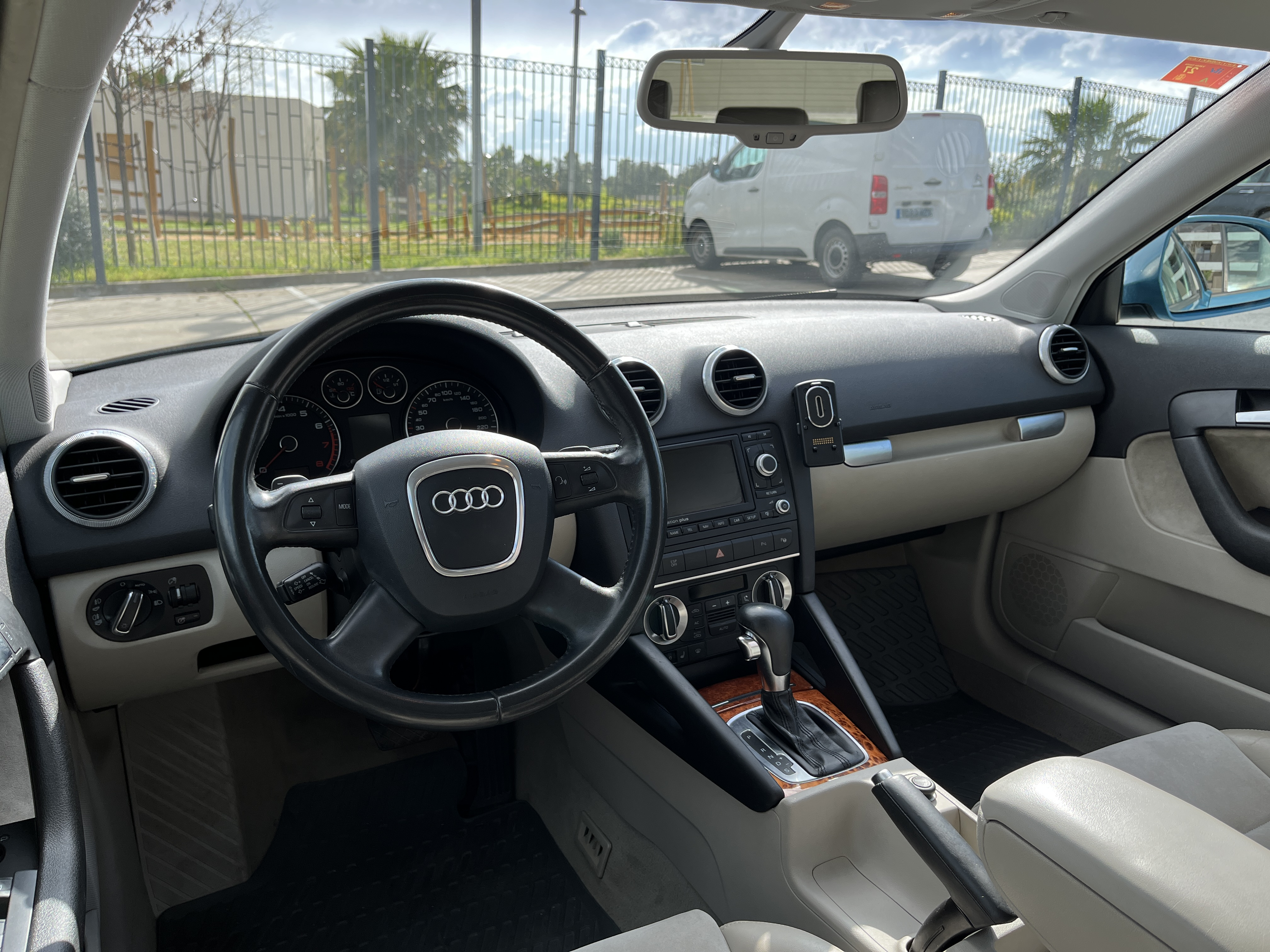
Audi A3 inside view

==== Safety ====
ANCAP test results* Audi A3 (2013)
Test	Score
Overall	5 /5 stars
Frontal offset	15.41/16
Side impact	16/16
Pole	2/2
Seat belt reminders	3/3
Whiplash protection	Good
Pedestrian protection	Adequate
Electronic stability control	Standard

Euro NCAP test results* Audi A3, RHD 3-dr hatchback (2003)
Test	Score	Rating
Adult occupant:	29	4 /5 stars
Child occupant:	35	3 /5 stars
Pedestrian:	8	1 /4 stars

Euro NCAP tested a second-generation Audi A3 with front airbags, side airbags, seatbelt pretensioners, and load limiters as standard. Despite Audi increasing the protection inside the car for the driver and passengers, pedestrian safety actually decreased by a third compared to the first generation; Euro NCAP criticised the car for offering virtually no protection at all on the front end, giving it one star from a possible four. "A poor result for a new car" was the verdict given for pedestrian safety after the test.

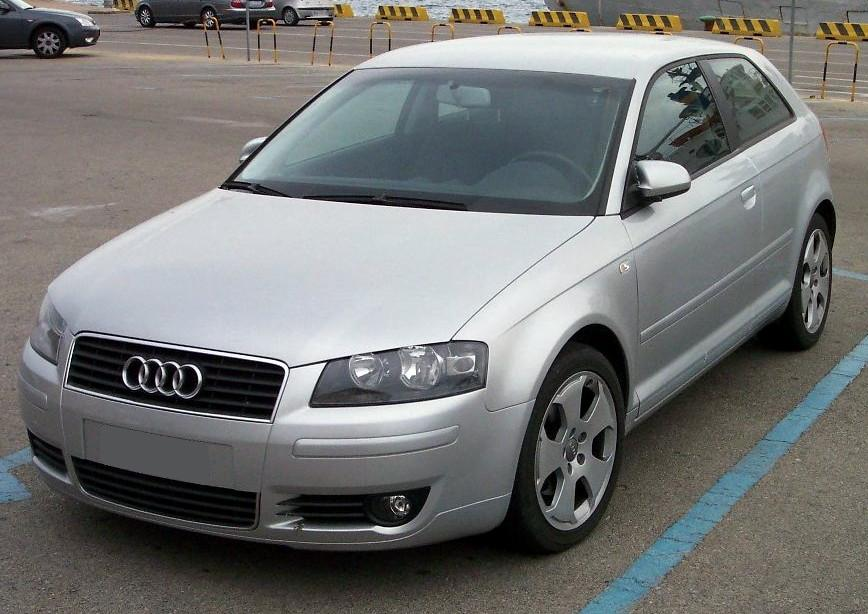
2003–2005 Audi A3 3-door

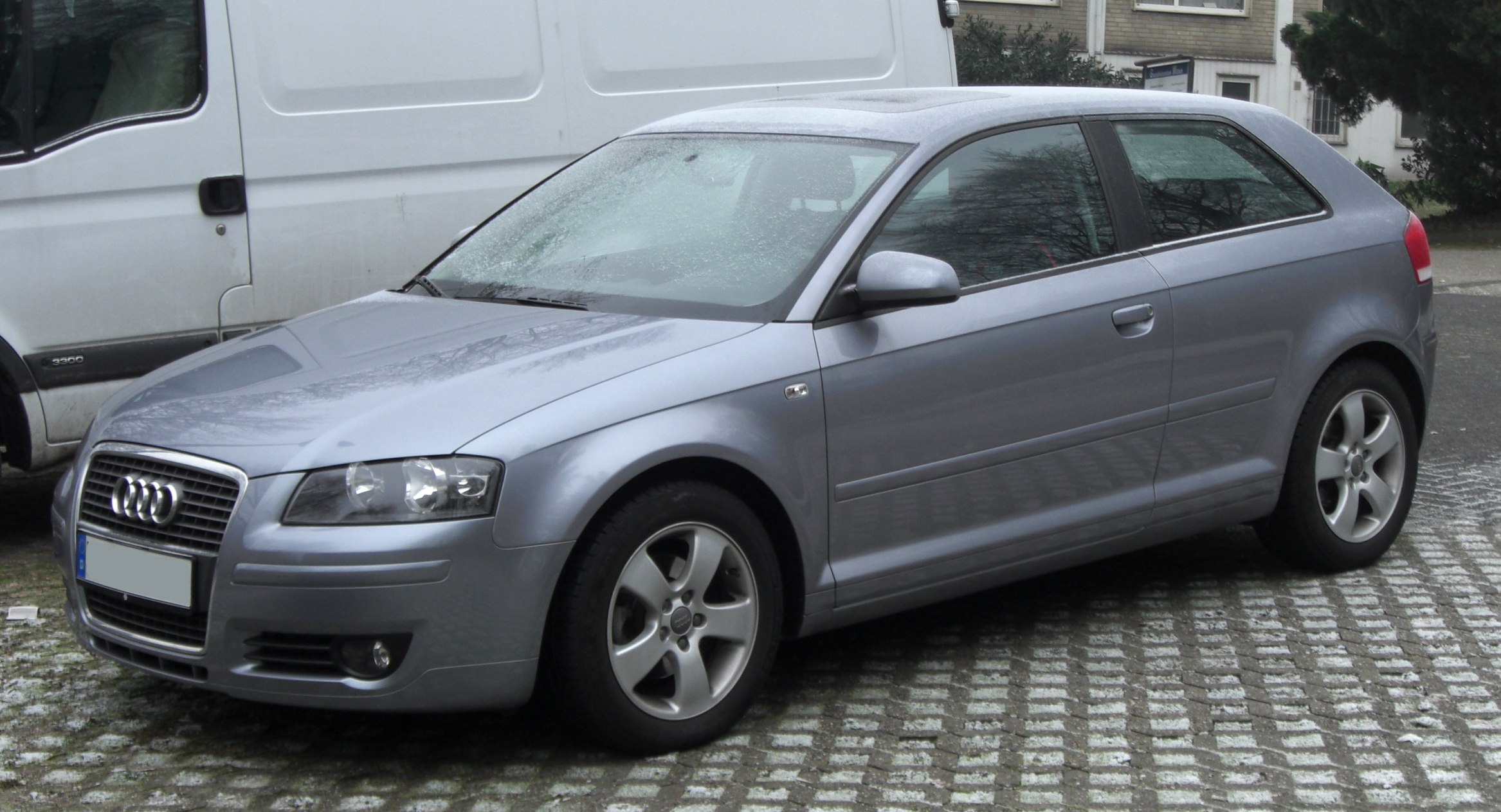
2005–2008 Audi A3 3-door

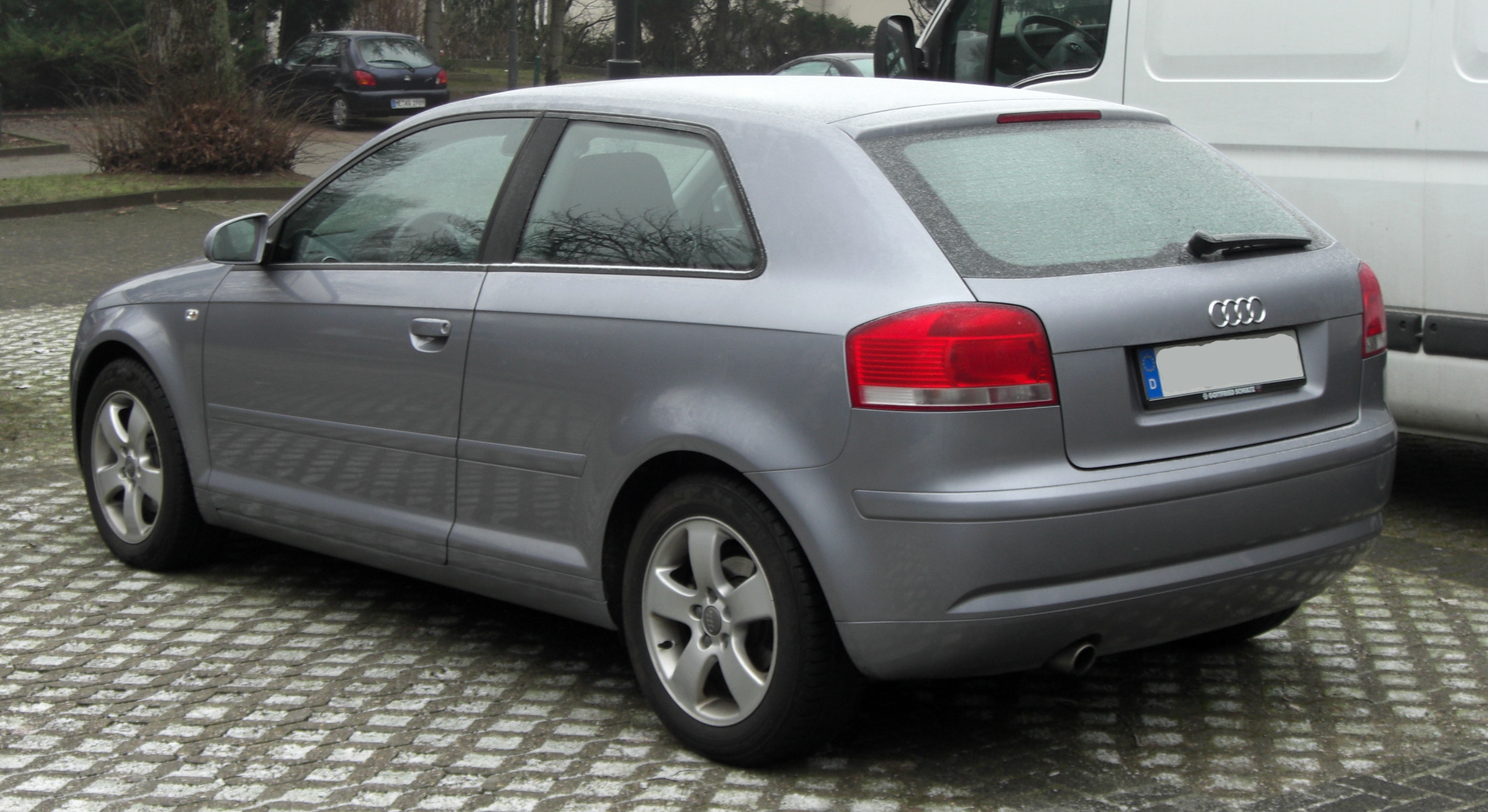
2005–2008 Audi A3 3-door

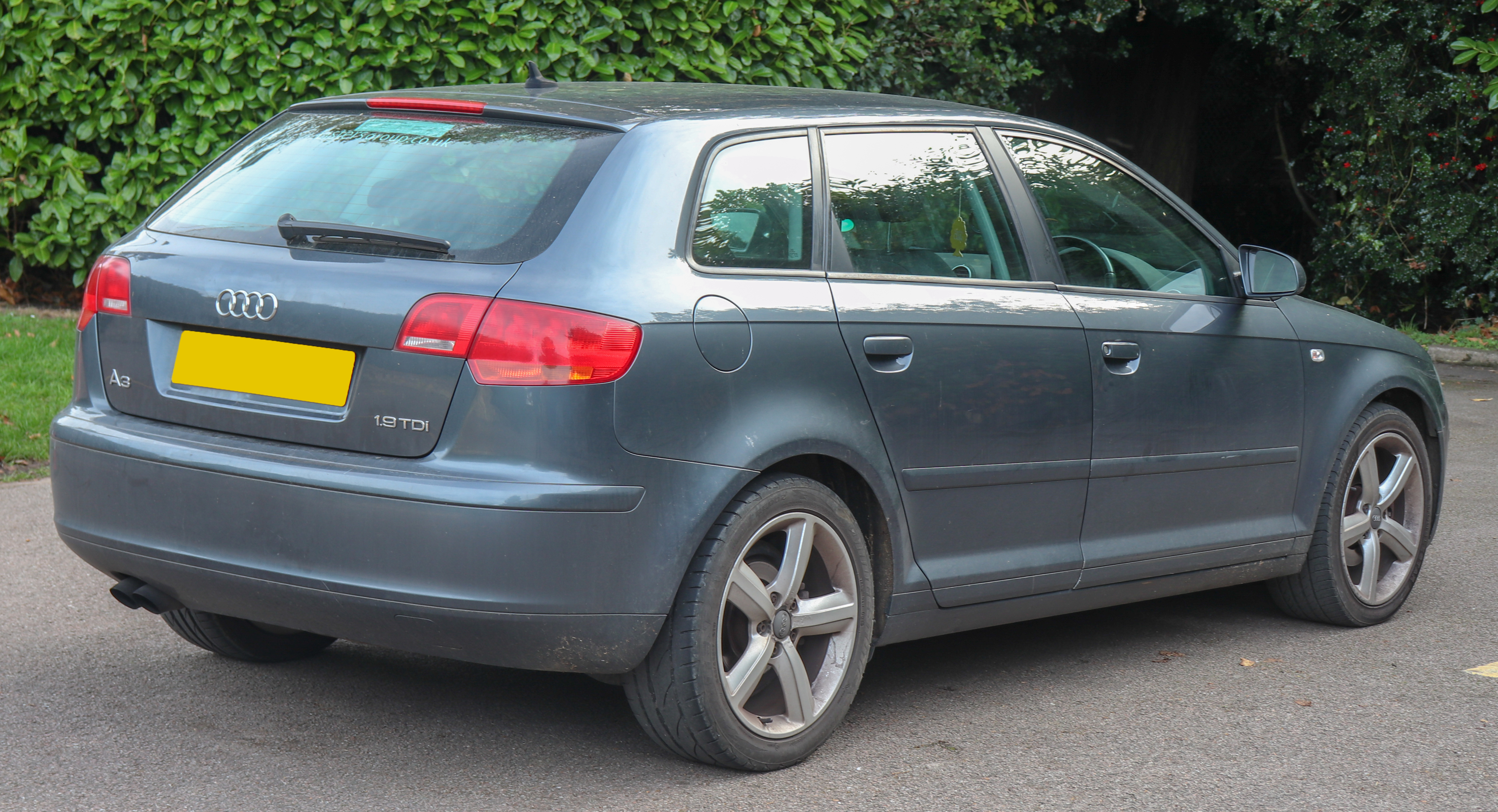
2005–2008 Audi A3 Sportback

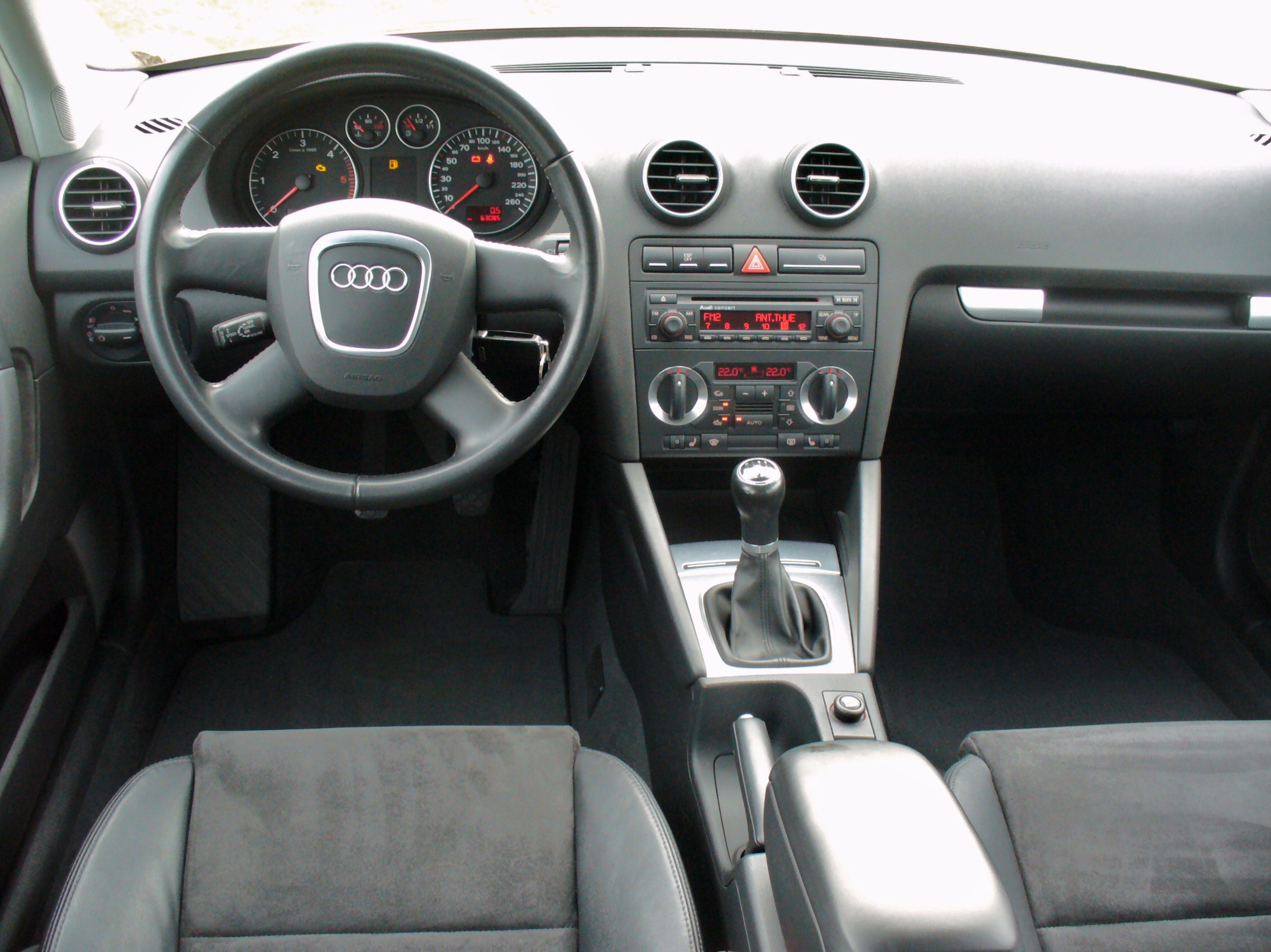
Interior (Sportback)

=== 2008 facelift ===
Audi introduced a number of changes to the A3 and S3 in 2008. These include revised nose and tail styling, with a modified grille and daytime running lights, common rail 2.0 TDI engines, seven-speed S tronic dual clutch transmission availability for the smaller non-U.S. engines, and optional "magnetic ride" adaptive shock absorbers. In addition, the range includes an S3 Sportback model.

Also, a cabriolet version was introduced. It was similar in dimensions to the 3-door version, with a two-box design.

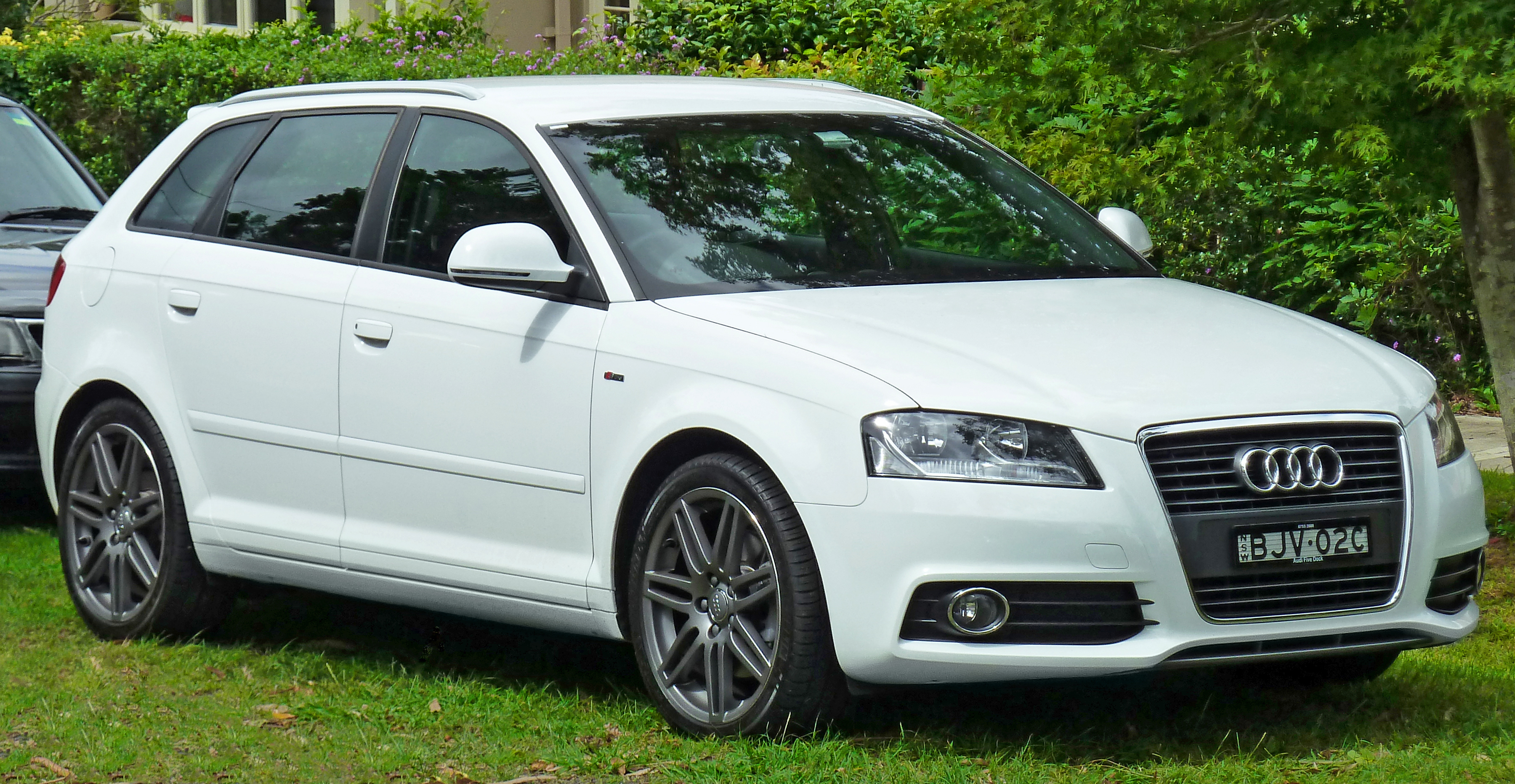
2008–2010 Audi A3 Sportback

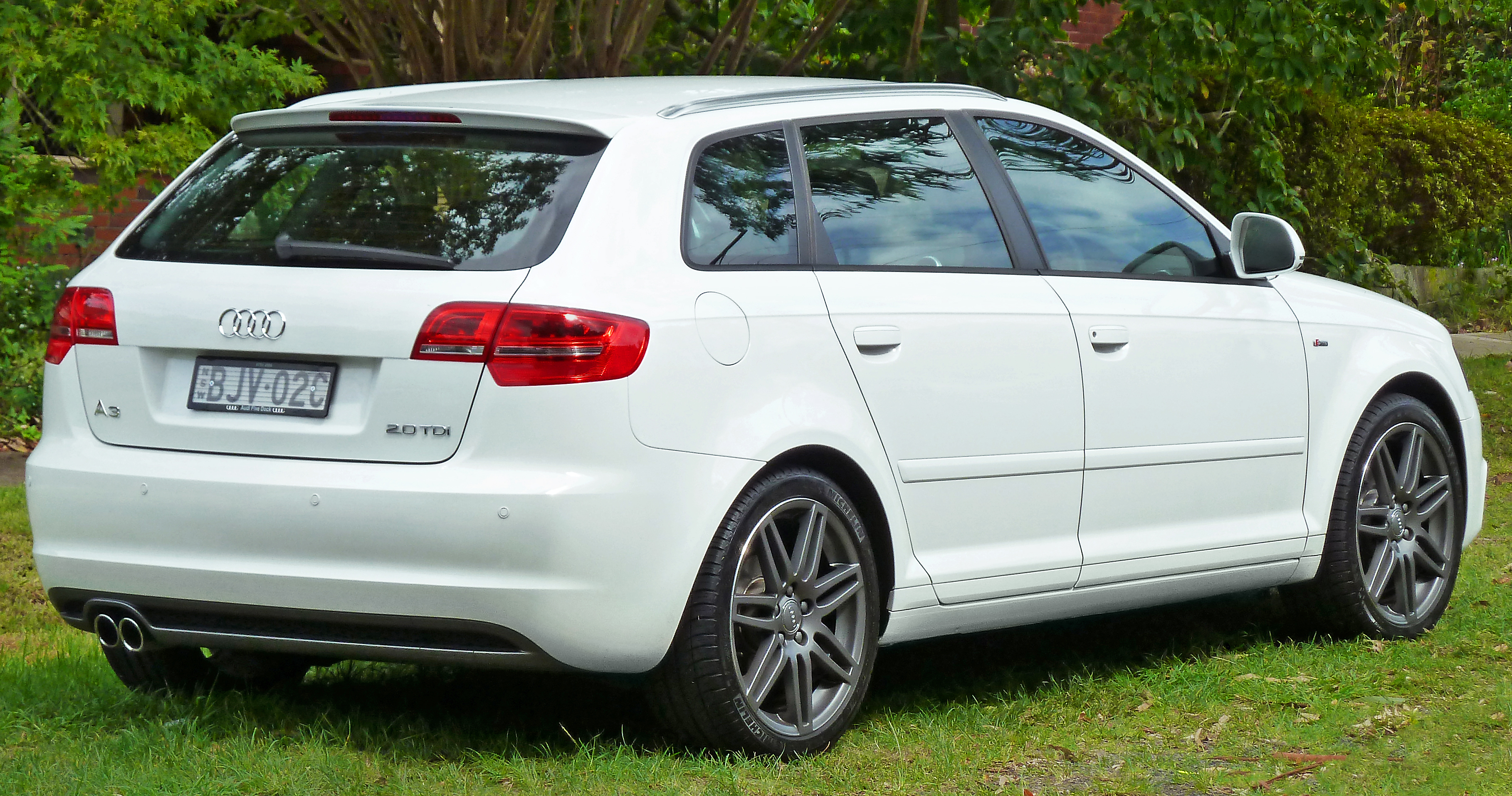
2008–2010 Audi A3 Sportback

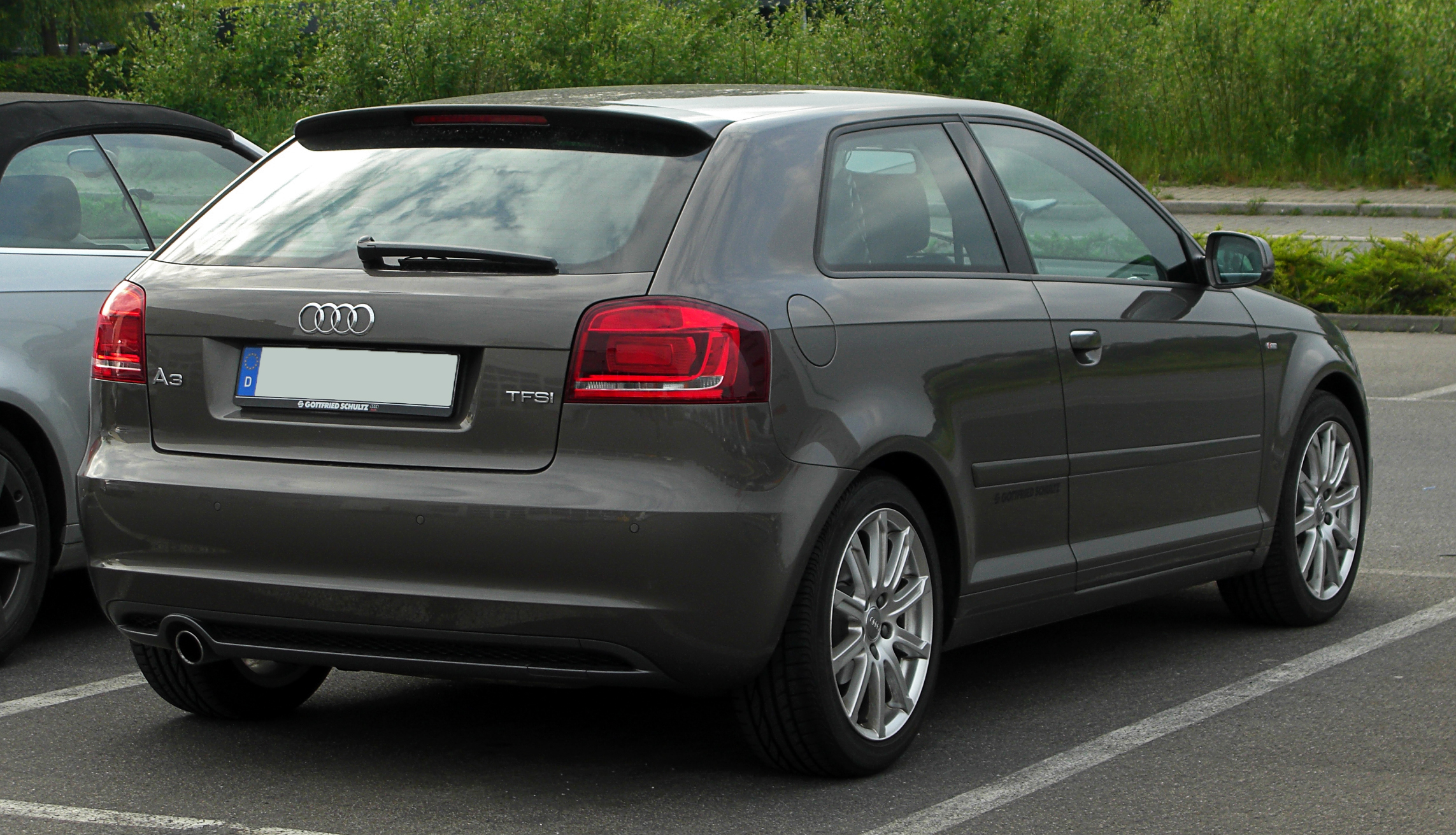
2008–2010 Audi A3 3-door

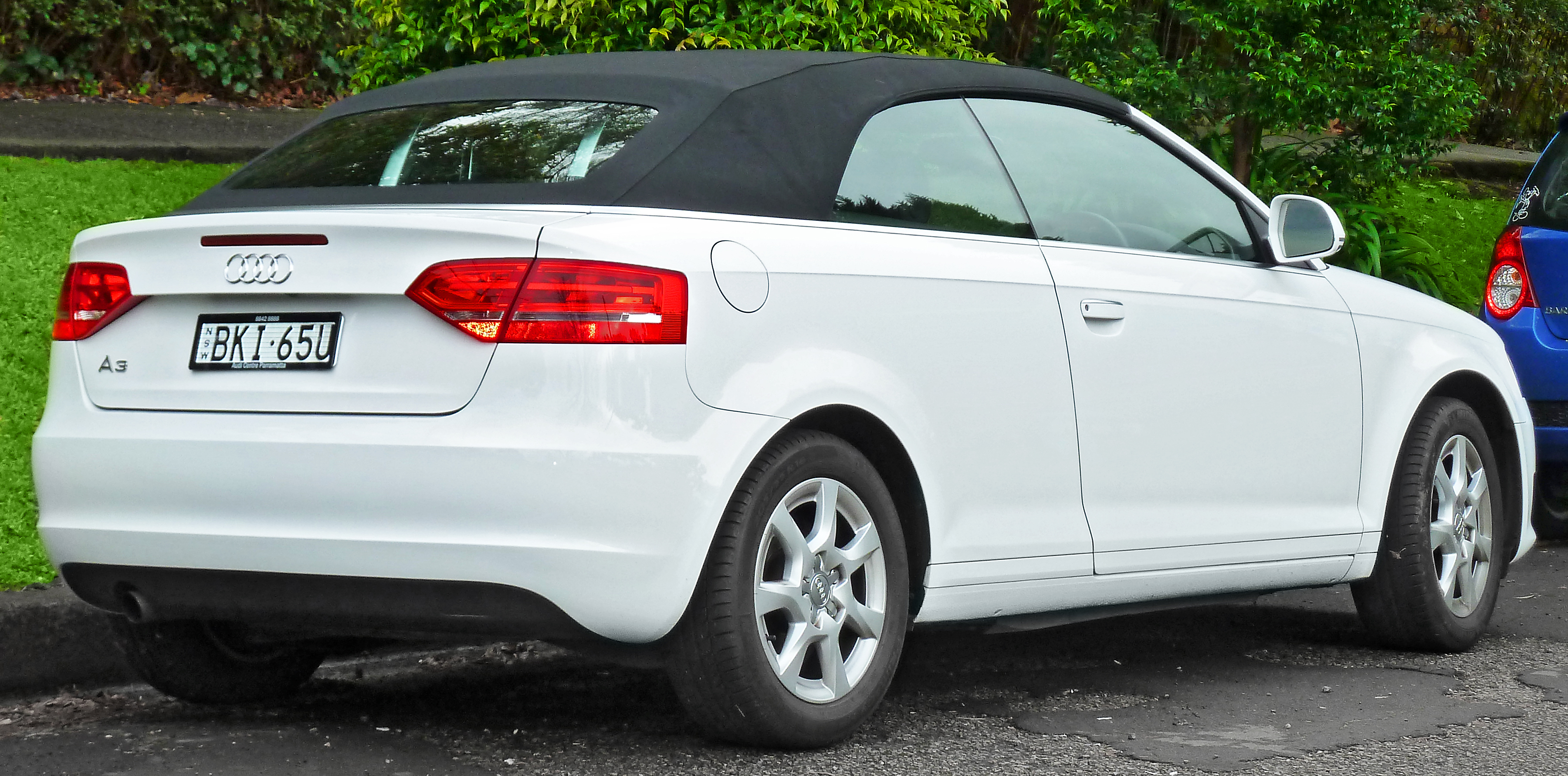
2008–2010 Audi A3 cabriolet

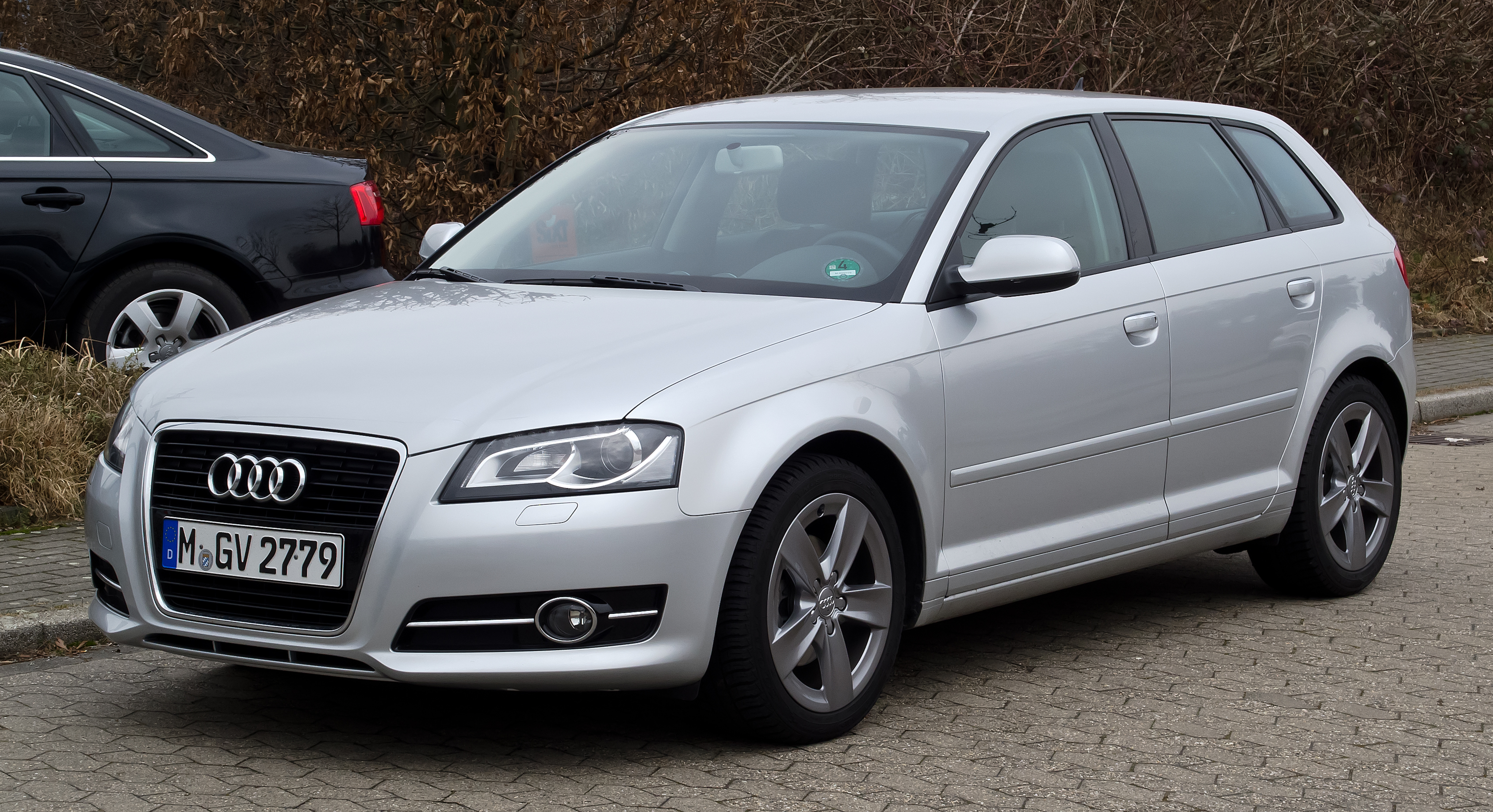
2010–2013 Audi A3 Sportback

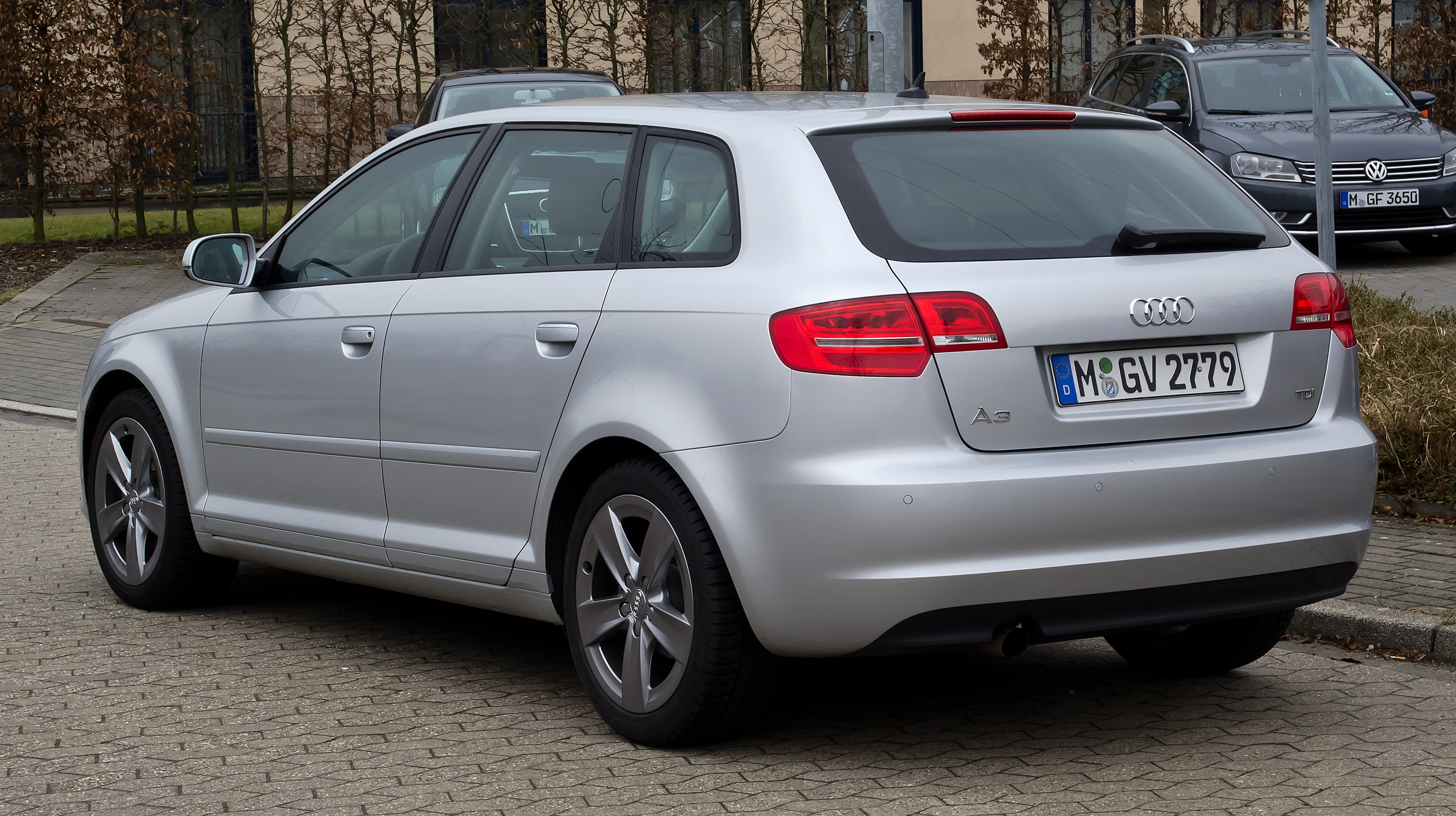
2010–2013 Audi A3 Sportback

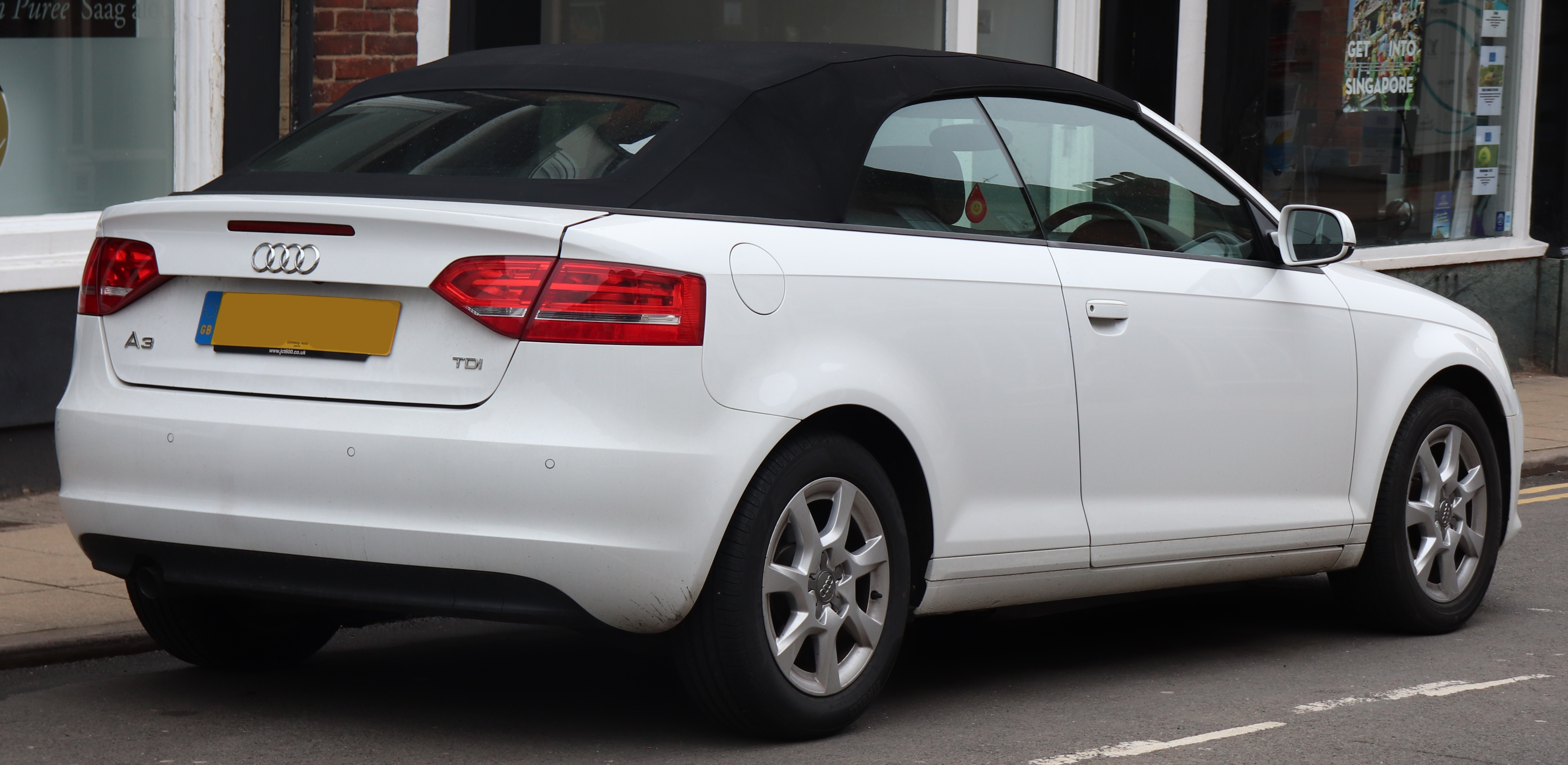
2010-2012 Audi A3 cabriolet

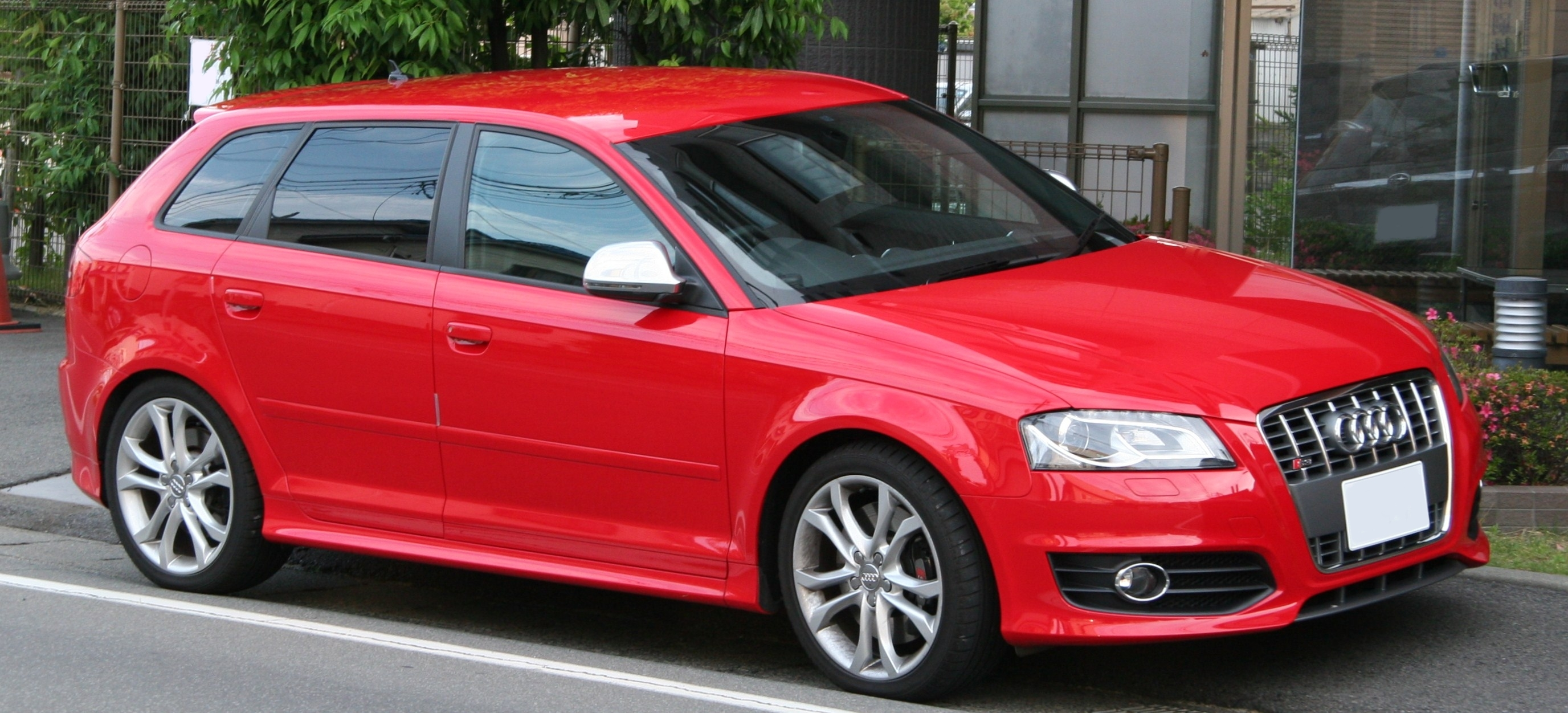
2010 Audi S3 Sportback

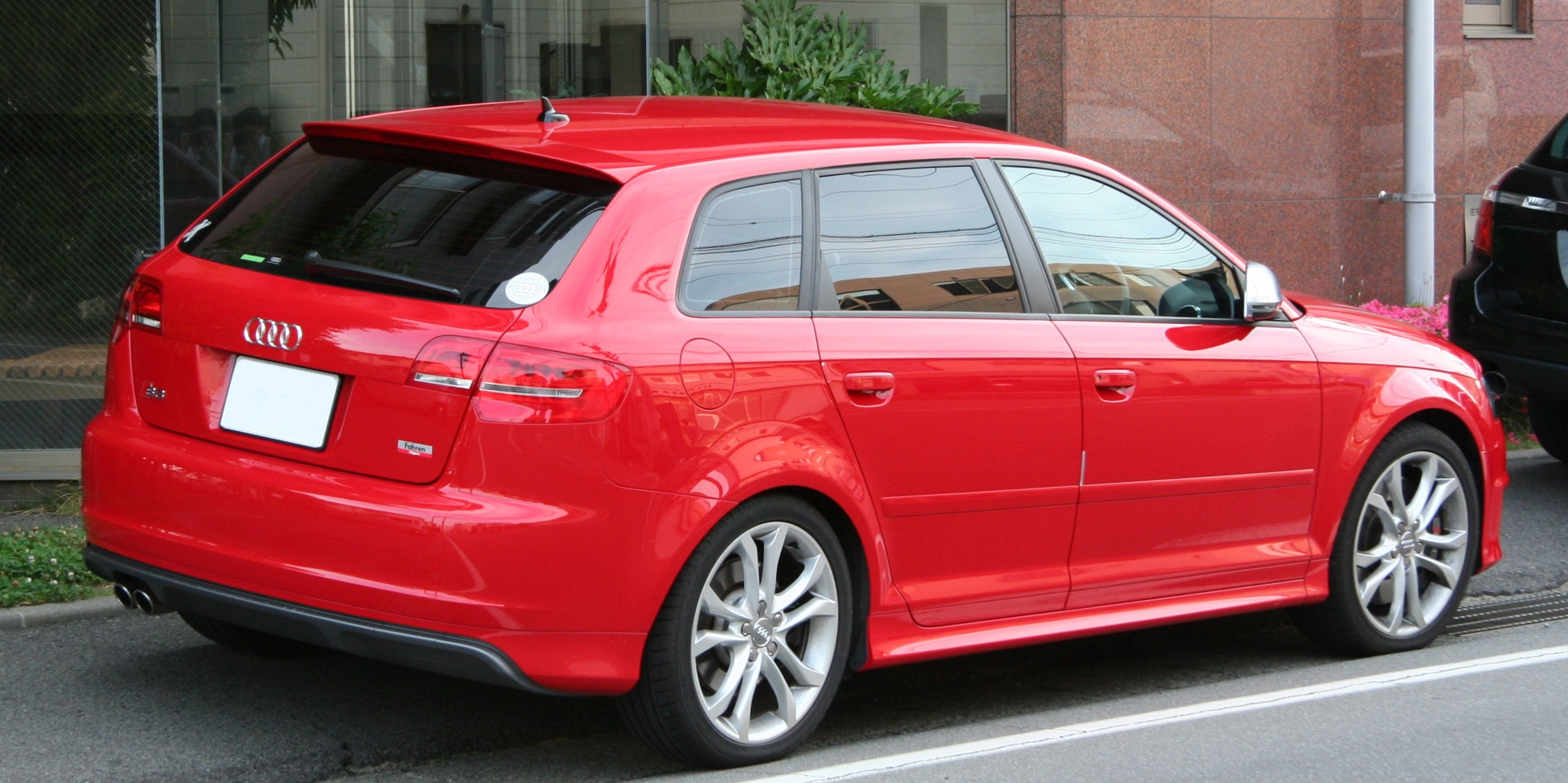
2010 Audi S3 Sportback

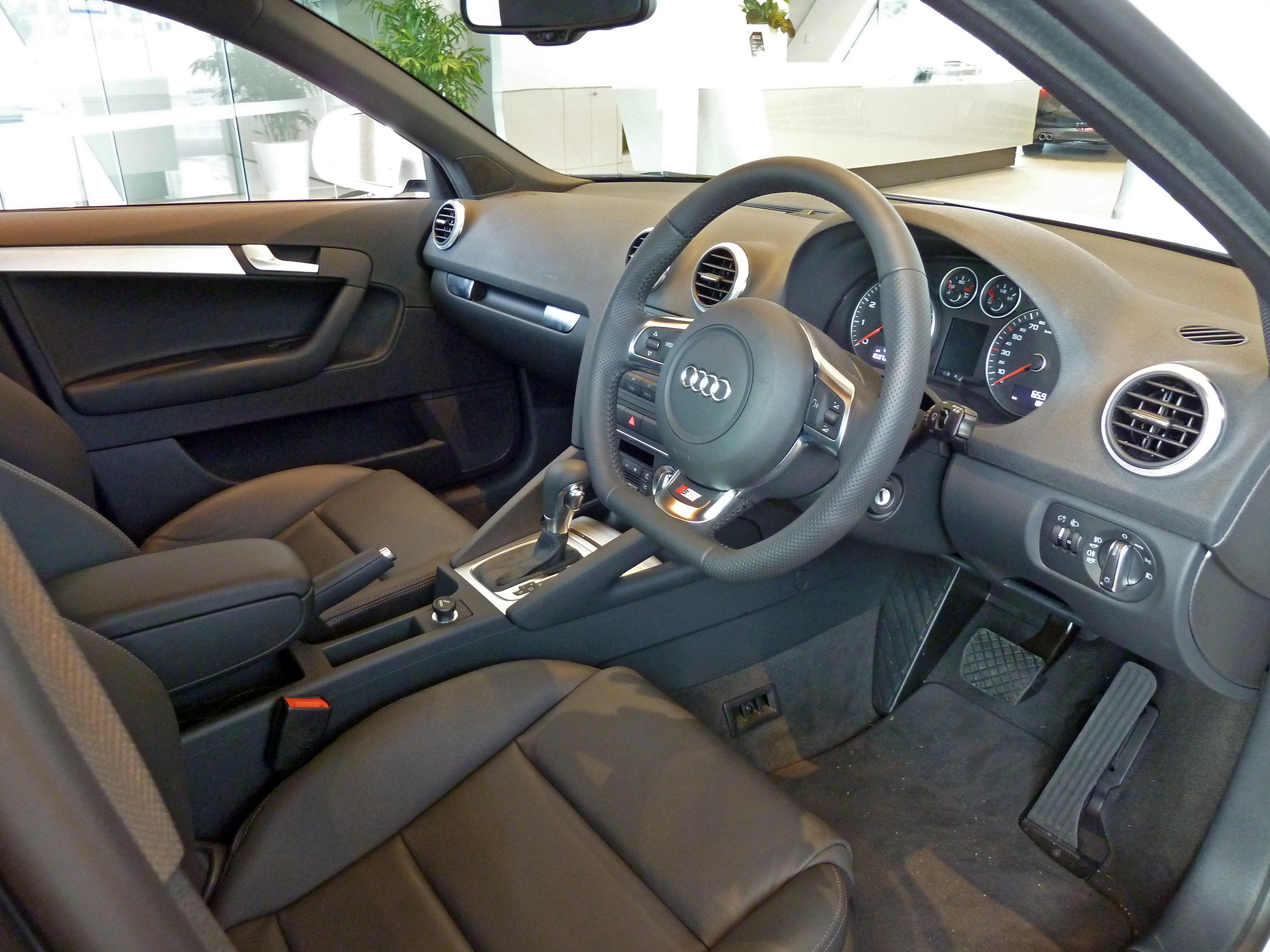
Interior

==== Audi A3 TDI Clubsport quattro (2008) ====
Audi A3 TDI Clubsport quattro is a concept car unveiled in 2008. Based on the Audi A3 three-door, it is an approach by Audi to address both performance and the environment.

The engine in the concept car is a turbocharged 2.0-litre diesel producing 224 hp (167 kW) and 332 lb⋅ft (450 N⋅m) of torque. It produces 113.8 horsepower (84.9 kW) per litre while meeting Euro 5 Diesel emission standards. It uses the quattro drive system with a six-speed manual transmission.

The chassis has Audi's Magnetic Ride Suspension system, lowering the vehicle 1.4 inches (36 mm) from the base model. It also has ceramic front brakes, a four-link rear suspension and electro-mechanical servo assist for the rack and pinion steering.

Exterior modifications include the widening of the three-door's grille, modifying the odd, and enlarging air intakes. Bolt-on fender flares and a large rear spoiler have been added. The interior changes include sport seats and a flat-bottomed steering wheel.

Audi claims performance of 0 to 62 mph (0 to 100 km/h) in 6.6 seconds with a top speed of 240 km/h (149 mph). It is expected to get approximately 40 miles per US gallon (5.9 L/100 km; 48 mpg_{‑imp}).

==== RS 3 Sportback (2011–2012) ====
The Audi RS 3 is derivative of the A3 Sportback with a 5-cylinder, 2,480 cc (151 cu in) turbocharged engine rated at 340 PS (250 kW; 335 hp) and 450 N⋅m (332 lb⋅ft), vermicular-graphite cast iron crankcase, seven-speed S tronic transmission with two automatic modes and one manual mode, Quattro on-demand four-wheel drive system, widened track to 1,564 mm (61.57 in), MacPherson strut in aluminium, lowered body by 25 mm (0.98 in), 19-inch cast aluminium wheels in machine-polished titanium styling (optional black with a red rim flange) with 235/35 front and 225/35 rear tires, 370 mm (14.57 in) front and 310 mm (12.20 in) ventilated brake discs, aluminium brake disk covers, four-piston fixed calipers in high-gloss black with RS logos, electronic stabilisation program with Sport mode, flared front fenders made of carbon-fibre-reinforced plastic (CFRP), prominent sill panels and exterior-mirror casings in matte aluminium, roof spoiler, high-gloss black diffuser insert, two elliptical exhaust tailpipes on the left, black interior, sports seats upholstered in Nappa leather with silver contrasting stitching, inlays in Piano black finish or Aluminum Race colour, flat-bottomed leather multifunction sports steering wheel, choice of five body colours are available with an unlimited selection of custom paint finishes. Its acceleration is quoted as 0 to 100 km/h (0 to 62 mph) in 4.6 seconds, with an electronically limited top speed of 250 km/h (155 mph). Optional features included front bucket seats, roof rails in matte aluminium look, styling packages in black or matte aluminium. First deliveries started in early 2011.

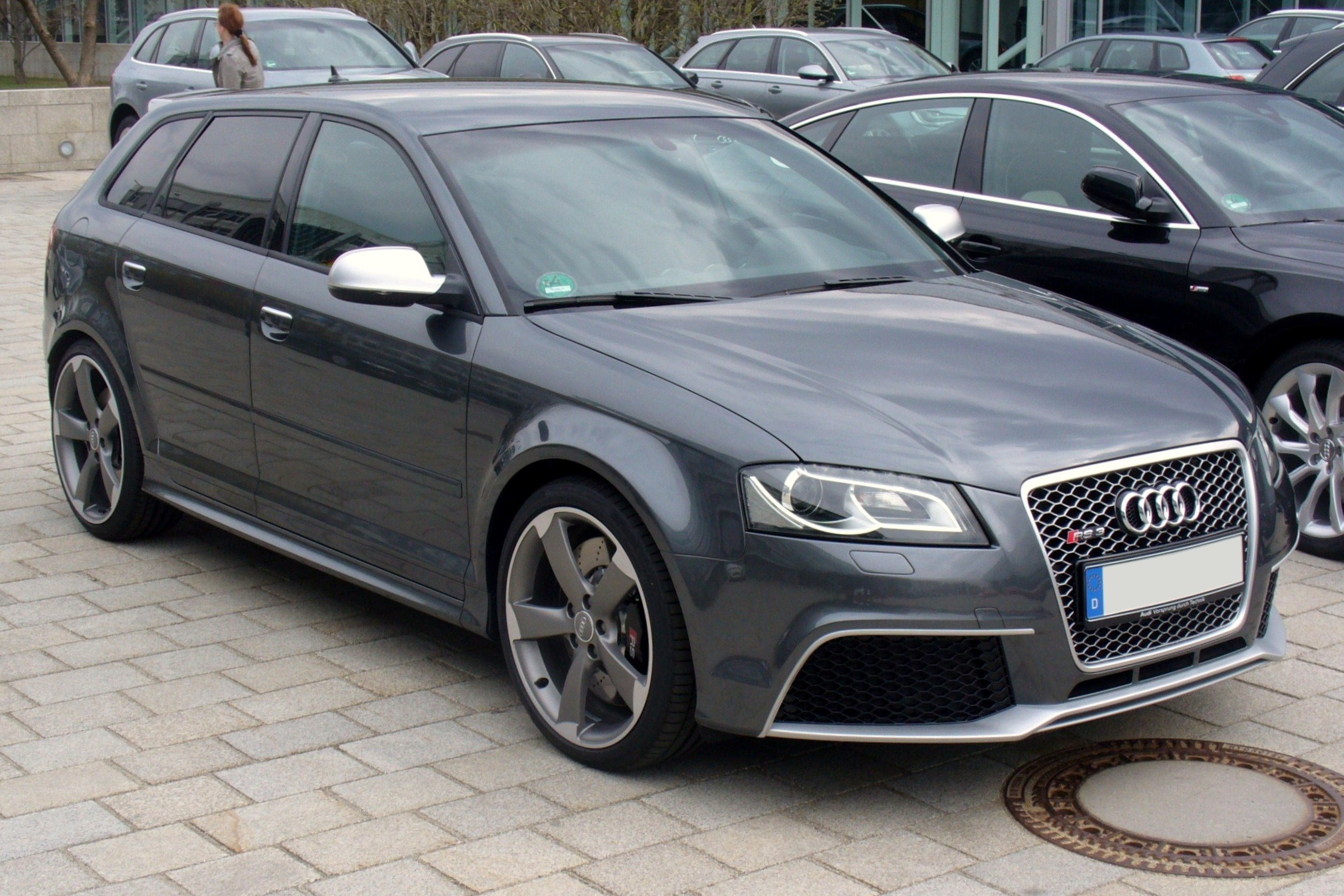
Audi RS3 Sportback front view (8P)

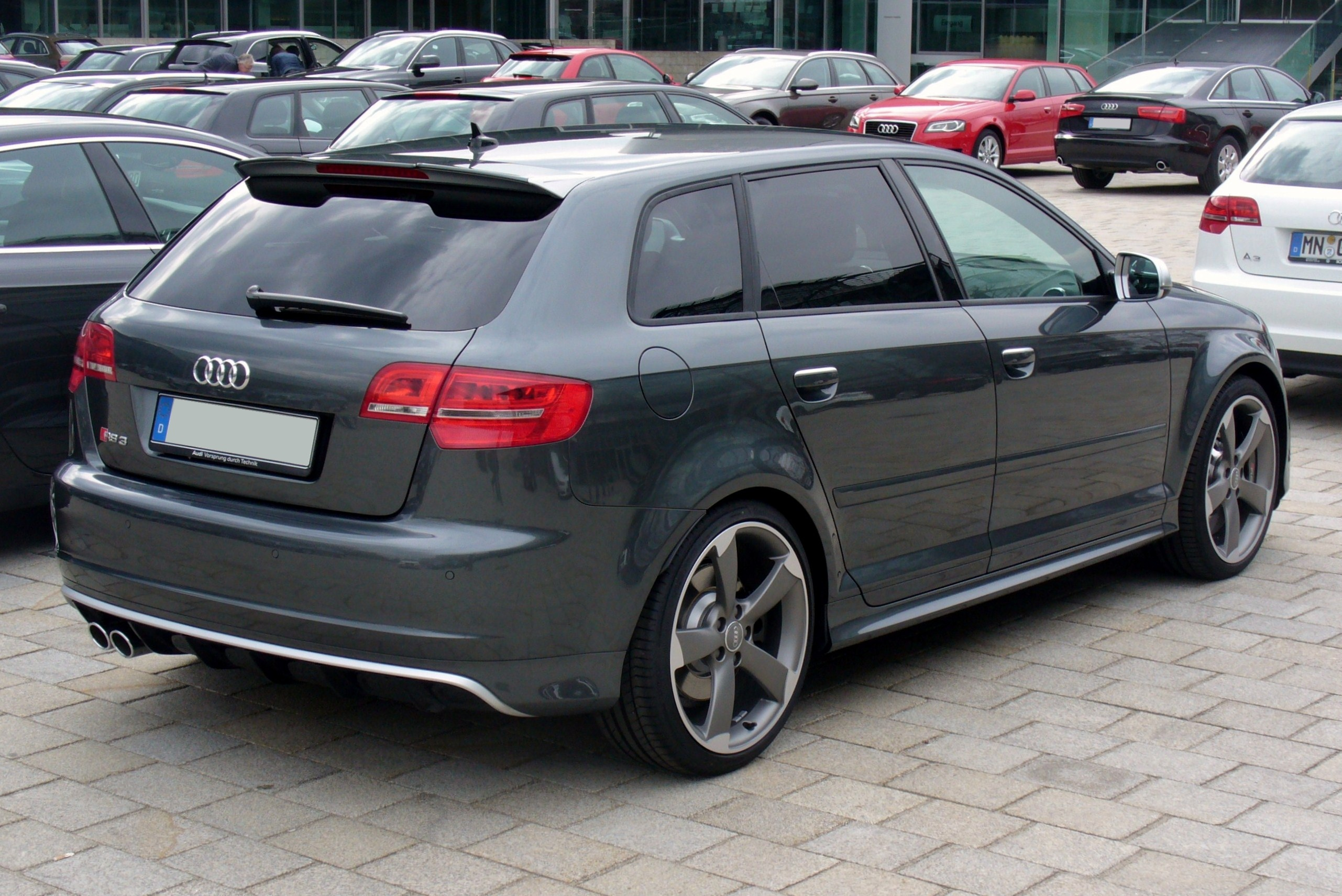
Audi RS3 Sportback rear view (8P)

==== A3 Cabriolet Sport and S line Final Edition (2013) ====
The A3 Cabriolet Sport Final Edition is a version of the A3 Cabriolet Sport model for the UK market, commemorating the end of the A3 Cabriolet's production run. It included Vienna leather upholstery, front seat heating, rear parking sensors, automatic headlight and wiper activation, cruise control, a Bluetooth mobile phone interface.

S line Final Edition is based on the A3 Cabriolet Sport Final Edition model, with 18-inch S line alloy wheel with a new five-segment spoke design, full Vienna leather upholstery, S line safety and entertainment features with xenon plus headlights with LED daytime running lamps, DVD-based satellite-navigation, Audi Music Interface iPod connection, a BOSE sound system.

=== Engines ===
In January 2007, the naturally-aspirated 2.0 FSI was replaced by a new turbocharged 1.8 TFSI engine rated 160 PS (118 kW; 158 hp). It is available in front-wheel drive only.

In late 2007, Audi introduced a new 125 PS (92 kW; 123 hp) 1.4 L TFSI engine for the A3, replacing the 1.6 L FSI engine, and a new diesel "e"-model. The "e"-model, Audi's equivalent of Volkswagen's BlueMotion, is available with the 1.9 L TDI engine, and offers a more ecological car, with a CO_{2} emission below 120 g/km.

Audi released two models of the A3 1.6 TDI for the European market. The first uses Audi's start/stop and energy recovery system, and produces 105 PS (77 kW; 104 hp). This engine achieves approximately 4.1 L/100 km (69 mpg_{‑imp}; 57 mpg_{‑US}). The second engine does not use the same efficiency systems and will produce 90 PS (66 kW; 89 hp) will get 4.5 L/100 km (63 mpg_{‑imp}; 52 mpg_{‑US}). They went on sale in June 2009.

In 2009, the 1.6 L eight-valve petrol engine was replaced by a turbocharged 1.2 TFSI engine already found in VW's Polo and Golf models. This engine is rated at 105 PS (77 kW; 104 hp) and 175 N⋅m (129 lb⋅ft), emitting 127 g/km of CO_{2}.

The A3 2.0 TDI clean diesel is a version of Audi's A3 2.0 TDI for the North American market, making it the second Audi TDI vehicle sold in North America, following the Audi Q7 TDI in 2008. It is a FWD vehicle with S-Tronic transmission with Hill-hold assist, Sirius satellite radio, Leather seats and steering wheel, Auxiliary audio input, Dual-zone climate control, 17-inch (430 mm) alloy wheels. The vehicle was unveiled at the 2009 North American International Auto Show. This US model would begin sale in the first quarter of 2010 as a 2010 model year vehicle.

In March 2011, the line-up was expanded with the introduction of a more powerful 2.0 TDI with 170 PS (125 kW; 168 hp).

The 2.0 TDI engine was included in the engines found by the United States Environmental Protection Agency to use software intentionally designed to turn off emission control systems except when undergoing emission testing. Models made from 2009 to 2015 were affected.

Model	Engine displacement	Engine code	Power at rpm	Torque at rpm	0–100 km/h (0–62 mph) time	Years
petrol engines
1.2 TFSI	1,197 cc (73 cu in) I4	CBZB	105 PS (77 kW; 104 hp) at 5,000 rpm	175 N⋅m (129 lb⋅ft) at 1,550–4,100 rpm	10.6 s	2010–2013
1.4 TFSI	1,390 cc (85 cu in) I4	CAXC	125 PS (92 kW; 123 hp) at 5,000 rpm	200 N⋅m (148 lb⋅ft) at 1,500–4,000 rpm	9.1 s	2007–2013
1.6 MPI	1,595 cc (97 cu in) I4	BGU / BSE / BSF / CCS	102 PS (75 kW; 101 hp) at 5,600 rpm	148 N⋅m (109 lb⋅ft) at 3,800 rpm	11.5 s	2003–2010
1.6 FSI	1,598 cc (98 cu in) I4	BAG / BLF / BLP	115 PS (85 kW; 113 hp) at 6,000 rpm	155 N⋅m (114 lb⋅ft) at 4,000 rpm	10.6 s	2003–2007
1.8 TFSI	1,798 cc (110 cu in) I4	BYT / BZB	160 PS (118 kW; 158 hp) at 5,000–6,200 rpm	250 N⋅m (184 lb⋅ft) at 1,500–4,200 rpm	7.7 s	2007–2008
1.8 TFSI	1,798 cc (110 cu in) I4	CDAA	160 PS (118 kW; 158 hp) at 4,500–6,200 rpm	250 N⋅m (184 lb⋅ft) at 1,500–4,500 rpm	7.4 s	2009–2013
2.0 FSI	1,984 cc (121 cu in) I4	AXW / BLR / BLX / BLY; BVY / BVX / BVZ	150 PS (110 kW; 148 hp) at 6,000 rpm	200 N⋅m (148 lb⋅ft) at 3,250–4,250 rpm	8.8	2003–2008
2.0 TFSI	1,984 cc (121 cu in) I4	AXX / BPY / BWA / CAWB	200 PS (147 kW; 197 hp) at 5,100–6,000 rpm	280 N⋅m (207 lb⋅ft) at 1,800–5,000 rpm	6.8 s	2004–2008
2.0 TFSI	1,984 cc (121 cu in) I4	CCZA	200 PS (147 kW; 197 hp)	280 N⋅m (207 lb⋅ft) at 1,700–5,000 rpm	6.8 s	2009–2013
2.0 TFSI	1,984 cc (121 cu in) I4	BHZ / CDLA	265 PS (195 kW; 261 hp) at 6,000 rpm	350 N⋅m (258 lb⋅ft) at 2,500–5,000 rpm	5.6 s	2006–2013 (Audi S3 only)
2.5 TFSI	2,480 cc (151 cu in) I5	CEPA	340 PS (250 kW; 335 hp) at 5,400–6,500 rpm	450 N⋅m (332 lb⋅ft) at 1,600–5,300 rpm	4.6 s	2011–2013 (Audi RS 3 only)
3.2	3,189 cc (195 cu in) VR6	BDB / BMJ / BUB	250 PS (184 kW; 247 hp) at 6,300 rpm	320 N⋅m (236 lb⋅ft) at 2,500–3,000 rpm	6.3 s	2003–2009
diesel engines
1.6 TDI	1,598 cc (98 cu in) I4	CAYB	90 PS (66 kW; 89 hp) at 4,200 rpm	230 N⋅m (170 lb⋅ft) at 1500–2500	11.4 s	2009–2013
1.6 TDI	1,598 cc (98 cu in) I4	CAYC	105 PS (77 kW; 104 hp) at 4,400 rpm	250 N⋅m (184 lb⋅ft) at 1500–2500	11.0 s	2009–2013
1.9 TDI	1,896 cc (116 cu in) I4	BJB / BKC / BXE / BLS	105 PS (77 kW; 104 hp) at 4,000 rpm	250 N⋅m (184 lb⋅ft) at 1,900 rpm	11.0 s	2003–2009
2.0 TDI	1,968 cc (120 cu in) I4	BKD	140 PS (103 kW; 138 hp) at 4,000 rpm	320 N⋅m (236 lb⋅ft) at 1,750–2,500 rpm	9.2 s	2003–2008
2.0 TDI	1,968 cc (120 cu in) I4	BMM	140 PS (103 kW; 138 hp) at 4,000 rpm	320 N⋅m (236 lb⋅ft) at 1,750–2,500 rpm	9.2 s	2006–2008
2.0 TDI	1,968 cc (120 cu in) I4	BMN	170 PS (125 kW; 168 hp) at 4,200 rpm	350 N⋅m (258 lb⋅ft) at 1,750–2,500 rpm	7.9 s	2006–2008
2.0 TDI	1,968 cc (120 cu in) I4	CBAB	140 PS (103 kW; 138 hp) at 4,200 rpm	320 N⋅m (236 lb⋅ft) at 1,750–2,500 rpm	9.1 s	2008–2013
2.0 TDI	1,968 cc (120 cu in) I4	CBBB	170 PS (125 kW; 168 hp) at 4,200 rpm	350 N⋅m (258 lb⋅ft) at 1,750–2,500 rpm	7.8 s (S-Tronic) 8.2 s (Manual)	2008–2013
2.0 TDI	1,968 cc (120 cu in) I4	CBEA	140 PS (103 kW; 138 hp) at 4,200 rpm	320 N⋅m (236 lb⋅ft) at 1,750–2,500 rpm	8.6 s	2010–2013

== Third generation (Typ 8V; 2012) ==
Third generation
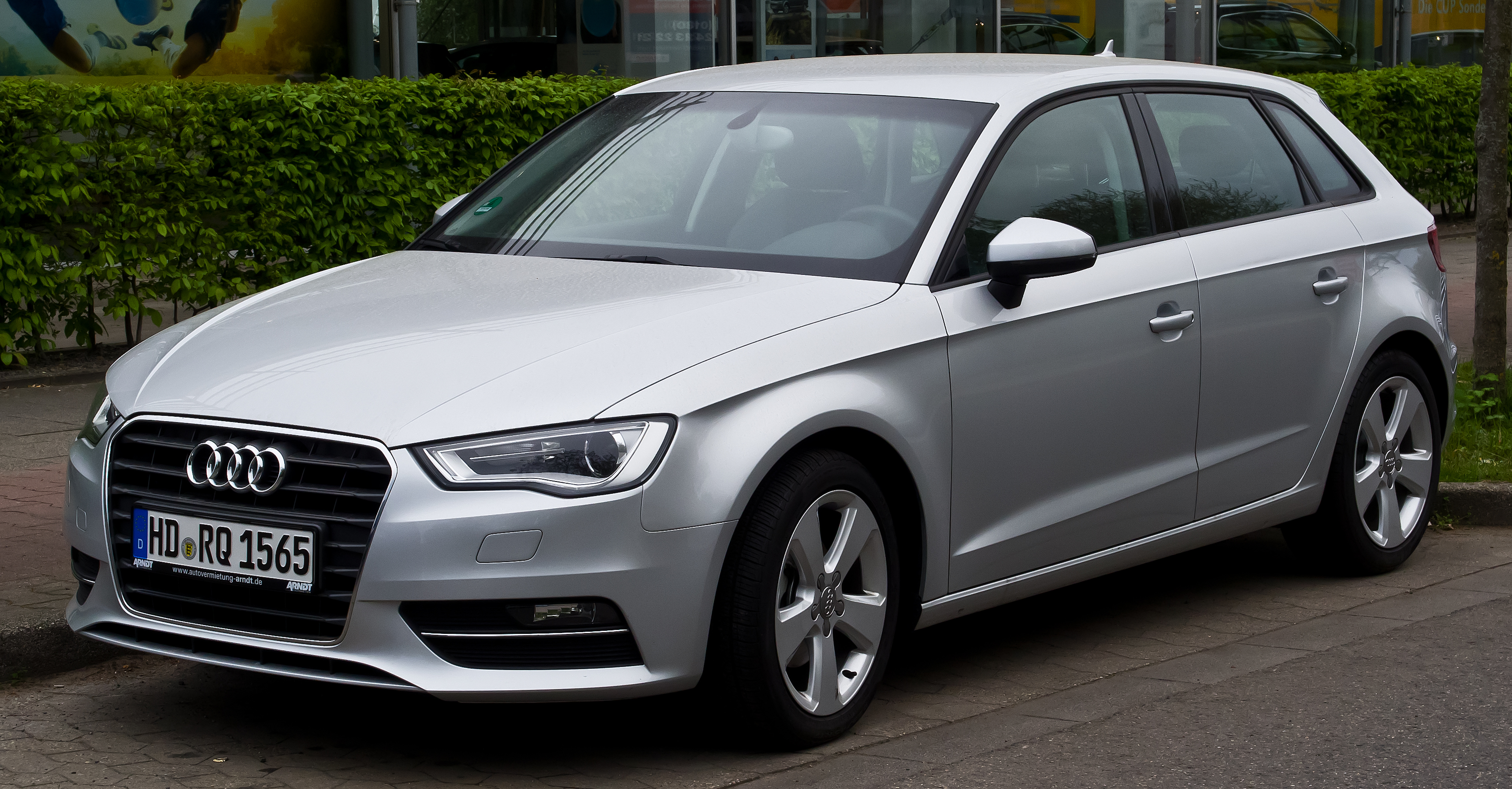
- Audi A3 Sportback (pre-facelift)

Overview
- Model code: 8V
- Production: 2012–2020; October 2013–2020 (Convertible)
- Model years: 2015–2020 (saloon); 2015–2019 (convertible)
- Assembly: Germany: Ingolstadt; Hungary: Győr; China: Foshan (FAW-Volkswagen); India: Aurangabad (Audi India); Brazil: São José dos Pinhais; Algeria: Relizane (SOVAC-Volkswagen)
- Designer: Dany Garand (2009); Markus Gleitz (saloon: 2010)

Body and chassis
- Body style: 2-door convertible; 3-door hatchback; 4-door saloon; 5-door hatchback
- Platform: Volkswagen Group MQB platform
- Related: Volkswagen Golf Mk7; SEAT León Mk3; Škoda Octavia Mk3

Powertrain
- Engine: Petrol engines: 1.0 L TFSi I3; 1.2 L TFSi I4; 1.4 L TFSi I4; 1.4 L TFSi ACDT I4; 1.4 L TFSi ACDT PHEV I4; 1.5 L EA211 Evo TFSi ACDT I4; 1.8 L EA888 TFSi I4; 2.0 L EA888 TFSi I4; 2.5 L TFSi I5; Bi-Fuel (Petrol/CNG) engine: 1.4 L TGi ACDT I4 (A3 g-tron); Diesel engines: 1.6 L TDi I4; 2.0 L TDi I4
- Transmission: 6-speed manual MQ350; 6-speed (S-Tronic) DQ250; 7-speed (S-Tronic) DQ200; 7-speed (S-Tronic) DQ381; 7-speed (S-Tronic) DQ500

Dimensions
- Wheelbase: 2-door convertible: 2,595 mm (102.2 in); 3-door: 2,601 mm (102.4 in); 4-door: 2,636 mm (103.8 in); 5-door: 2,636 mm (103.8 in)
- Length: 2-door convertible: 4,423 mm (174.1 in); 3-door: 4,237 mm (166.8 in); 4-door: 4,456 mm (175.4 in); 5-door: 4,310 mm (169.7 in)
- Width: 2-door convertible: 1,793 mm (70.6 in); 3-door: 1,777 mm (70.0 in); 4-door: 1,796 mm (70.7 in); 5-door: 1,785 mm (70.3 in)
- Height: 2-door convertible: 1,409 mm (55.5 in); 3-door: 1,421 mm (55.9 in); 4-door: 1,416 mm (55.7 in); 5-door: 1,421 mm (55.9 in)
- Kerb weight: 1,150–1,520 kg (2,535–3,351 lb)

The vehicle was unveiled at the 2012 Geneva Motor Show and went on sale in Europe in September 2012.

First vehicle using the flexible modular Volkswagen Group MQB platform, the third generation is available as a three-door hatchback, a five-door "Sportback", a four-door saloon to directly rival the Mercedes-Benz CLA-Class, and a two-door Cabriolet.

The front suspension is a MacPherson strut set-up while the rear utilises torsion bar suspension (models with less than 150 PS) or multi-link rear suspension (models with 150 PS or more).

The features include:

- Multi-collision brake: Emergency braking function stops the car after the first impact, to prevent secondary collisions
- Multi Media Interface MMI entertainment system (Tegra 3 processor) with handwriting recognition
- 4G broadband internet
- Adaptive cruise control
- Pre sense front/basic radar-guided collision avoidance system
- Active lane assist
- Side assist
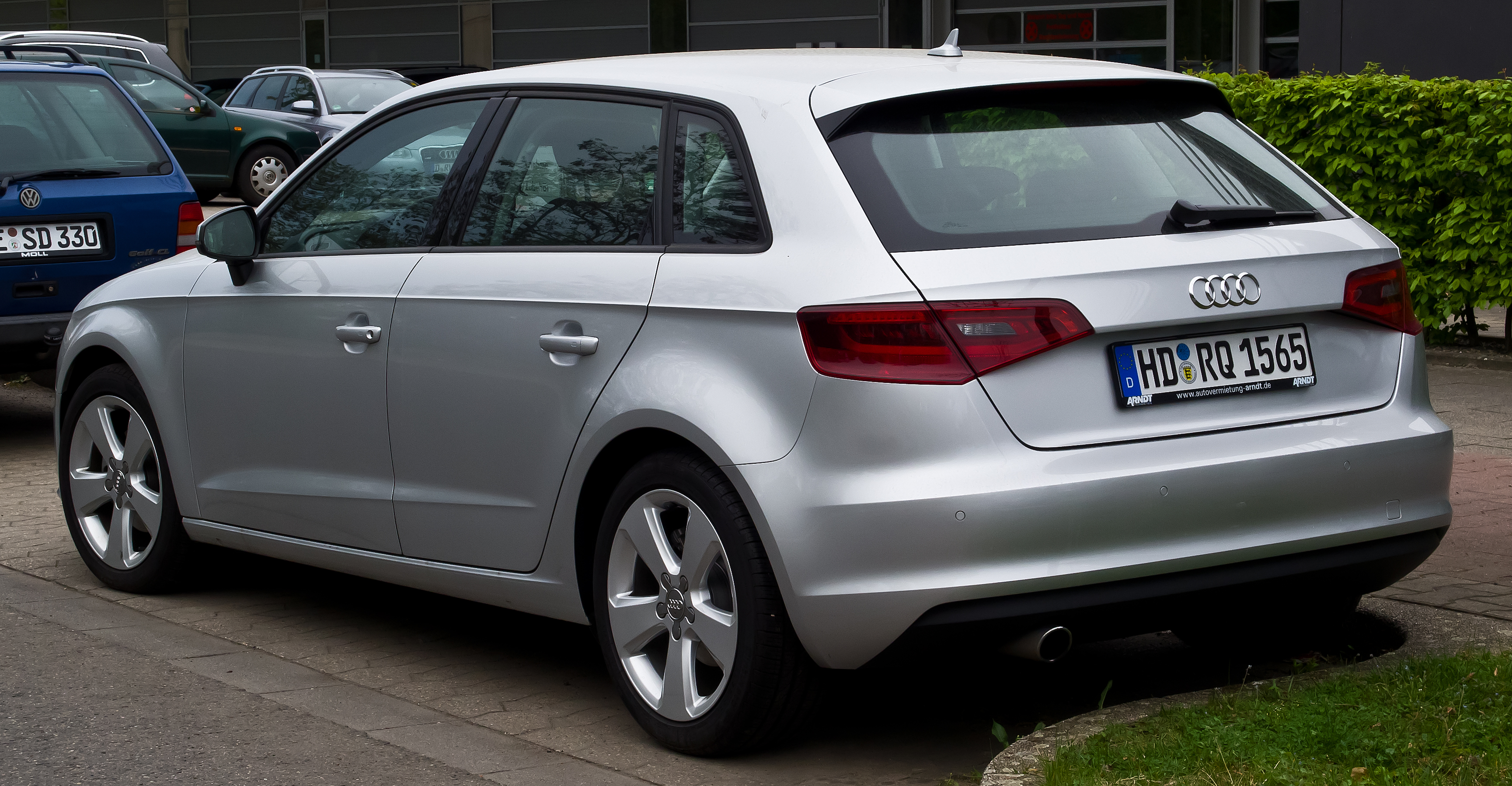
A3 Sportback (5 door; pre-facelift)

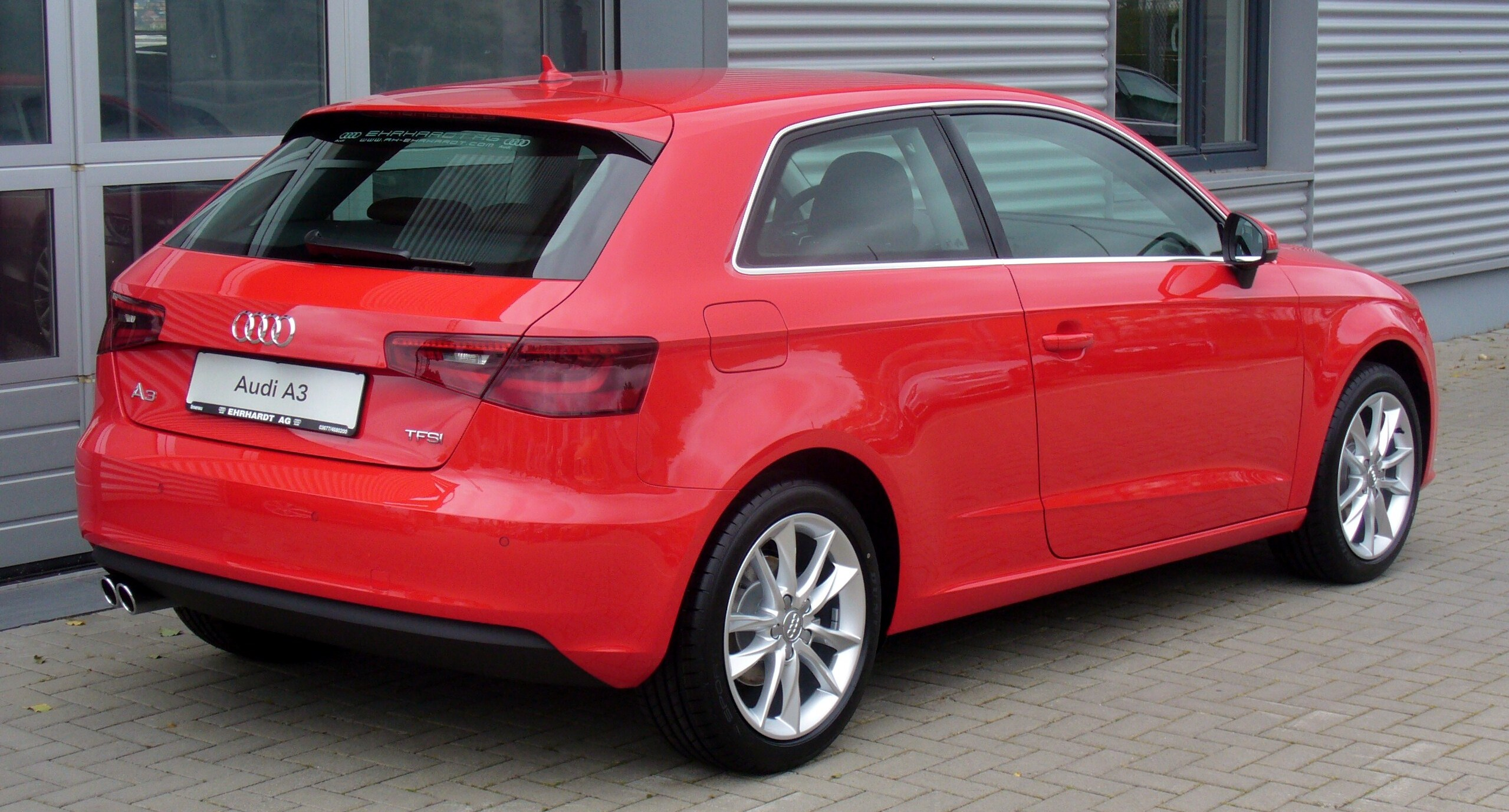
A3 Sportback (3 door; pre-facelift)

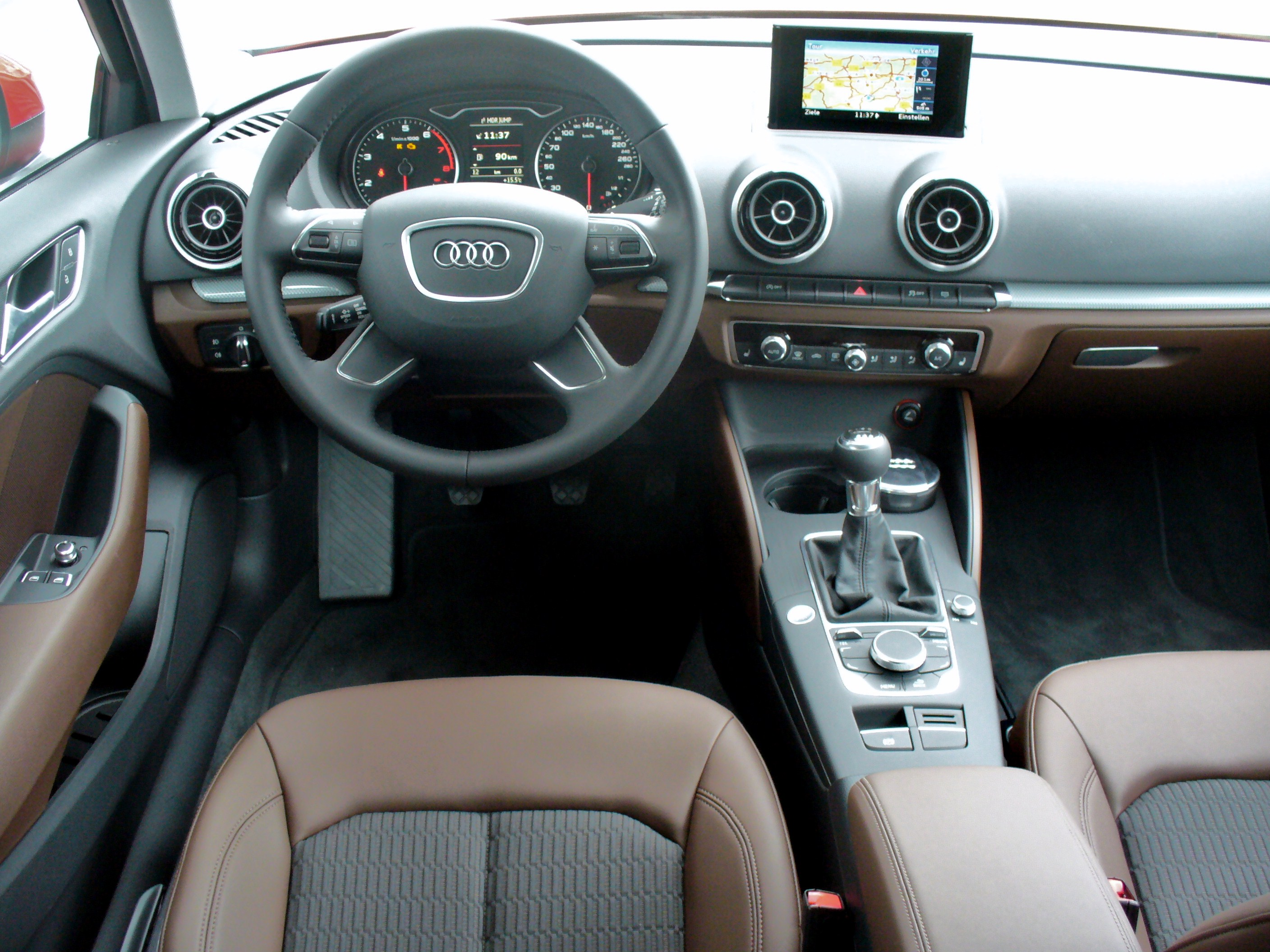
2012 Audi A3 hatchback interior (Ambiente; pre-facelift)

Early German models include 1.4 TFSI (122 PS), 1.8 TFSI (180 PS), and 2.0 TDI (150 PS). 1.2 TFSI (105 PS), 1.4 TFSI (140 PS), 1.8 TFSI quattro (180 PS), 1.6 TDI (105 PS), and 2.0 TDI quattro (150 PS) were added in 2013.

A3 1.2 TFSI (105 PS) was added to the UK market in 2013, followed by A3 1.4 TFSI (140 PS) in 2013.

For the 2020 model year, the vehicle is exclusively built at the Ingolstadt plant, as opposed to previous model years where saloons and convertibles were built at the Győr plant.

=== A3 Saloon (2013–2020) ===
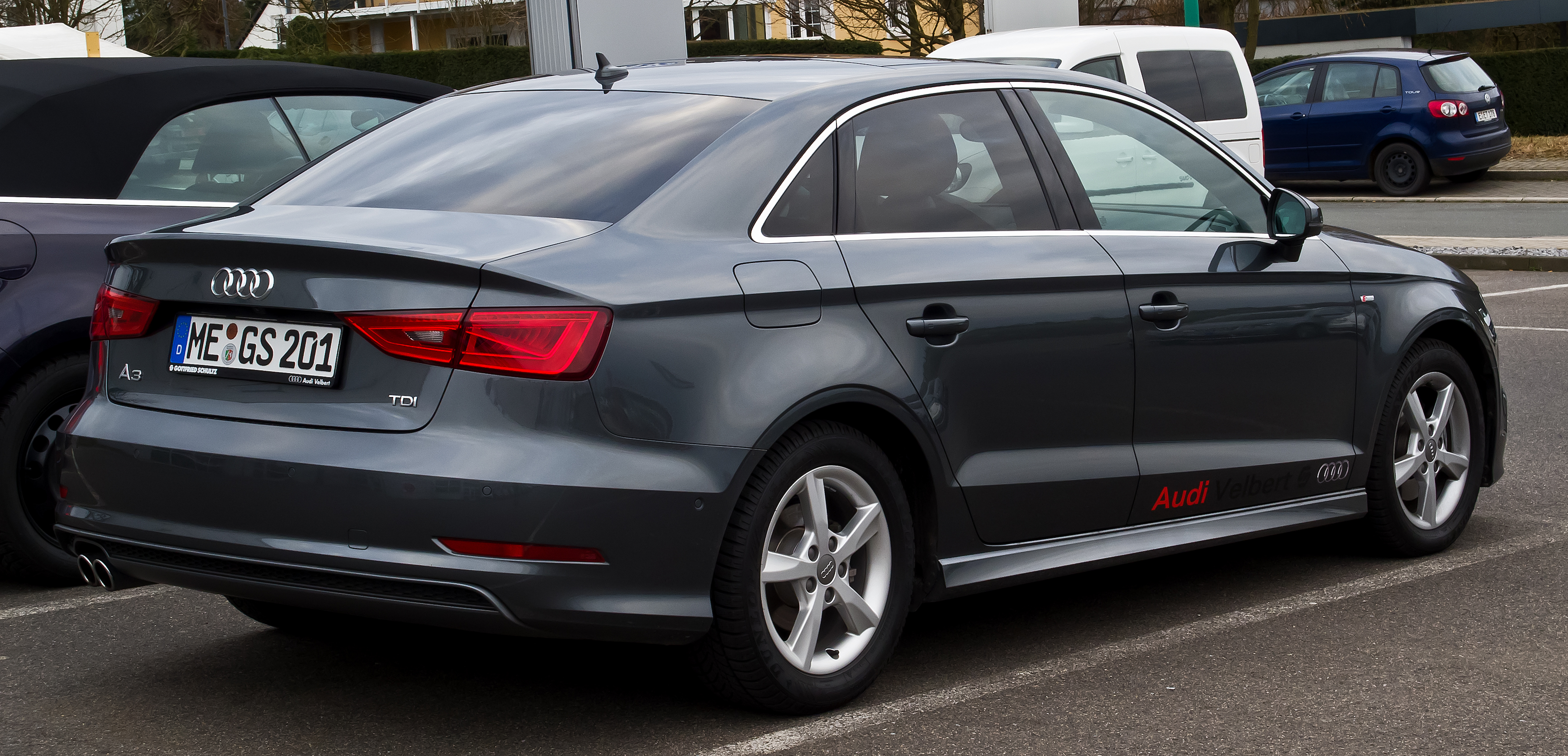
Audi A3 Saloon (pre-facelift)

The A3 Saloon includes a body 11 mm (0.43 in) wider and 9 mm (0.35 in) lower than that of the A3 Sportback. Other features include 16- to 18-inch-wheels (optional 19-inch wheels via quattro GmbH) and electronic stabilisation control with electronic differential lock.

The vehicle was unveiled at the 2013 New York Auto Show.

The German model went on sale in the third quarter of 2013. Early models include 1.4 TFSI (140 PS), 1.8 TFSI (180 PS), and 2.0 TDI (150 PS).

Delivery of the UK models began in late 2013. Early models include 1.4 TFSI (140 PS), 1.8 TFSI (180 PS), and 2.0 TDI (150 PS).

=== A3 Cabrio (2013–2020) ===
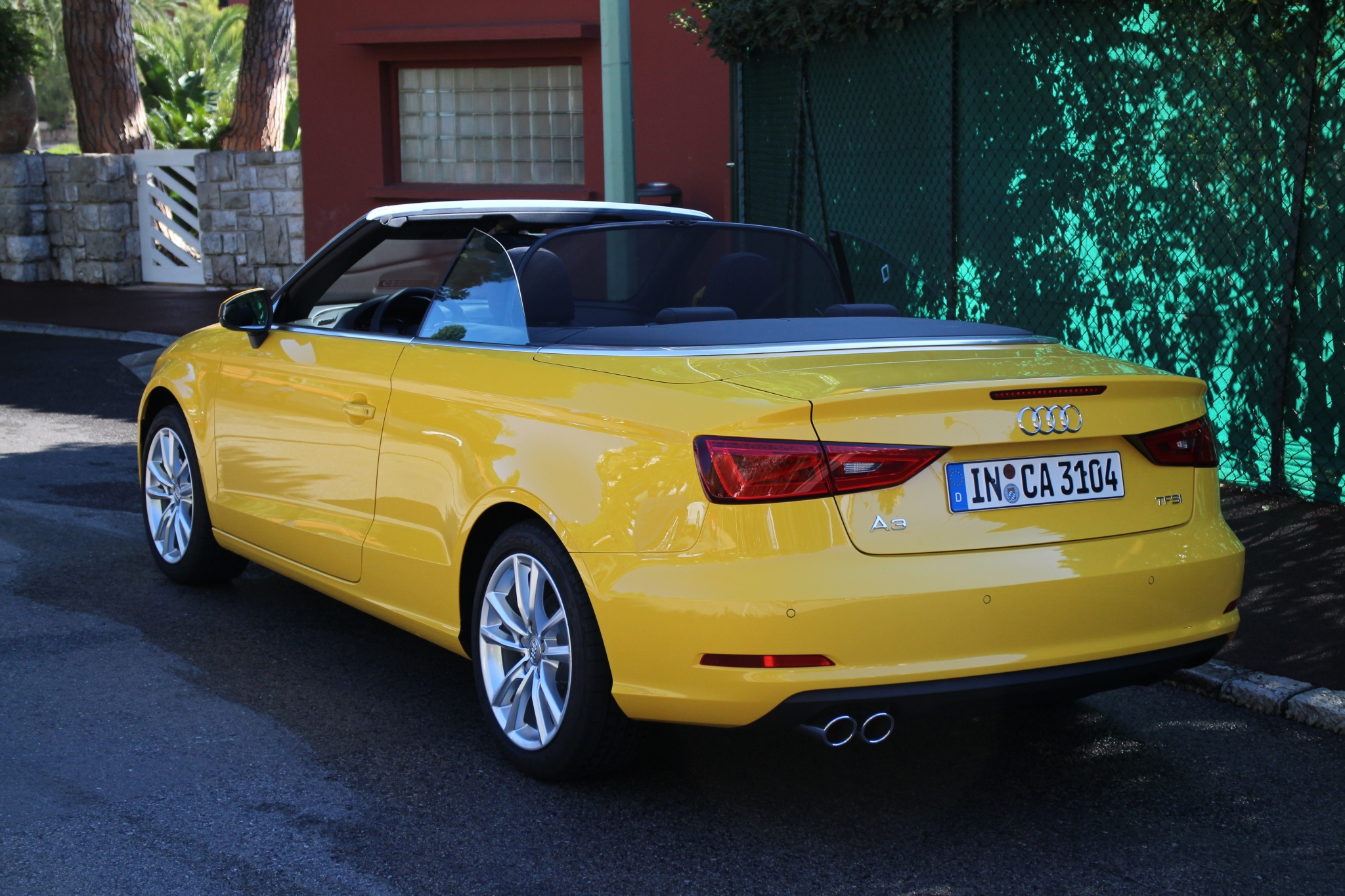
Audi A3 Cabriolet in Vegas Yellow

The A3 cabriolet model was offered starting in 2014. It has a three-box body style and a larger boot than the previous model (320 litres versus 260).

=== A3 Sportback (2013–2020) ===
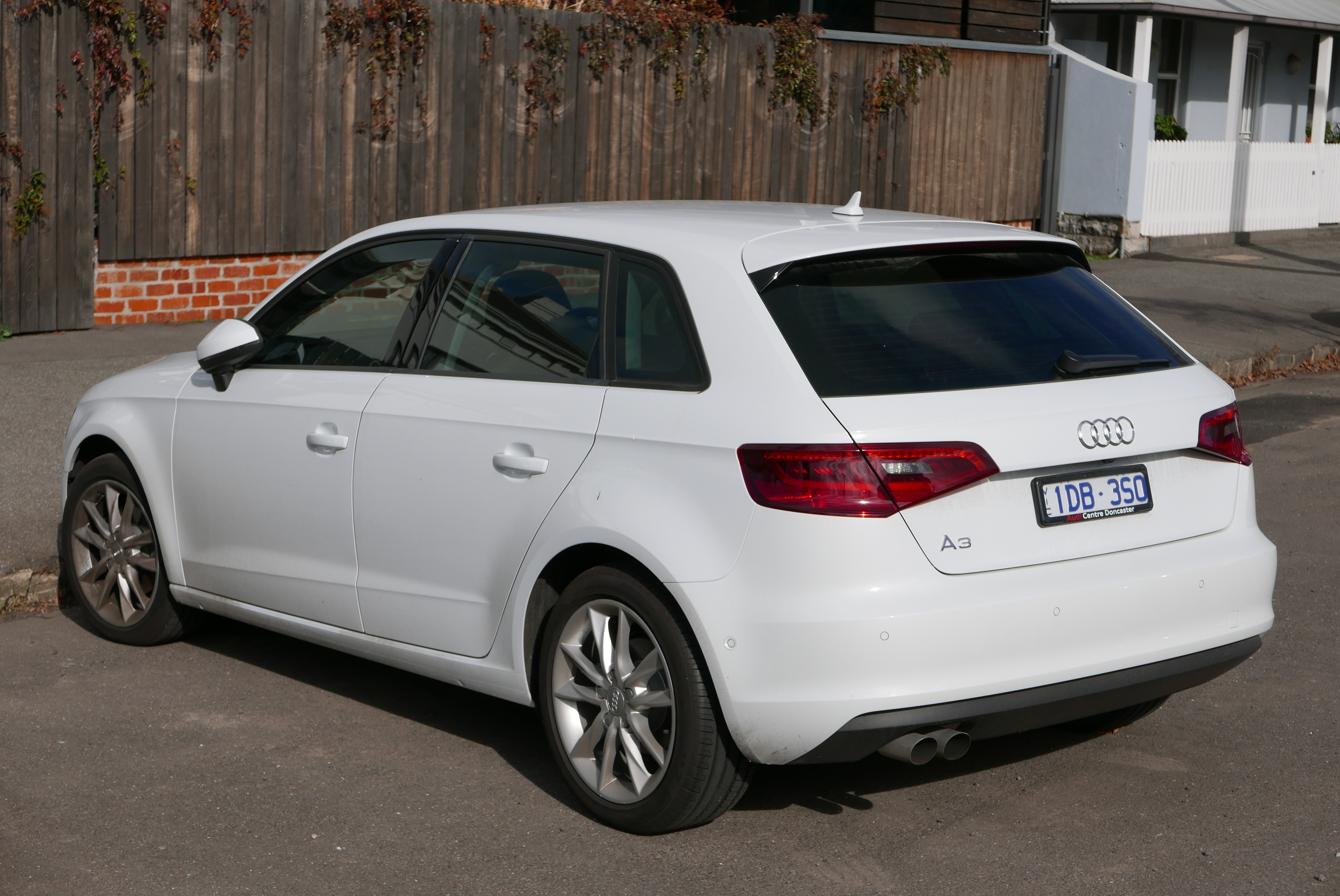
Audi A3 Sportback in Glacier White Metallic

The Audi A3 Sportback includes a wheelbase 58 mm (2.28 in) over previous model, 35 mm (1.38 in) longer than that of the A3 and a front axle shifted forward by 40 mm (1.57 in) over the previous model. Other features include a choice of 13 body colours (three solid finishes, eight metallic finishes, and two pearl-effect finishes), an optional high-gloss package adding accents around the windows (standard with the Ambiente trim line), six-speed manual transmission (optional S-Tronic) for all engine models, 16 or 17-inch wheels depending on trim line (optional 18-inch wheels), Audi drive select (standard with Ambition) with optional S-Tronic, and optional electromagnetic damper control system.

German models went on sale in February 2013. Early models include 1.4 TFSI (122 PS), 1.8 TFSI (180 PS), 1.8 TFSI quattro (180 PS), and 1.6 TDI. 1.2 TFSI (105 PS), 1.4 TFSI (140 PS), 2.0 TDI (150 PS), 2.0 TDI quattro (150 PS), and 2.0 TDI (184 PS) were available in later date.

==== A3 Sportback g-tron (2013–2020) ====
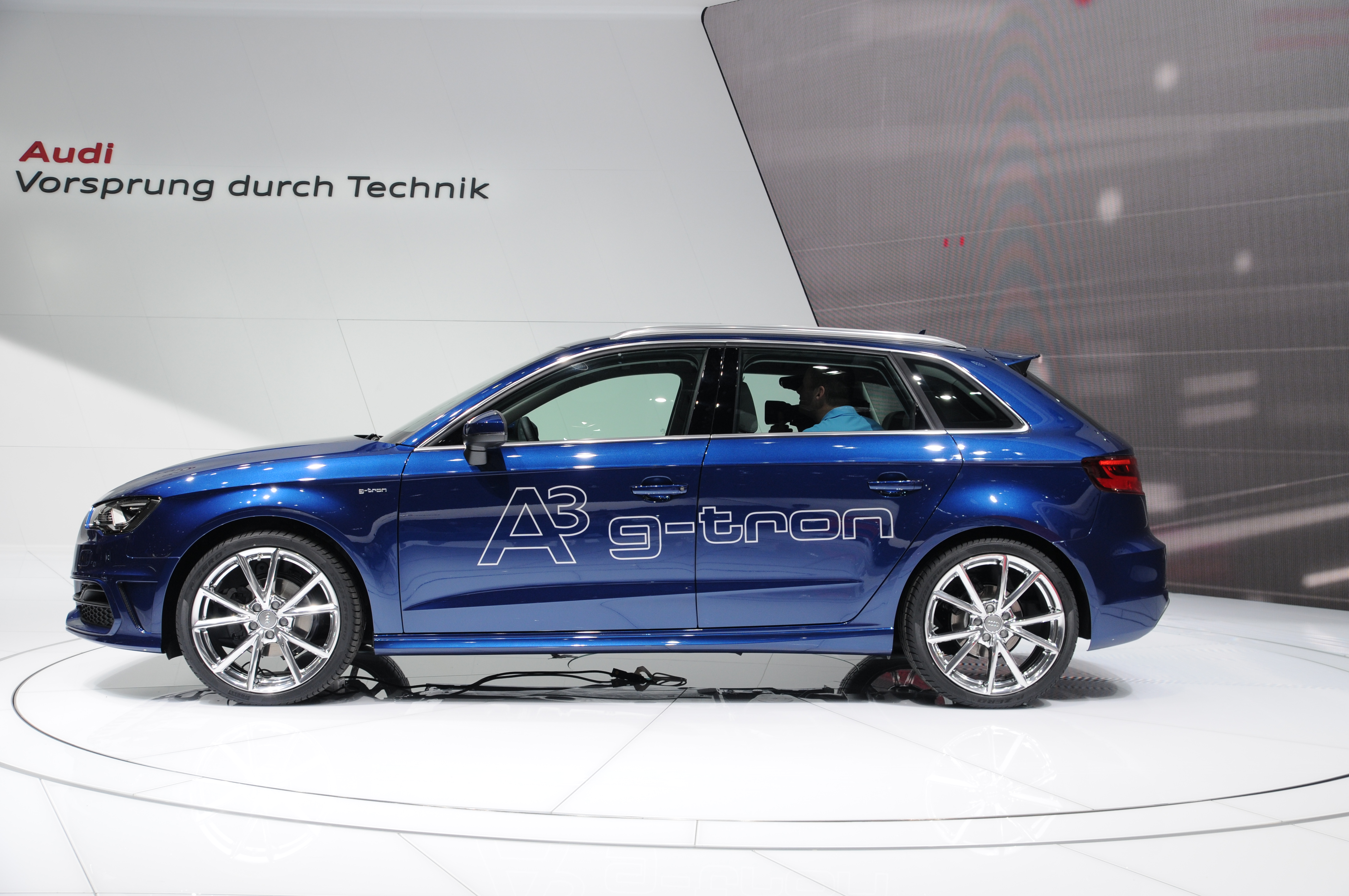
Audi A3 Sportback g-tron in Cosmos Blue Metallic

It is a version of the A3 Sportback with 1.4 TFSI (110 PS) engine powered by compressed natural gas or Audi e-gas synthetic methane; gas tank made of gas-impermeable polyamide polymer, carbon fibre reinforced polymer (CFRP), glass fibre reinforced polymer; and an electronic gas pressure regulator. The synthetic methane was produced by waste product from a nearby Werlte biogas plant operated by power utility EWE.

==== A3 Sportback e-tron (2014–2018, 2020) ====
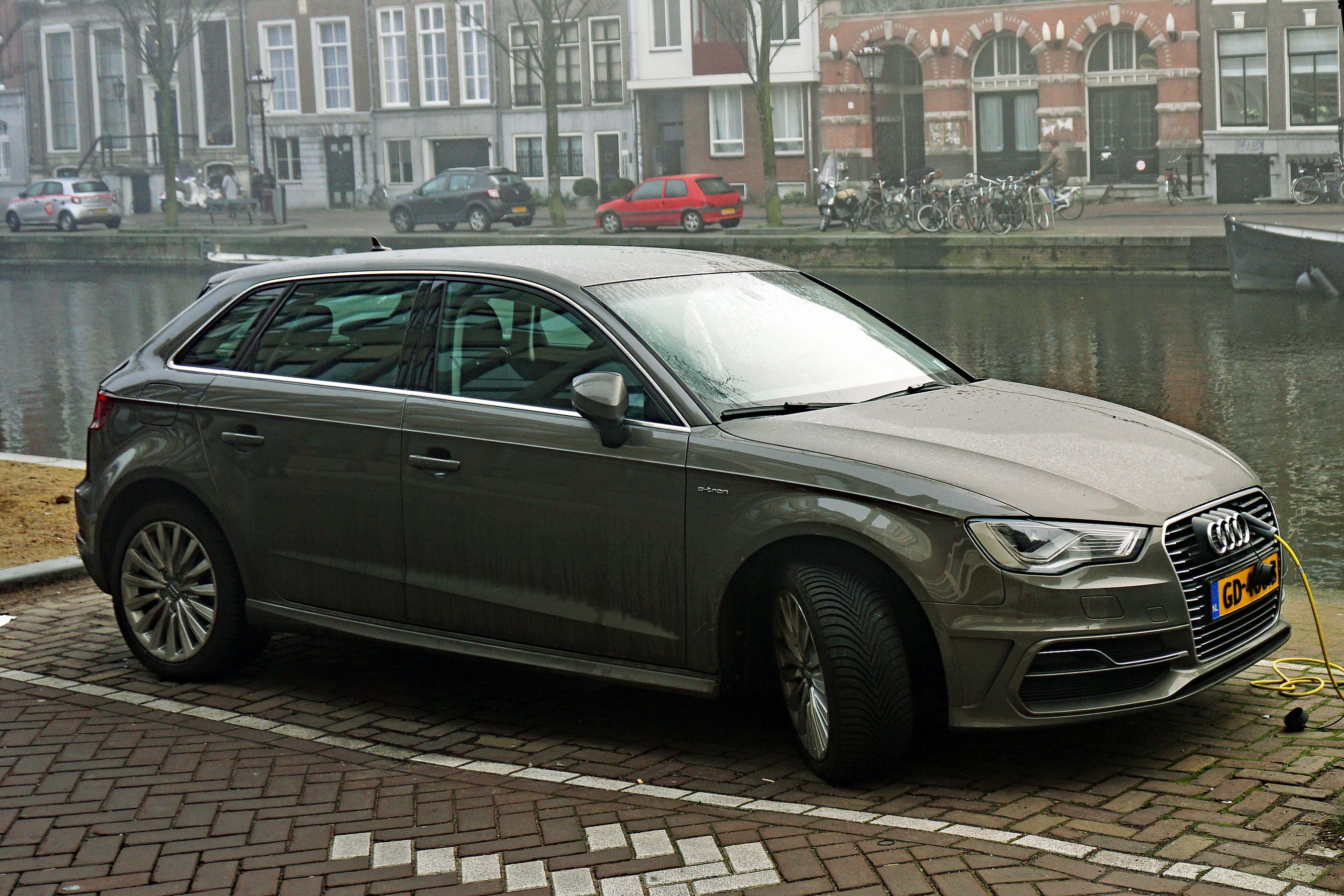
A3 Sportback e-tron

The plug-in hybrid concept car was unveiled at the 2013 Geneva Motor Show. In May 2013 Audi confirmed its decision to produce a plug-in hybrid version of the A3, the Audi A3 Sportback e-tron, which was scheduled for retail sales in Europe by late 2013, and by mid 2014 in the U.S. and the UK. The A3 e-tron shares the same plug-in hybrid powertrain used in both the Volkswagen Golf GTE and Passat GTE. To charge the A3 e-tron, the Audi four rings logo is pulled along to reveal a charging socket.

The A3 Sportback e-tron is powered by a 1.4 L TFSI petrol engine that delivers 150 PS (110 kW; 148 hp) and 249 N⋅m (184 lb⋅ft) of torque, coupled with a 101 bhp (75 kW) electric motor, which is integrated into the car's six-speed dual-clutch automatic transmission, for a total combined output of 204 PS (150 kW; 201 hp) and 329 N⋅m (243 lb⋅ft). The plug-in hybrid has an 8.8 kWh battery pack that delivers an all-electric range of 50 km (31 mi) on the NEDC, and a total of 940 km (584 mi). The plug-in hybrid can reach a top speed of 220 km/h (137 mph) and can accelerate from 0–100 km/h (62 mph) in 7.6 seconds. According to Audi the car has an average fuel efficiency of 188 mpg equivalent and CO_{2} emissions of 35 g/km.

After some delays, the A3 Sportback e-Tron went on sale across Europe in August 2014. The first 227 units were registered in Germany in August 2014. As of December 2015, global sales totaled 12,994 units, of which, 12,945 units were registered in Europe, and 49 units in the United States, where deliveries began in December 2015.

Audi discontinued the A3 PHEV Sportback e-tron in Europe in November 2018. However, the model was briefly re-introduced at the end of 2019 for the 2020 model year, called A3 Sportback 40 e-tron under Audi's new naming scheme. The revised A3 e-tron in the UK featured a different level of specification, losing the previously standard LED headlights but gaining Audi's virtual cockpit as standard. The revised model featured the same battery and drivetrain as before, rated at 22 miles of electric range under the new WLTP test.

=== S3 (2013–2020) ===
The third generation Audi S3 is powered by a 2.0 L; 121.1 cu in (1,984 cc) TFSI (turbo petrol direct injection) inline-four engine, with an output of 221 kW (300 PS; 296 bhp) at 5,500 rpm and 380 N⋅m (280 lbf⋅ft) of torque at 1,800-5,500 rpm, with its redline at 6,800 rpm. It features new pistons with stronger bolts and new rings, as well as reinforced connecting rods with new mounts transferring the power to the crankshaft. The cylinder head is made of a new lightweight aluminium alloy designed with high strength and temperature resistance in mind. It has a combined fuel economy of 23 mpg_{‑US} (10 L/100 km; 28 mpg_{‑imp}) manual; and 24 mpg_{‑US} (9.8 L/100 km; 29 mpg_{‑imp}) with S tronic.

The engine weighs in at 148 kg (326 lb), 5 kg (11 lb) lighter than the previous generation. The S3 is capable of 0–100 km/h (62 mph) in 4.8-5.2 seconds and has an electronically limited top speed of 250 km/h (155 mph).

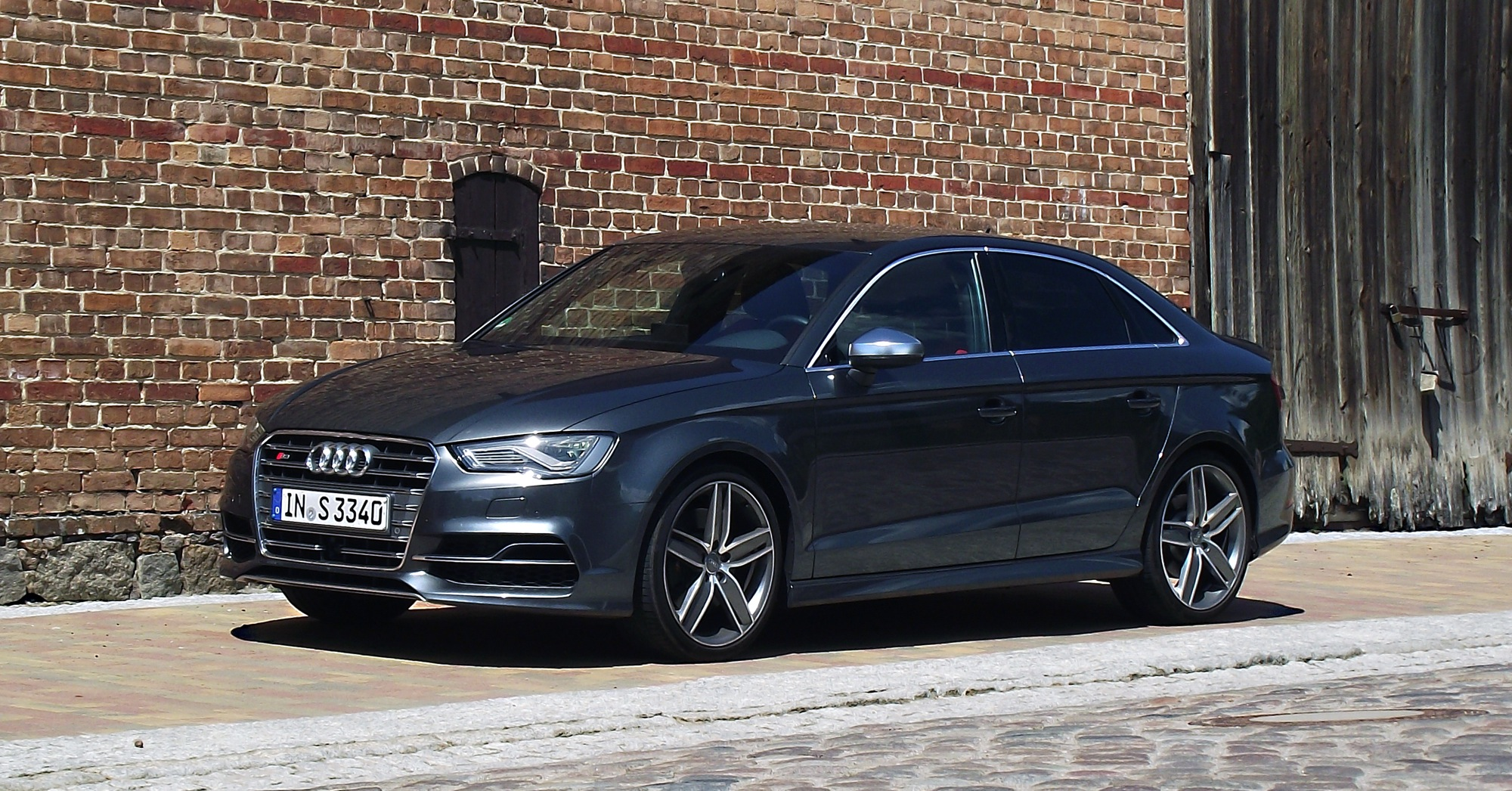
2013 Audi S3 Saloon front view (8V; pre-facelift)

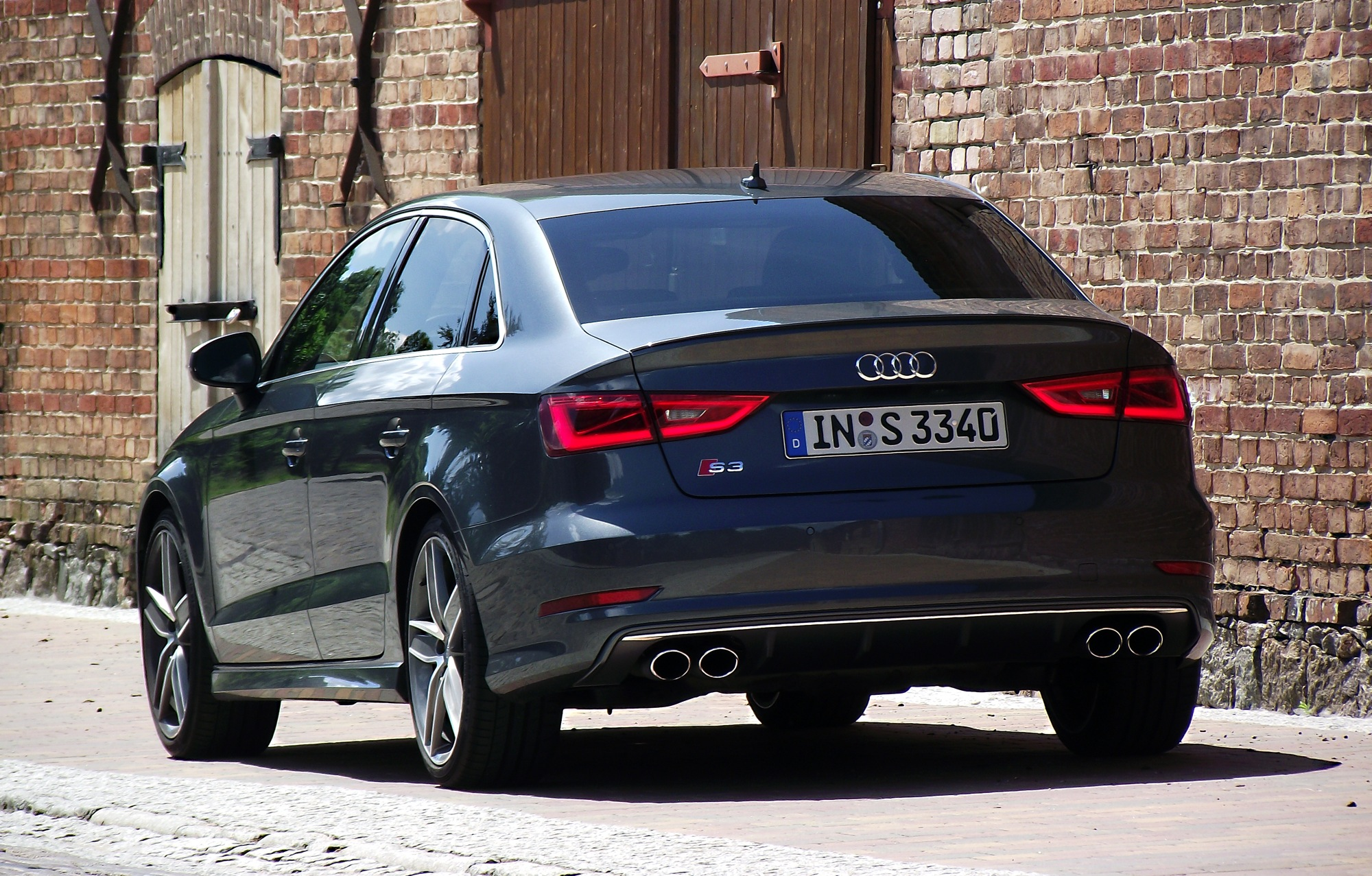
2013 Audi S3 Saloon rear view (8V; pre-facelift)

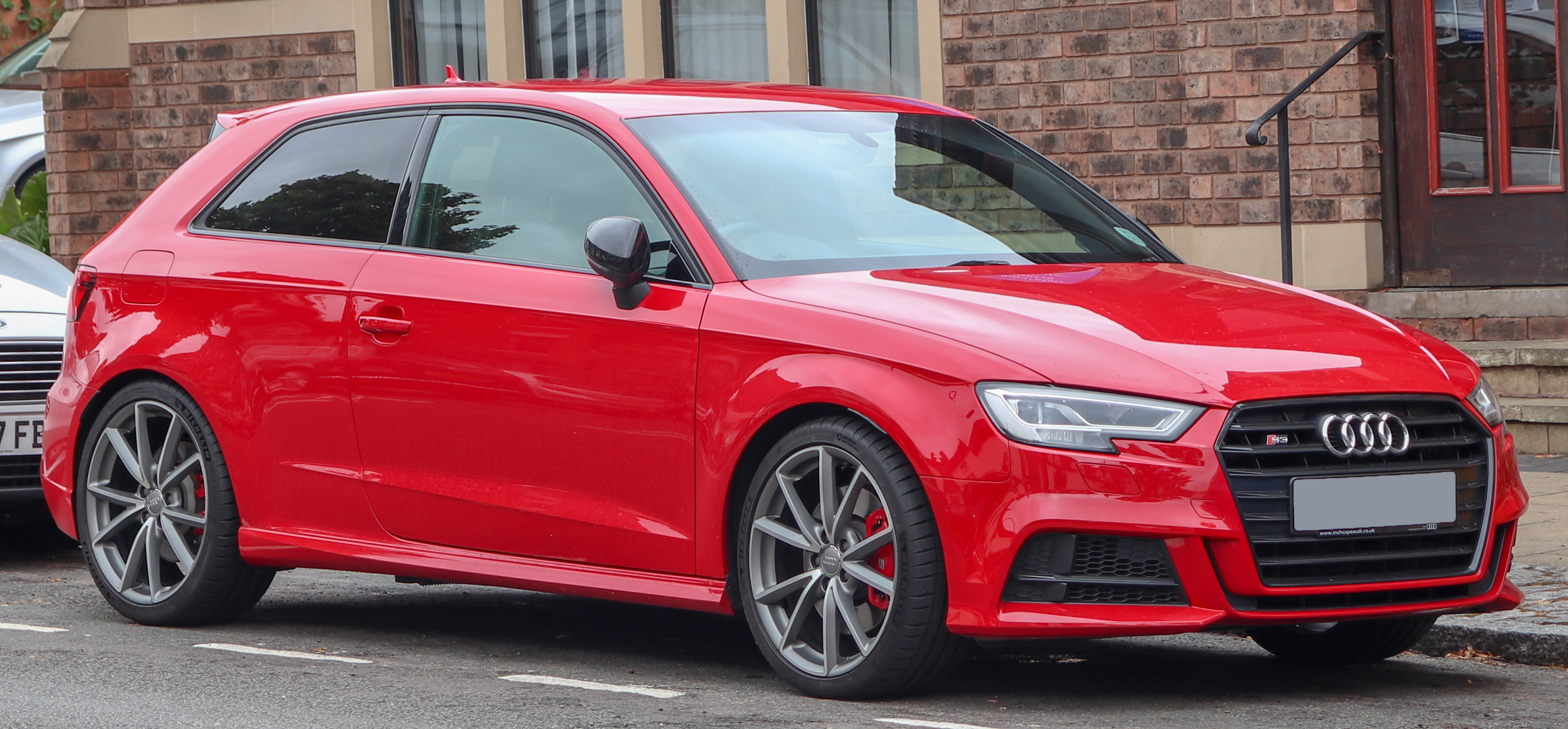
2017 Audi S3 Hatchback front view (8V; facelift)

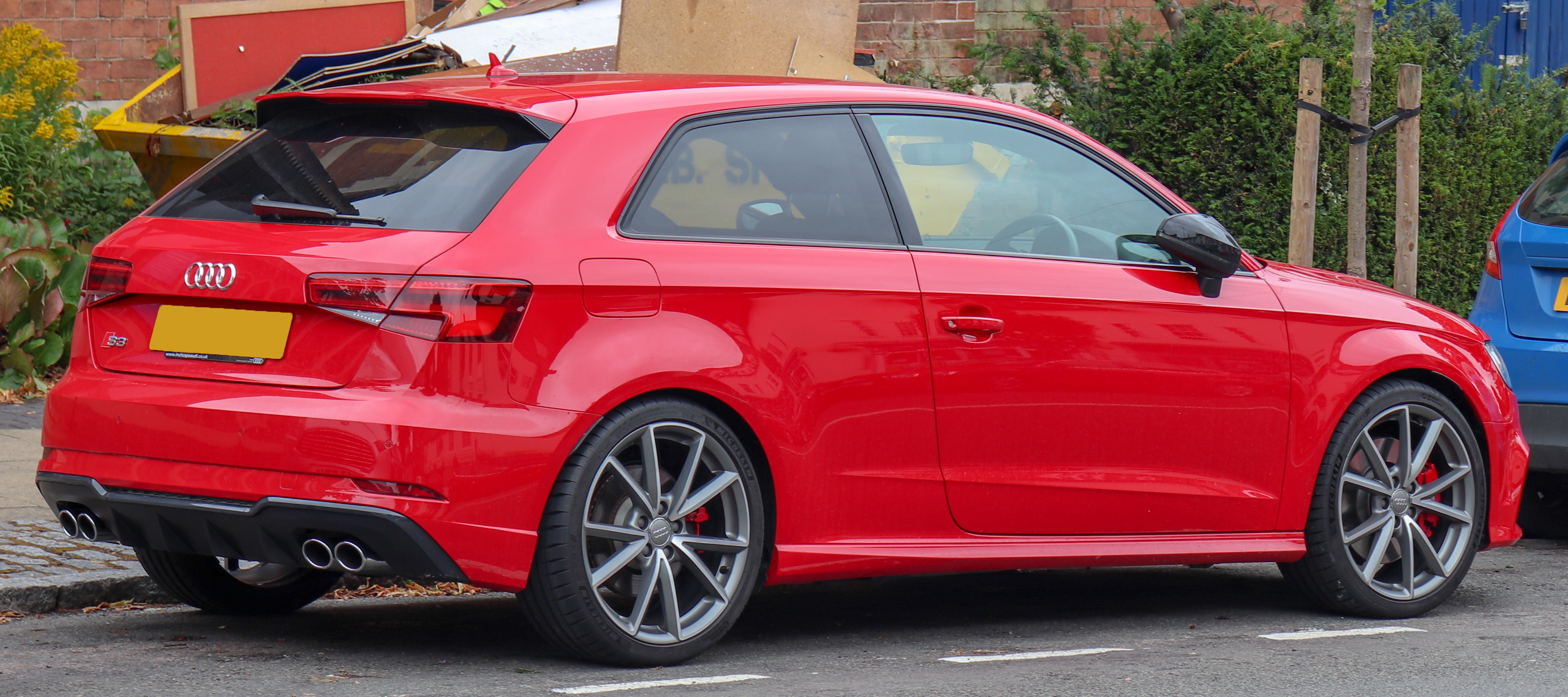
2017 Audi S3 Hatchback rear view (8V; facelift)

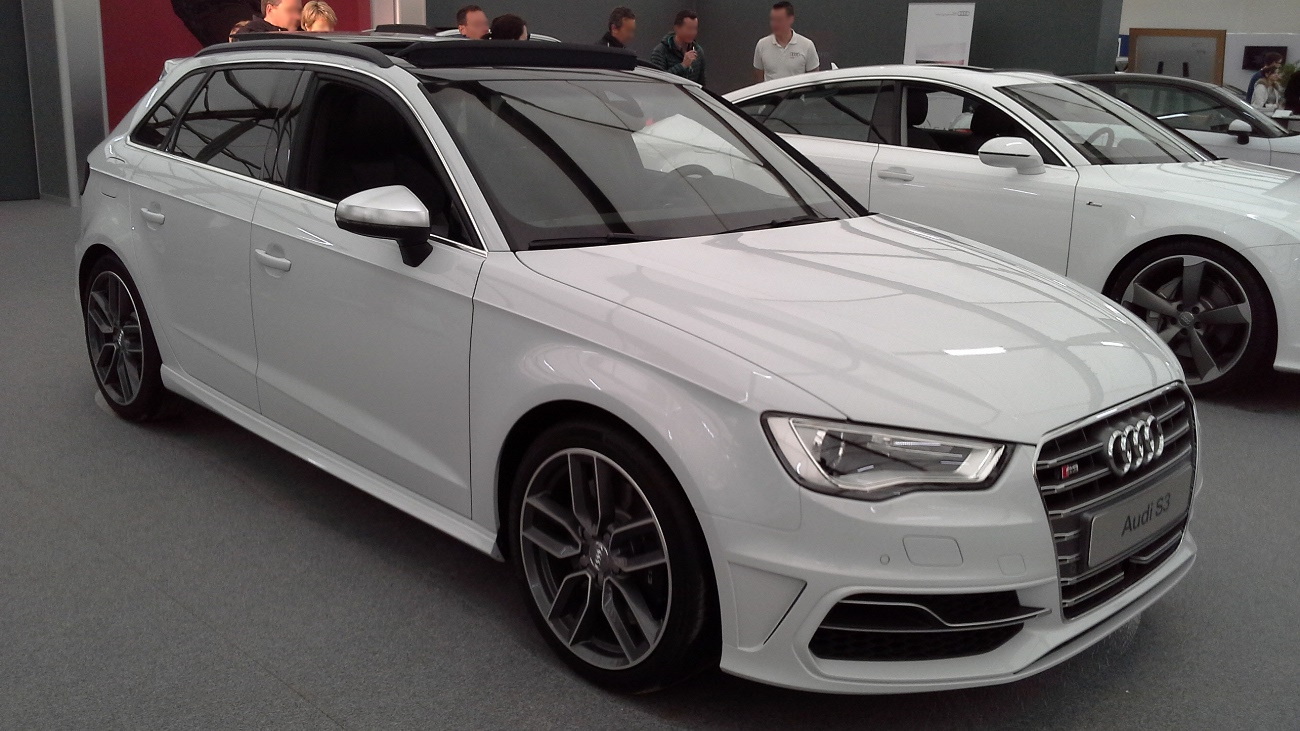
Audi S3 Sportback front view (8V; pre-facelift)

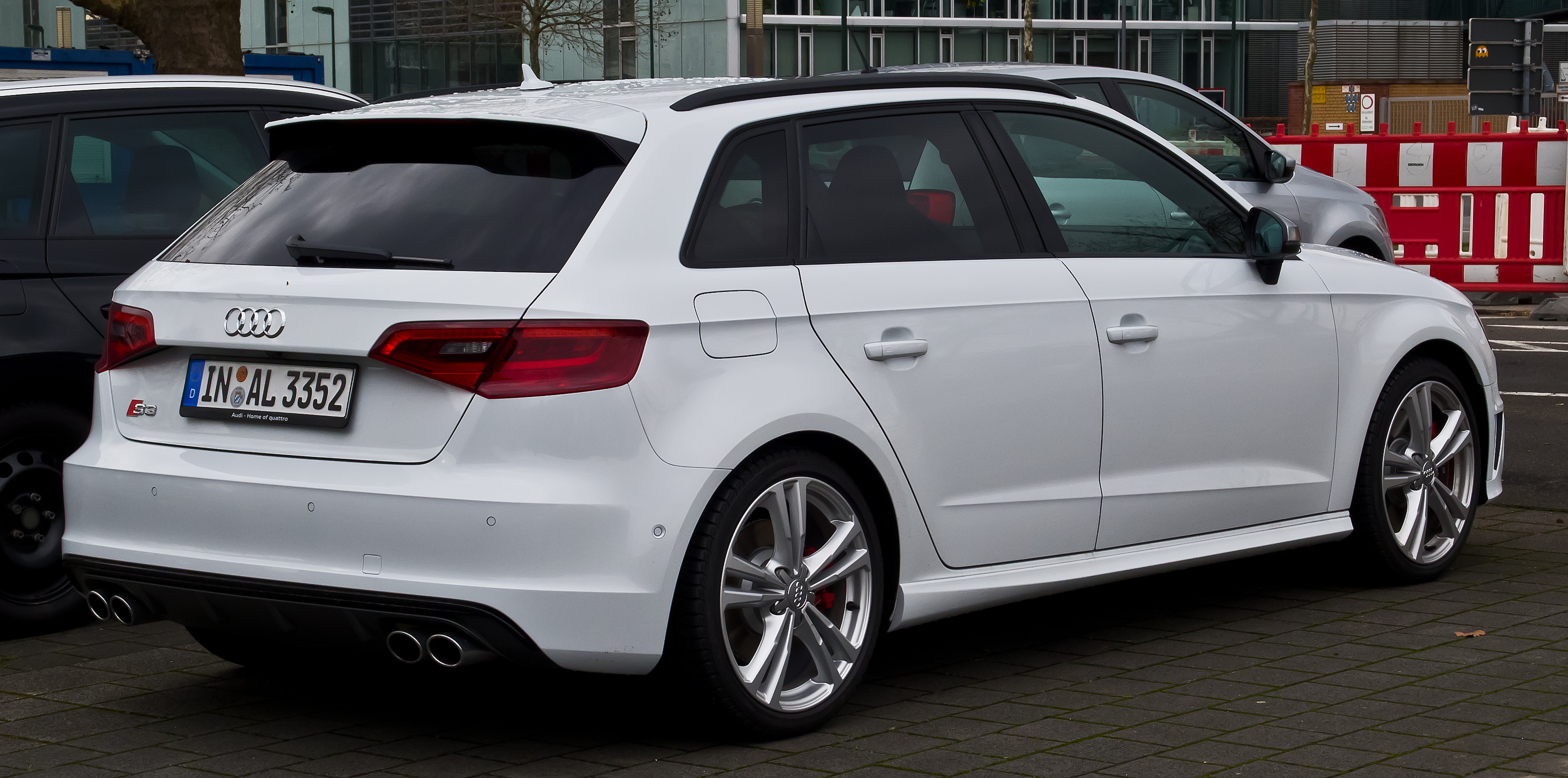
Audi S3 Sportback rear view (8V; pre-facelift)

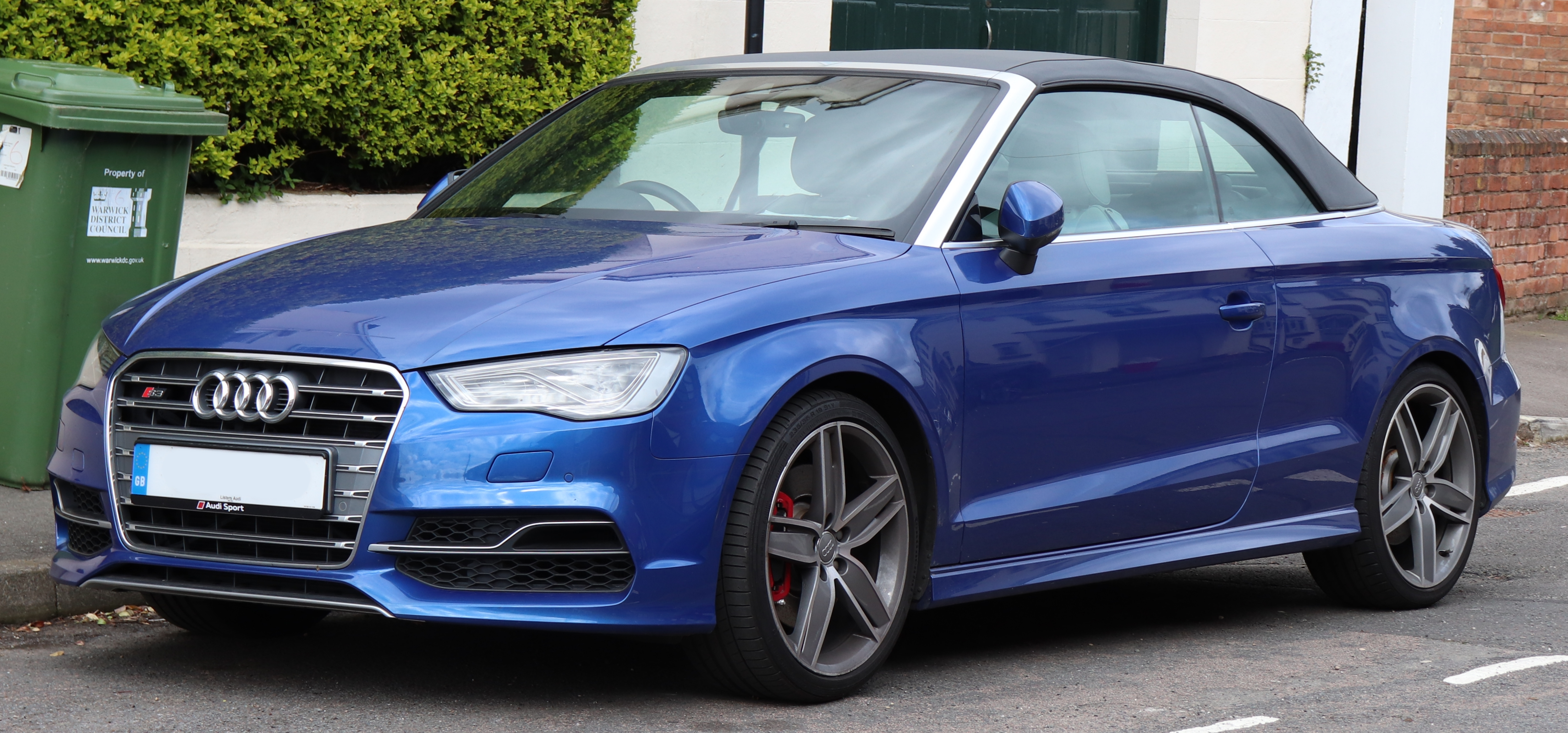
2015 Audi S3 Cabriolet front view (8V; pre-facelift)

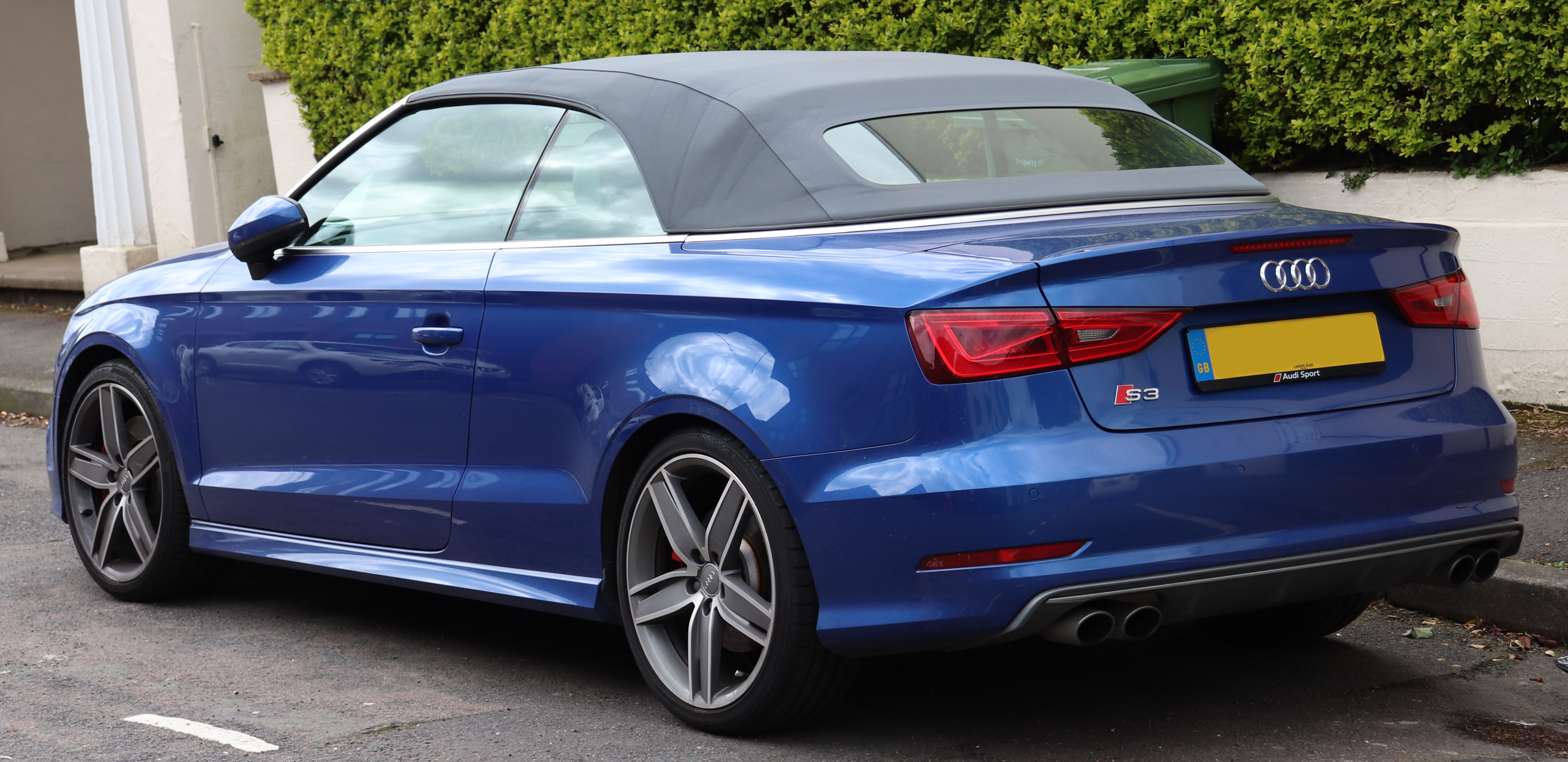
2015 Audi S3 Cabriolet rear view (8V; pre-facelift)

=== RS 3 (2015–2020) ===
Details for the RS 3 Sportback were revealed in December 2014. It went on sale in the first quarter of 2015 and featured a 2.5 litres (2,480 cc) straight-5 engine with 367 PS (270 kW; 362 hp) and 465 N⋅m (343 lbf⋅ft) of torque. The RS 3 Sportback is equipped with 7-speed dual clutch S tronic transmission and quattro all-wheel drive system. Scott Keogh of Audi of America said in April 2015 that he's "confident" we'll see the car come to the United States.

In 2017, the RS3 sedan or saloon was added to the line-up. In the same year, the RS3 was introduced to the North American market. The RS3 can be ordered with a fixed-suspension or an adjustable magnetic damper. Depending on the country, the RS3 can be purchased with different optional packages. For example, the Black Optic package includes high-gloss black 19-inch wheels, high-gloss black outside mirror covers, and a high-gloss black trunk lip spoiler, while the Dynamic package consists of titanium 19-inch wheels with summer performance tires, red brake calipers, and a sport exhaust system.

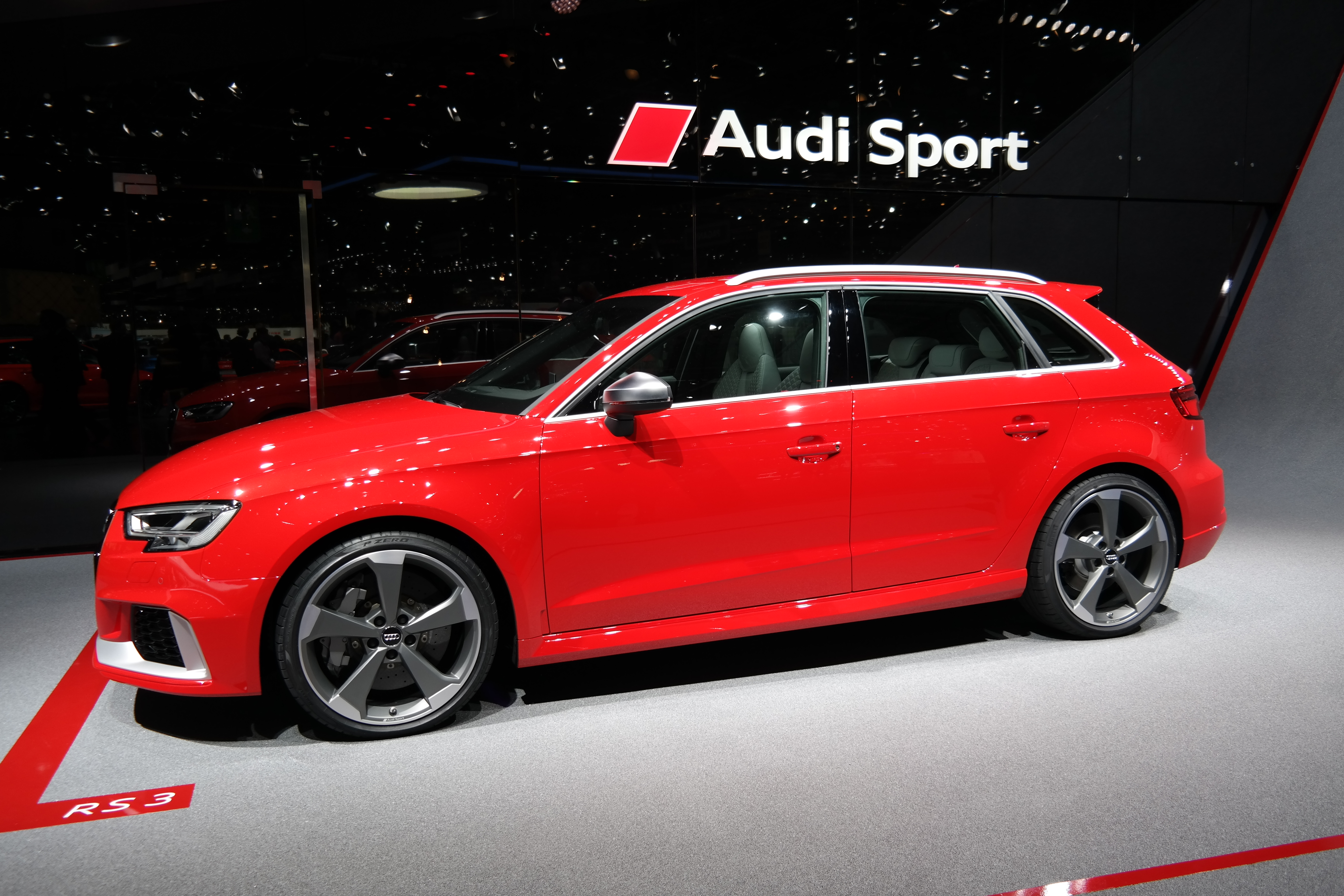
Audi RS 3 Sportback (8V) in Geneva, Switzerland

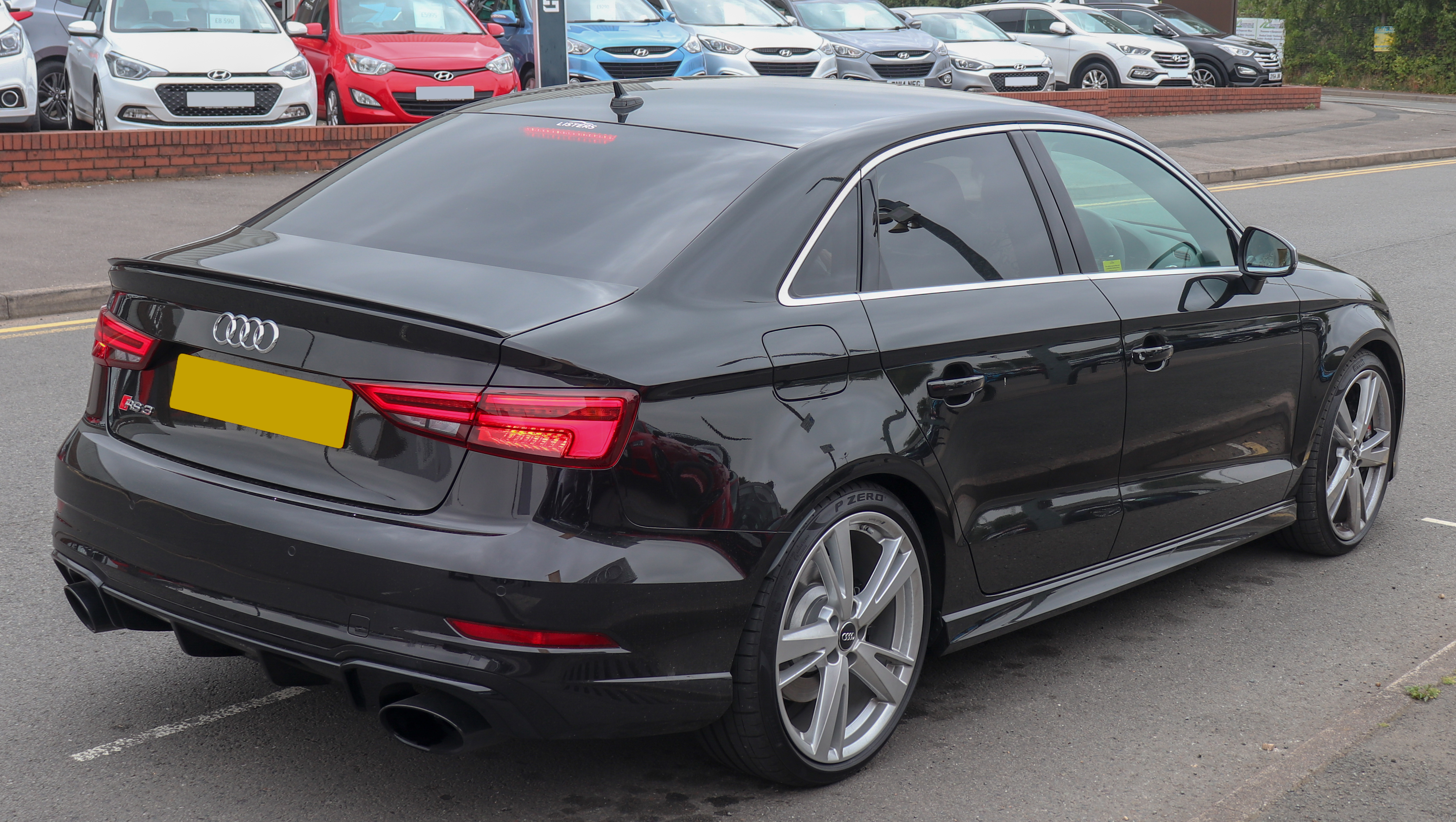
Audi RS 3 Saloon (8V) (facelift)

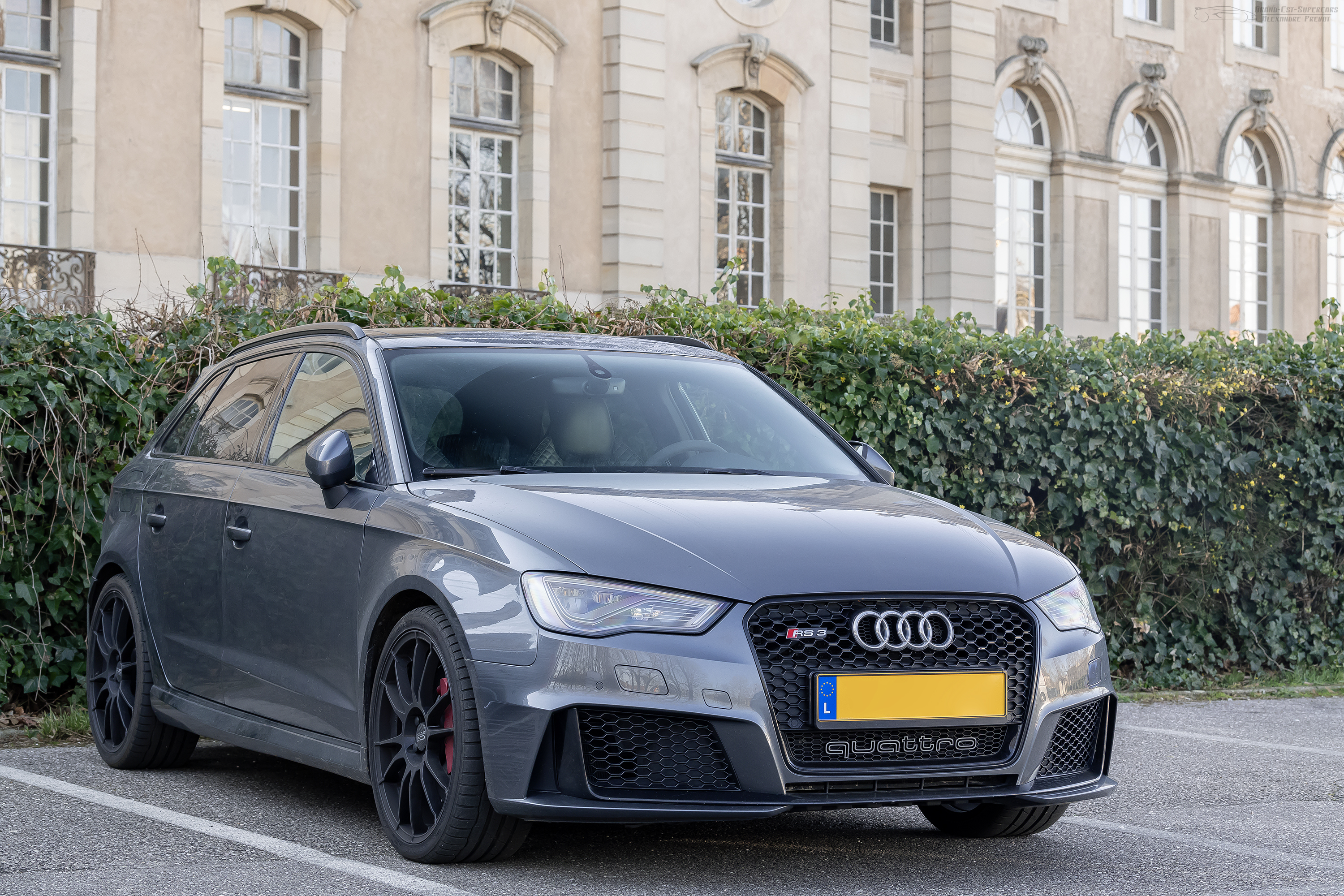
RS3 Sportback (pre-facelift)

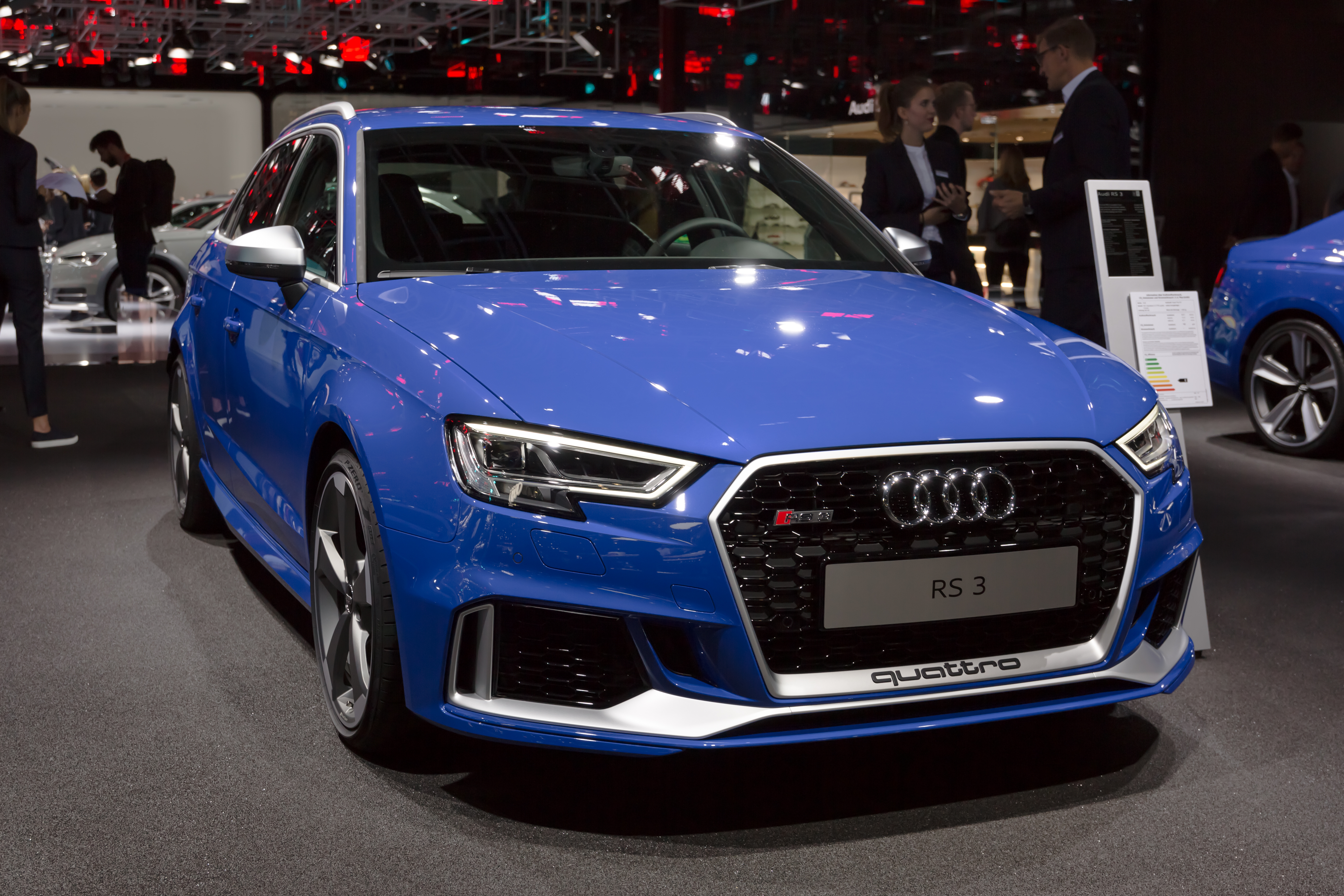
RS3 with facelifted front fascia

=== 2016 facelift ===
After four years, the third-generation Audi A3 was given a facelift for the 2017 model year, which also coincided with the 20th anniversary of the A3 name. The facelifted model was first unveiled through a set of official images in April 2016. The new A3 Saloon was given significant cosmetic updates, which were inline with the automaker's new design philosophy. As a result, the 2017 Audi A3 featured the Matrix LED headlamps that were earlier seen in the A8 flagship saloon and the R8 supercar. The rear taillights also received an optional sequentially animated turn-signal treatment. The front grille was also given a refreshed treatment that made the A3 look like the A4. Changes on the sides and rear were minimal, with only the taillights getting optional LEDs. There were multiple updates on the interior as well, with a fully digital 12.3-inch instrument cluster screen placed behind a revised steering wheel available as an optional upgrade. Optional features included Apple Carplay and Android Auto, and a suite of driver's assistance features. Sold in Europe and released in the United States for the 2017 model year.

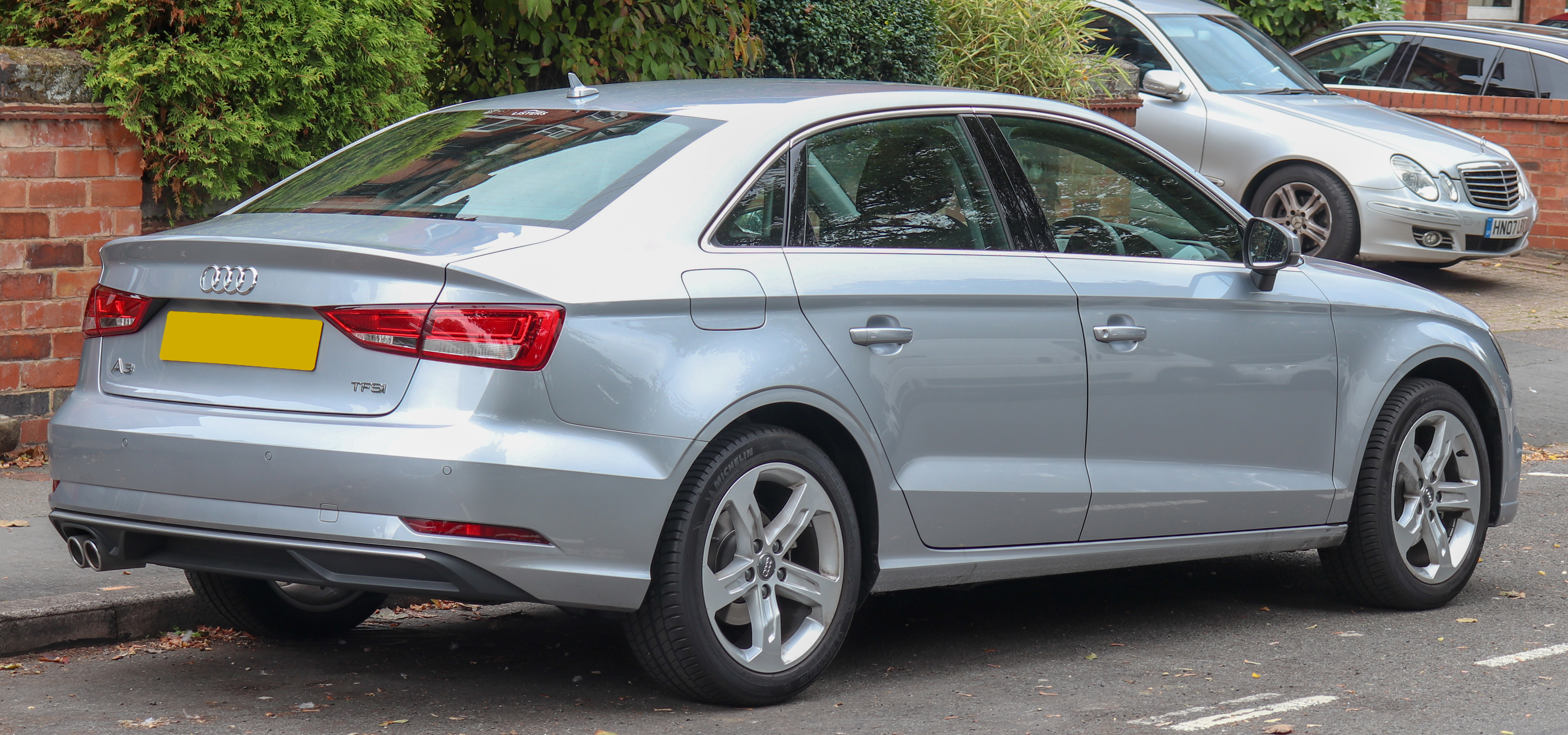
2016 facelift Audi A3 Saloon

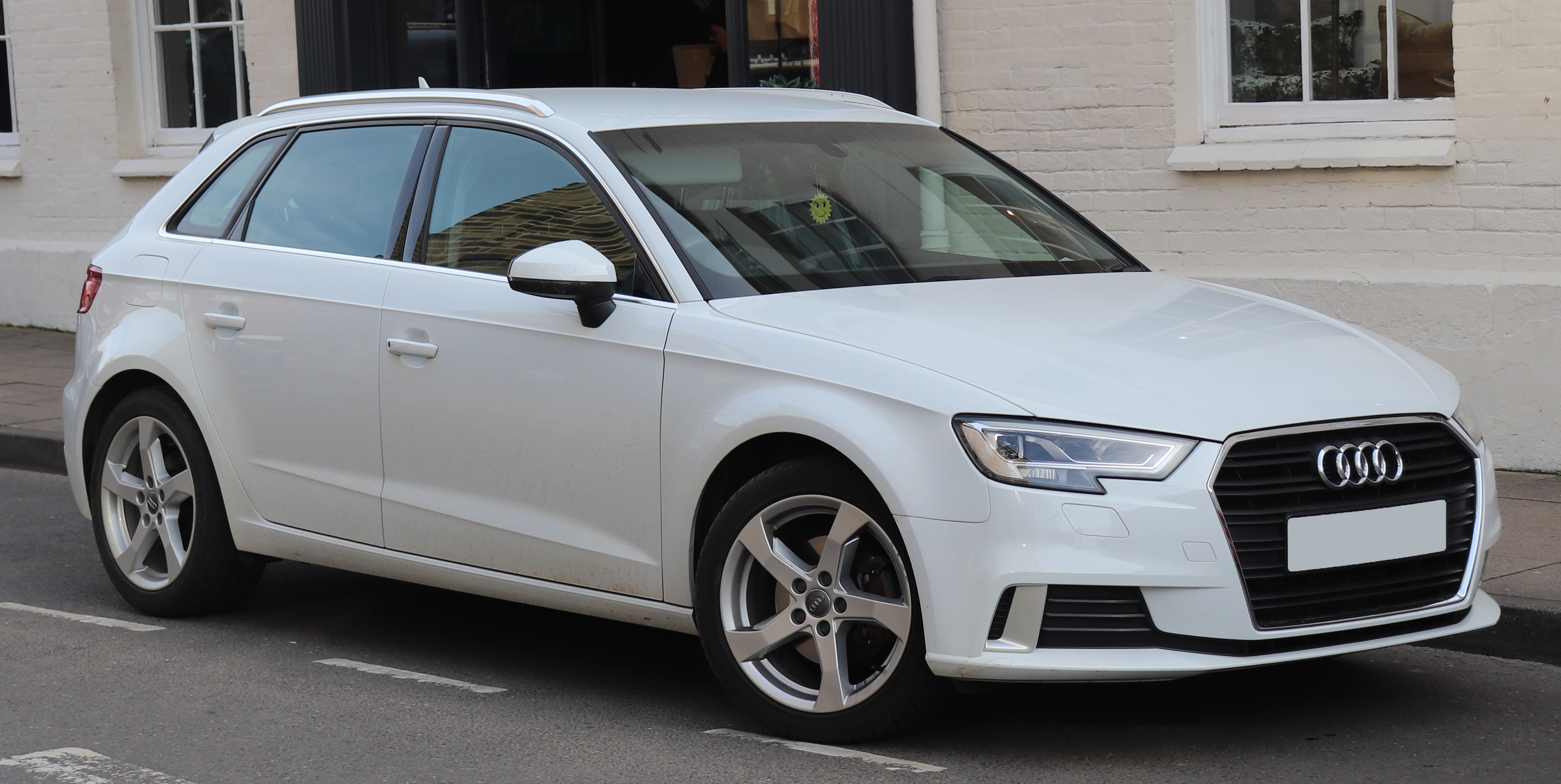
2016 facelift Audi A3 Sportback

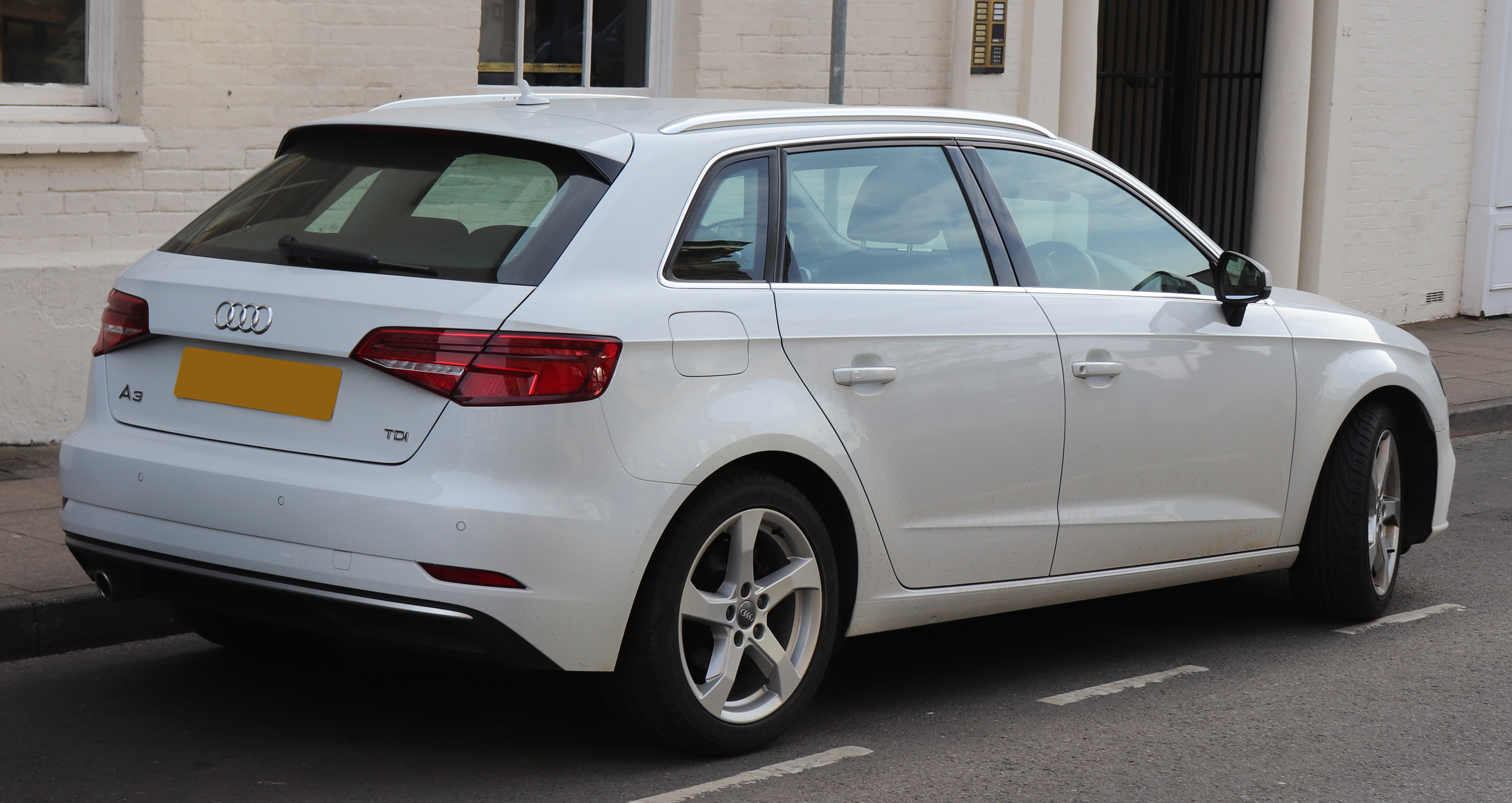
2016 facelift Audi A3 Sportback

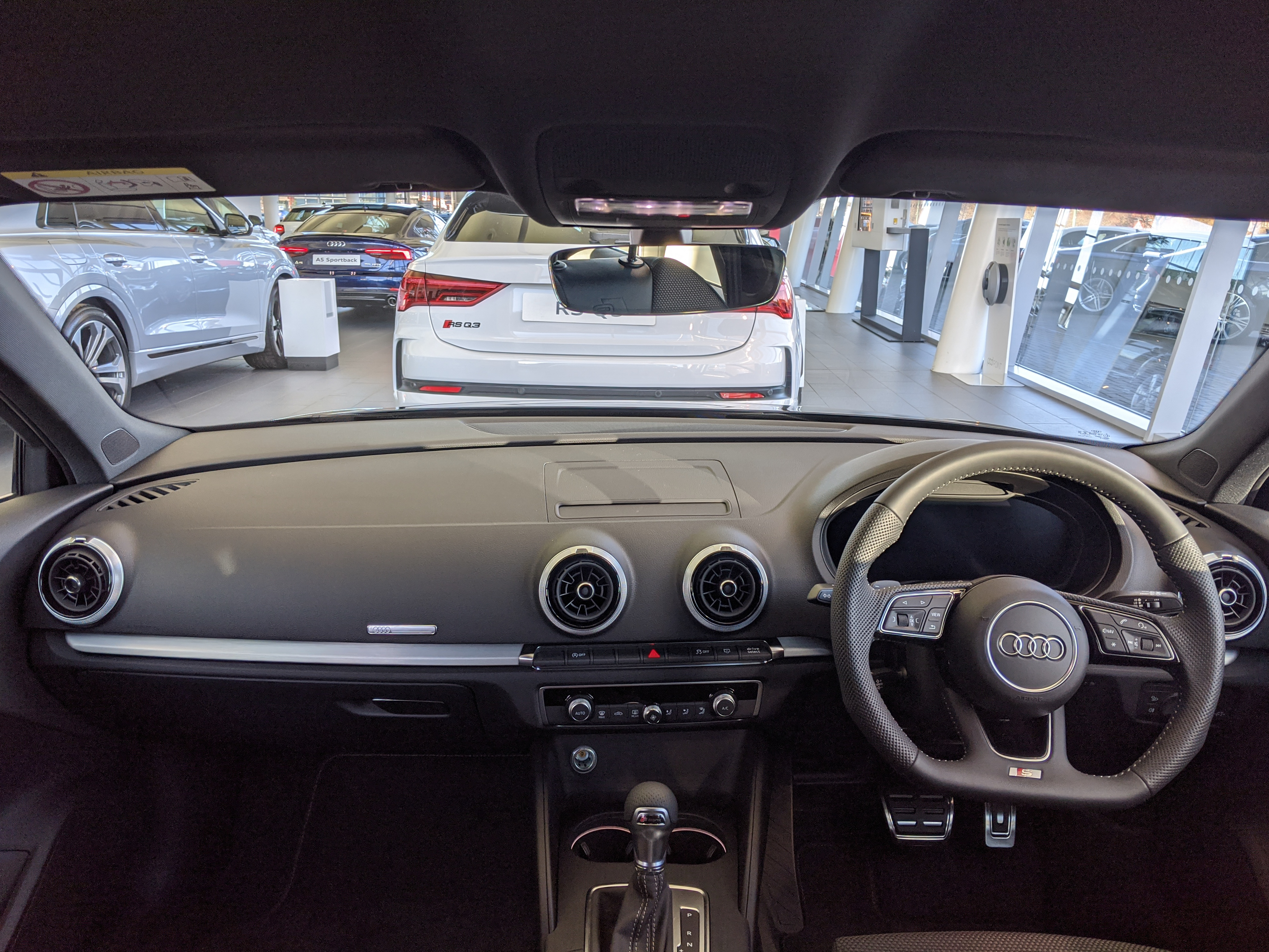
2016 facelift Audi A3 Sportback interior

=== Safety ===
ANCAP test results Audi A3 2WD variants only (2020, aligned with Euro NCAP)
Test	Points	%
Overall:	5 /5 stars	
Adult occupant:	34.12	89%
Child occupant:	39.73	81%
Pedestrian:	36.76	68%
Safety assist:	11.82	73%

Euro NCAP tested a third-generation Audi A3, 3-door hatchback with front airbags, side airbags, seatbelt pretensioners and load limiters as standard and scored it accordingly:

Euro NCAP test results* Audi A3 LHD, 3-door hatchback (2012)
Test	Points	%
Overall:	5 /5 stars	
Adult occupant:	34	95%
Child occupant:	42	87%
Pedestrian:	27	74%
Safety assist:	6	86%

=== Engines ===
Petrol engine
Model	Years	Engine displacement	Engine code	Power	Torque	0–100 km/h (0–62 mph)	Top speed	Transmission	
Model	Years	Engine displacement	Engine code	Power	Torque	0–100 km/h (0–62 mph)	Top speed	Standard	Optional
A3 1.4 TFSI g-tron	2014–2019	1395 cc I4	CPWA	110 PS (81 kW; 108 hp) at 4,800-6,000 rpm	200 N⋅m (148 lb⋅ft) at 1,500-3,500 rpm	10.8 s	197 km/h (122 mph)	6-spd manual	7-spd S tronic
A3 1.0 TFSI / 30 TFSI	2016–2020	999 cc I3	CHZD, DKRF	116 PS (85 kW; 114 hp) at 5,000-5,500 rpm	200 N⋅m (148 lbf⋅ft) at 2,000-3,500 rpm	9.9 s	206 km/h (128 mph)	6-spd manual	7-spd S tronic
A3 1.2 TFSI	2013–2018	1197 cc I4	CJZA, CYVB	105 PS (77 kW; 104 hp) at 5,000 rpm	175 N⋅m (129 lbf⋅ft) at 1,400–3,500 rpm	10.3 s	193 km/h (120 mph)	6-spd manual	7-spd S tronic
A3 1.4 TFSI	2013–2018	1395 cc I4	CXSB, CZC, CZCA	125 PS (92 kW; 123 hp) at 5,000–6,000 rpm	200 N⋅m (148 lbf⋅ft) at 1,400–4,000 rpm	9.3 s	203 km/h (126 mph)	6-spd manual	7-spd S tronic
A3 1.4 TFSI	2013–2018	1395 cc I4	CZEA	150 PS (110 kW; 148 hp) at 5,000–6,000 rpm	250 N⋅m (184 lbf⋅ft) at 1,500–3,500 rpm	8.3 s	212 km/h (132 mph)	6-spd manual	7-spd S tronic
A3 1.4 TFSI e-tron (40 e-tron)	2013–2018 (2020)	1395 cc I4 & 75 kW motor	CUKB	204 PS (150 kW; 201 hp) at 5,000–6,000 rpm	350 N⋅m (258 lb⋅ft) at 1,600–3,500 rpm	7.6 s	222 km/h (138 mph)	6-spd S tronic	N/A
A3 1.5 TFSI / 35 TFSI (Note: with cylinder on demand)	2017–2020	1498 cc I4	DADA	150 PS (110 kW; 148 hp) at 5,000–6,000 rpm	250 N⋅m (184 lbf⋅ft) at 1,500–3,500 rpm	8.2 s	218 km/h (135 mph)	6-spd manual	7-spd S tronic
A3 1.8 TFSI	2013–2016	1798 cc I4	CJSA (FWD) CJSB (Quattro)	180 PS (132 kW; 178 hp) at 5,100–6,200 rpm	250 N⋅m (184 lbf⋅ft) at 1,250–5,000 rpm	7.2 s	232 km/h (144 mph)	6-spd manual; 6-spd S tronic	7-spd S tronic
A3 2.0 TFSI / 40 TFSI	2015–2020	1984 cc I4	CHHB	220 PS (162 kW; 217 hp) at 4,500–6,200 rpm	350 N⋅m (258 lbf⋅ft) at 1,600–4,400 rpm	5.8 s	232 km/h (144 mph)	6-spd S tronic	N/A
S3 2.0 TFSI	2013–2016	1984 cc I4	CJXC	300 PS (221 kW; 296 hp) at 5,500–6,200 rpm	380 N⋅m (280 lbf⋅ft) at 1,800–5,500 rpm	4.6 s (Note: S tronic)	249 km/h (155 mph)	6-spd manual	6-spd S tronic (Note: 2017–present)
S3 2.0 TFSI	2016–2018	1984 cc I4	CJXG / DJHA	310 PS (228 kW; 306 hp) at 5,500–6,200 rpm	380 N⋅m (280 lbf⋅ft) at 1,800–5,500 rpm	4.6 s	249 km/h (155 mph)	6-spd manual	7-spd S tronic
S3 2.0 TFSI	2019–2020	1984 cc I4	DNUE	300 PS (221 kW; 296 hp) at 5,300–6,500 rpm	400 N⋅m (295 lbf⋅ft) at 2,000–5,200 rpm	4.7 s	250 km/h (160 mph)	7-spd S tronic (Note: 2019–present)	N/A
RS 3 2.5 TFSI	2015–2016	2480 cc I5	CZGB	367 PS (270 kW; 362 hp) at 5,550–6,800 rpm	465 N⋅m (343 lbf⋅ft) at 1,625–5,550 rpm	4.3 s	280 km/h (174 mph)	7-spd S tronic	N/A
RS 3 2.5 TFSI	2017–2018	2480 cc I5	DAZA	400 PS (294 kW; 395 hp) at 5,850–7,000 rpm	480 N⋅m (354 lbf⋅ft) at 1,700–5,850 rpm	4.1 s	280 km/h (174 mph)	7-spd S tronic	N/A
RS 3 2.5 TFSI	2019–2020	2480 cc I5	DNWA	400 PS (294 kW; 395 hp) at 5,850–7,000 rpm	480 N⋅m (354 lbf⋅ft) at 1,950–5,850 rpm	3.8 s	280 km/h (174 mph)	7-spd S tronic	N/A

Diesel engine
Model	Years	Engine	Engine code	Power	Torque	0–100 km/h (0–62 mph)	Top speed	Transmission	
Model	Years	Engine	Engine code	Power	Torque	0–100 km/h (0–62 mph)	Top speed	Standard	Optional
A3 1.6 TDI	2013–2017	1598 cc I4	CLHA (105); CXXB (110)	105 PS (77 kW; 104 hp) at 3,000–4,000 rpm 110 PS (81 kW; 108 hp) at 3,000–4,000 rpm	230 N⋅m (170 lb⋅ft) at 1,500–2,750 rpm	10.5 s	202 km/h (126 mph)	6-spd manual	6-spd S tronic
A3 1.6 TDI / 30 TDI	2017–2020	1598 cc I4	DDYA	115 PS (85 kW; 113 hp) at 3,000-4,000 rpm	250 N⋅m (184 lbf⋅ft) at 1,500–2,750 rpm	9.8 s	202 km/h (126 mph)	6-spd manual	7-spd S tronic
A3 2.0 TDI / 35 TDI	2013–2020	1968 cc I4	CRBC, CRLB, CRUA, DBGA, DCYA, DEJA	150 PS (110 kW; 148 hp) at 3,500–4,000 rpm	320 N⋅m (236 lbf⋅ft) at 1,750–3,000 rpm	8.6 s	213 km/h (132 mph)	6-spd manual	6-spd S tronic
A3 2.0 TDI / 40 TDI	2013–2020	1968 cc I4	CUNA, DGCA	184 PS (135 kW; 181 hp) at 3,500–4,000 rpm	380 N⋅m (280 lbf⋅ft) at 1,750–3,250 rpm	7.3 s	230 km/h (143 mph)	6-spd manual	6-spd S tronic

== Fourth generation (Typ 8Y; 2020) ==
Fourth generation
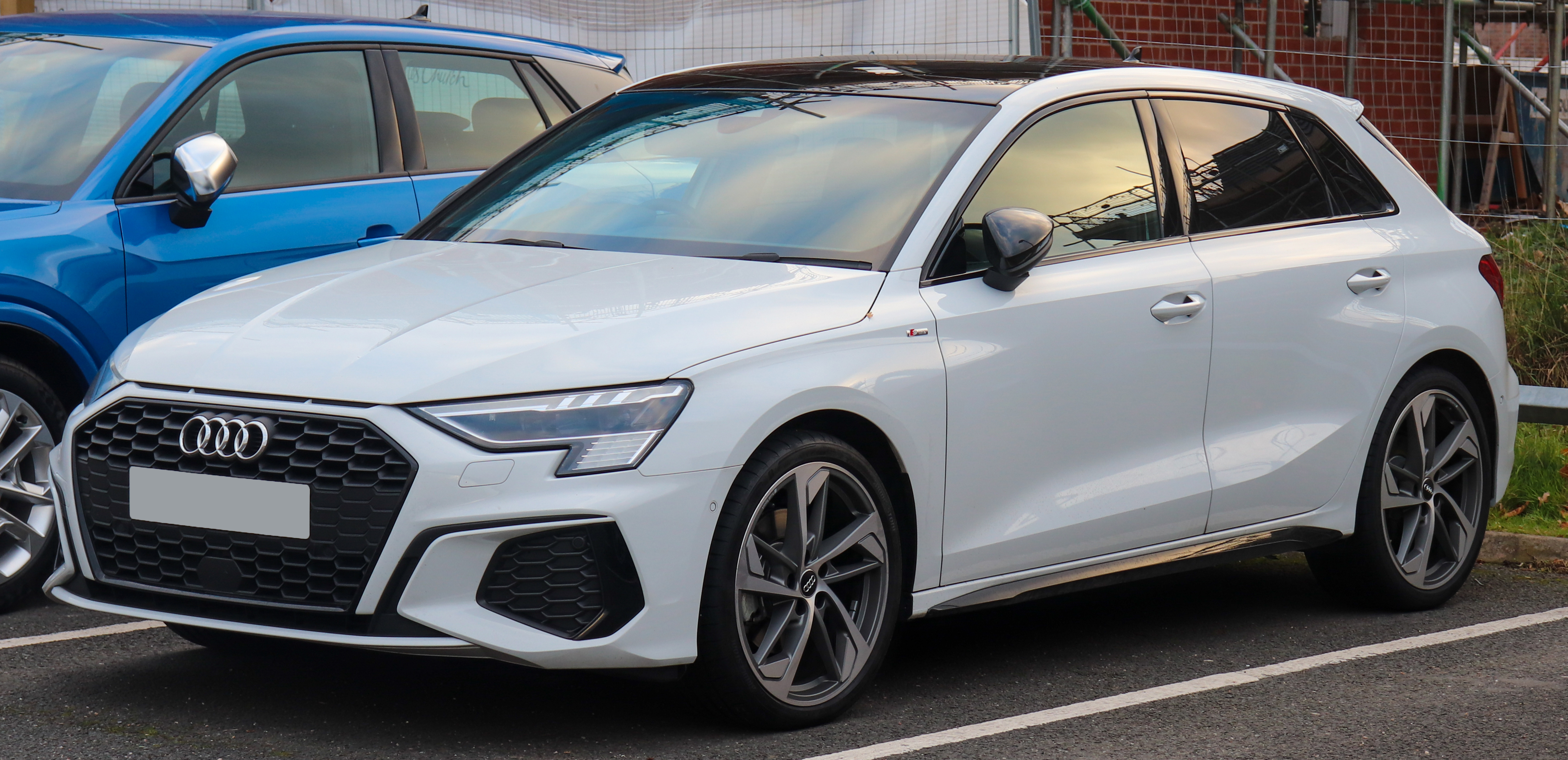
- Audi A3 Sportback

Overview
- Model code: 8Y
- Production: May 2020–present
- Model years: 2022–present
- Assembly: Germany: Ingolstadt (Audi AG Werk Ingolstadt); China: Qingdao (FAW-VW Automotive Co. Ltd, A3L)
- Designer: Jakob Hirzel, Juan Carlos Huerta

Body and chassis
- Body style: 5-door hatchback (Sportback); 4-door saloon
- Platform: Volkswagen Group MQB Evo
- Related: Volkswagen Golf Mk8; SEAT León Mk4; Škoda Octavia Mk4

Powertrain
- Engine: Inline-three petrol engine: 1.0 L EA211 CHYB turbo; Inline-four petrol hybrid engine: 1.4 L EA211 I4 t/c ACDT PHEV System; 1.5 L EA211 Evo turbo I4 (mild hybrid); 1.5 L EA211 Evo turbo I4 (PHEV); 2.0 L EA888 evo 2 turbo I4 (S3); Inline-four Bi-Fuel (Petrol/CNG) engine: 1.5 L EA211 TGI Evo turbo I4 (30 g-tron); Straight-five engine: 2.5 L EA855 R5 turbo I5 TFSI; Inline-four diesel engine: 2.0 L EA288 evo 4 TDI
- Electric motor: 48 Volt belt-drive alternator starter (MHEV); 81 kW (110 PS; 109 hp) – 85 kW (116 PS; 114 hp) Permanent magnet AC synchronous motor
- Transmission: 6-speed manual MQ350; 7-speed S-tronic DQ381
- Hybrid drivetrain: MHEV; PHEV
- Battery: 13 kWh Li-ion

Dimensions
- Wheelbase: 2,640 mm (103.9 in) (sportback); 2,636 mm (103.8 in) (sedan); 2,680 mm (105.5 in) (A3L)
- Length: 4,337 mm (170.7 in) (sportback); 4,495 mm (177.0 in) (sedan); 4,548 mm (179.1 in) (A3L)
- Width: 1,816 mm (71.5 in)
- Height: 1,425 mm (56.1 in)
- Kerb weight: 1,651 kg (3,639 lb) RS3

The fourth-generation A3 was unveiled on 3 March 2020 as the Sportback model, and the Saloon model was later unveiled on 21 April 2020.

The new exterior and interior styling is heavily inspired by Lamborghini, LED headlights and taillights, with the option of Matrix LED headlights. It shares the MQB evo platform with other Audi models, and with the Volkswagen Golf Mk8, SEAT Leon Mk4, and Škoda Octavia Mk4.

It is 3 centimetres longer and wider when compared to the outgoing model while keeping the wheelbase length the same, trunk cargo space is 380 litres with the seats up, and 1200 litres with the seats folded down. It has a drag coefficient of 0.28, and is powered by 1.0-litre 3-cylinder petrol turbocharged engine with 110 hp, 1.5-litre with 150 hp, 2.0-litre TDI with 116 hp or 150 hp.

There is also a new 2.0-litre Quattro version in both petrol and diesel variants. It produces 190 hp (142 kW) and 320 N⋅m (236 lbf⋅ft) of torque (400 Nm for the diesel variant). It also has reduced cargo space (320 litres instead of the 380 litres in the other A3 variants) due to the Quattro four-wheel-drive system.

The S3 model has the same 2.0L petrol engine from the previous generation, producing 310 hp (231 kW) and 400 N⋅m (295 lbf⋅ft) of torque, but this time is only available with an automatic gearbox. Similarly it has reduced cargo space due to the Quattro four-wheel-drive system. In the United States, the S3 is equipped with the newer EA888.4 2.0L engine shared with the Mk8 Golf R, rated at 306 hp (228 kW) and 400 N⋅m (295 lbf⋅ft).

Like the previous generation, the new S3 also comes as a saloon/sedan.

This generation of the A3 Sedan is not expected to arrive in North America until late 2021, as a 2022 model. The A3 Sportback e-tron, or any other variant of the A3 Sportback, will not be sold anymore in North America. In countries where the PHEV variant of the A3 Sportback will be sold, it will no longer be called the e-tron because this name is reserved for electric Audi cars. Instead, it is called TFSIe. There are two versions, the "40 TFSIe" and the "45 TSFIe". The former has a 0–62 mph (0–100 km/h) time of 7.4 sec, while the latter is based on the Golf GTE and has a 0–62 mph (0–100 km/h) time of 6.3 s.

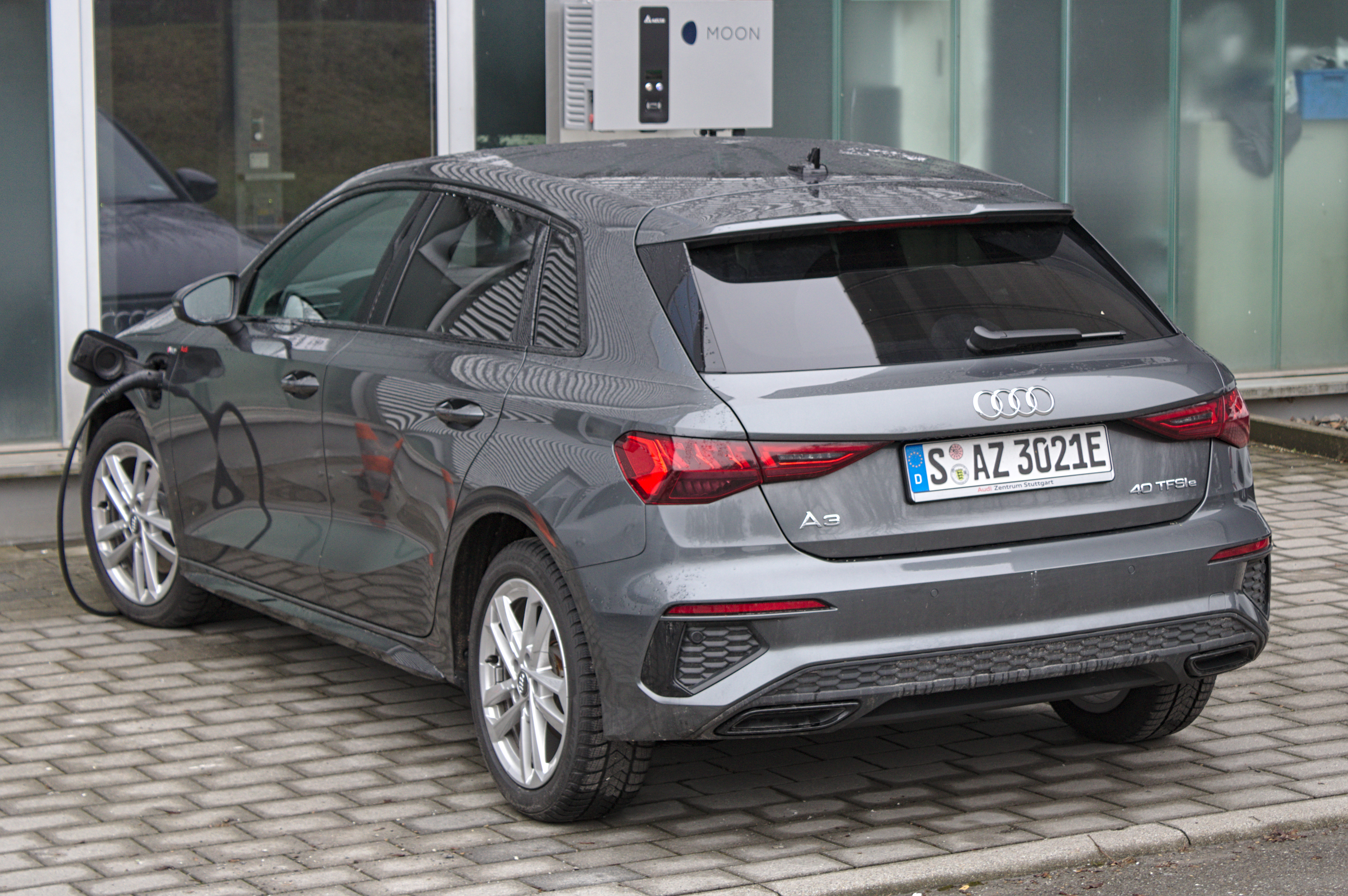
Rear view

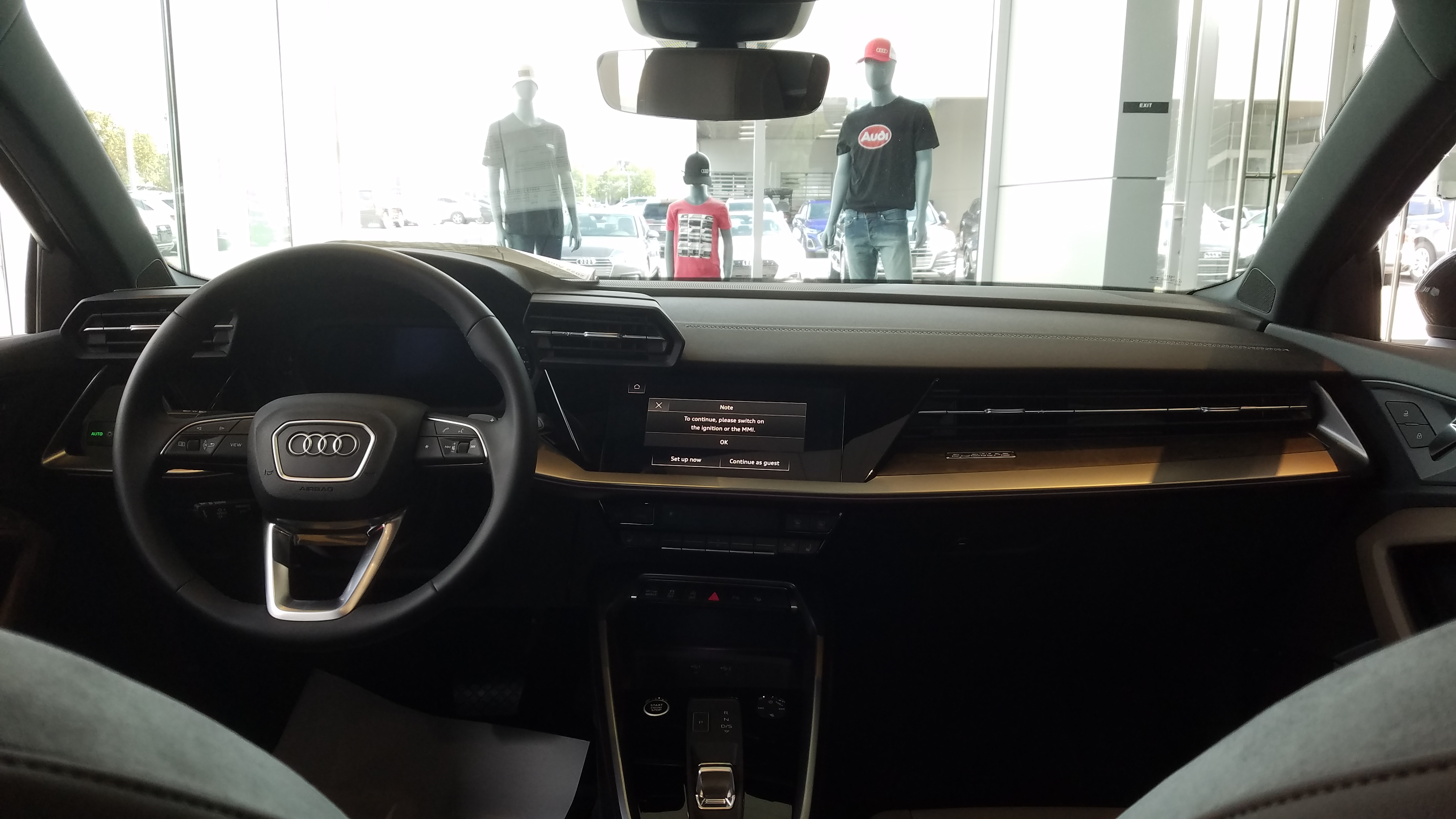
Interior

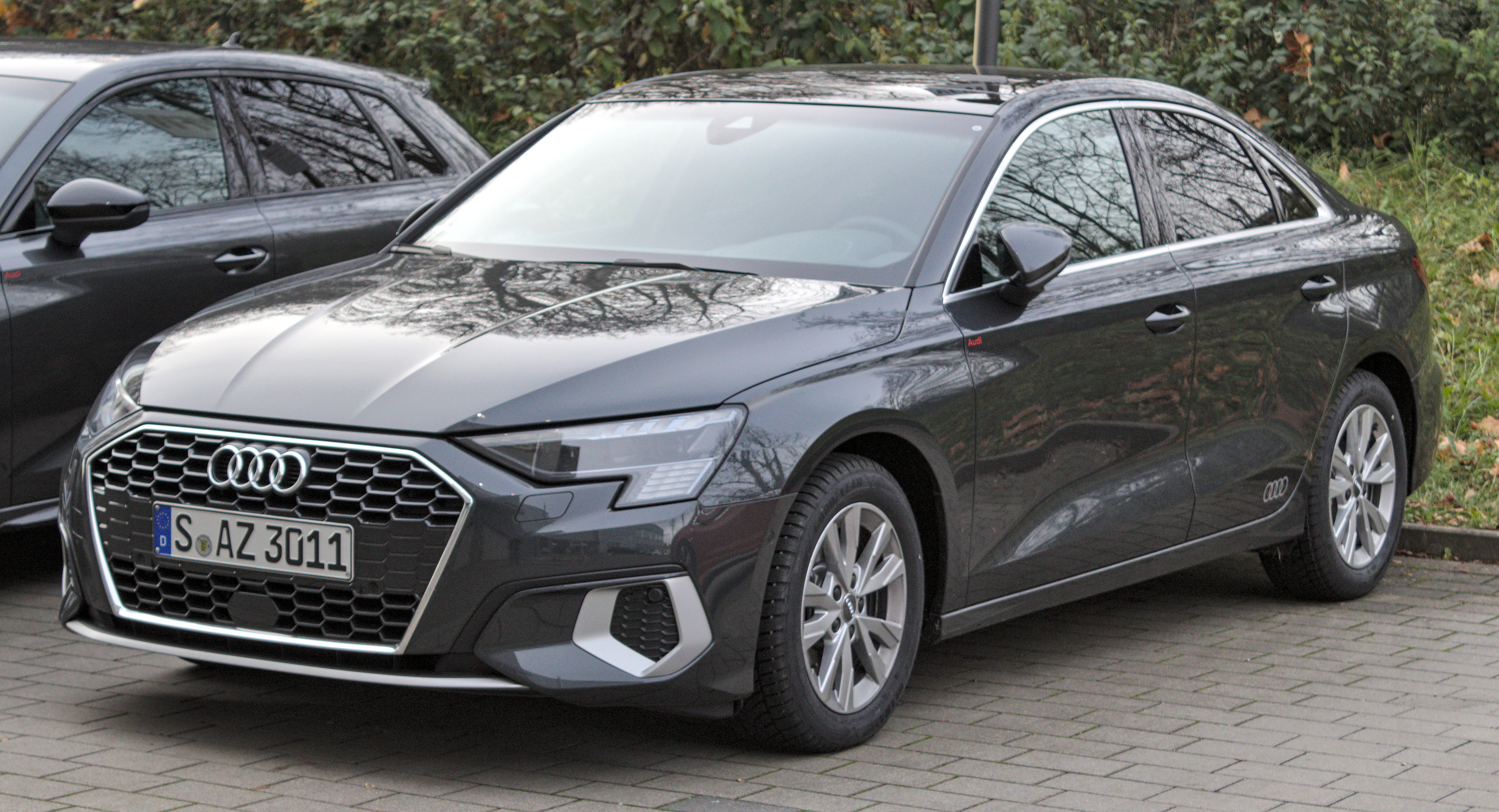
Audi A3 Saloon front view

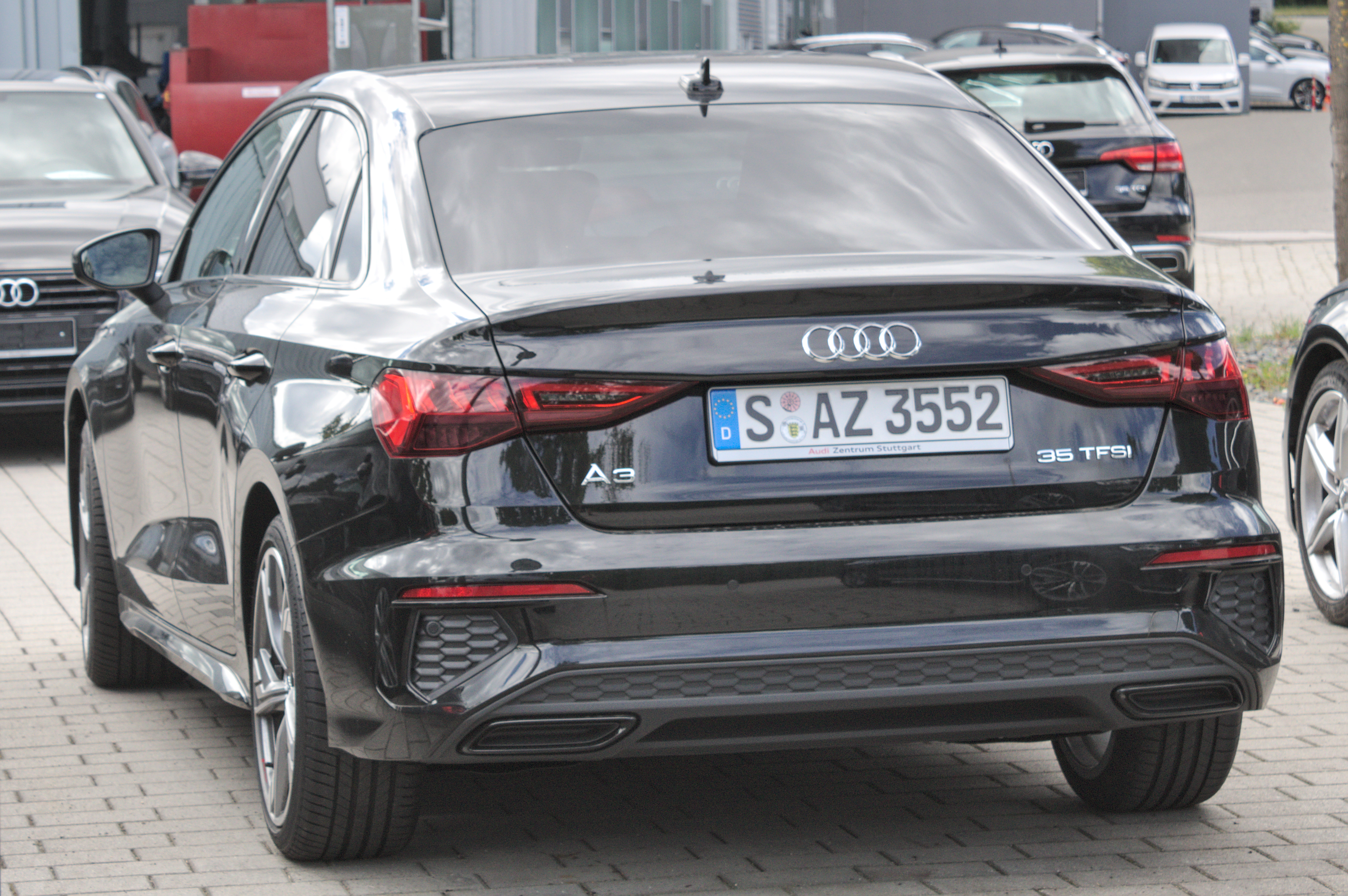
Audi A3 Saloon rear view

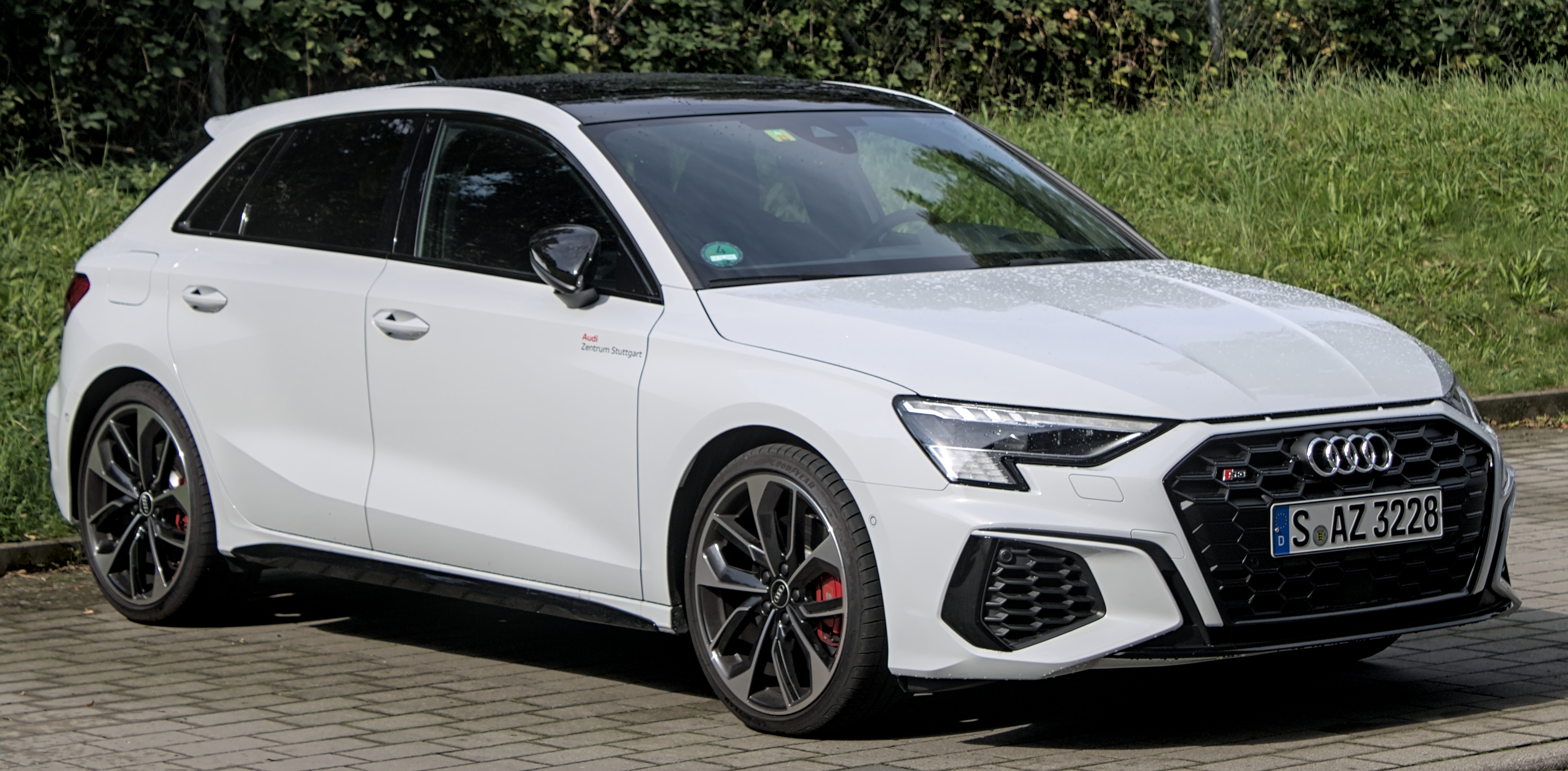
Audi S3 Sportback

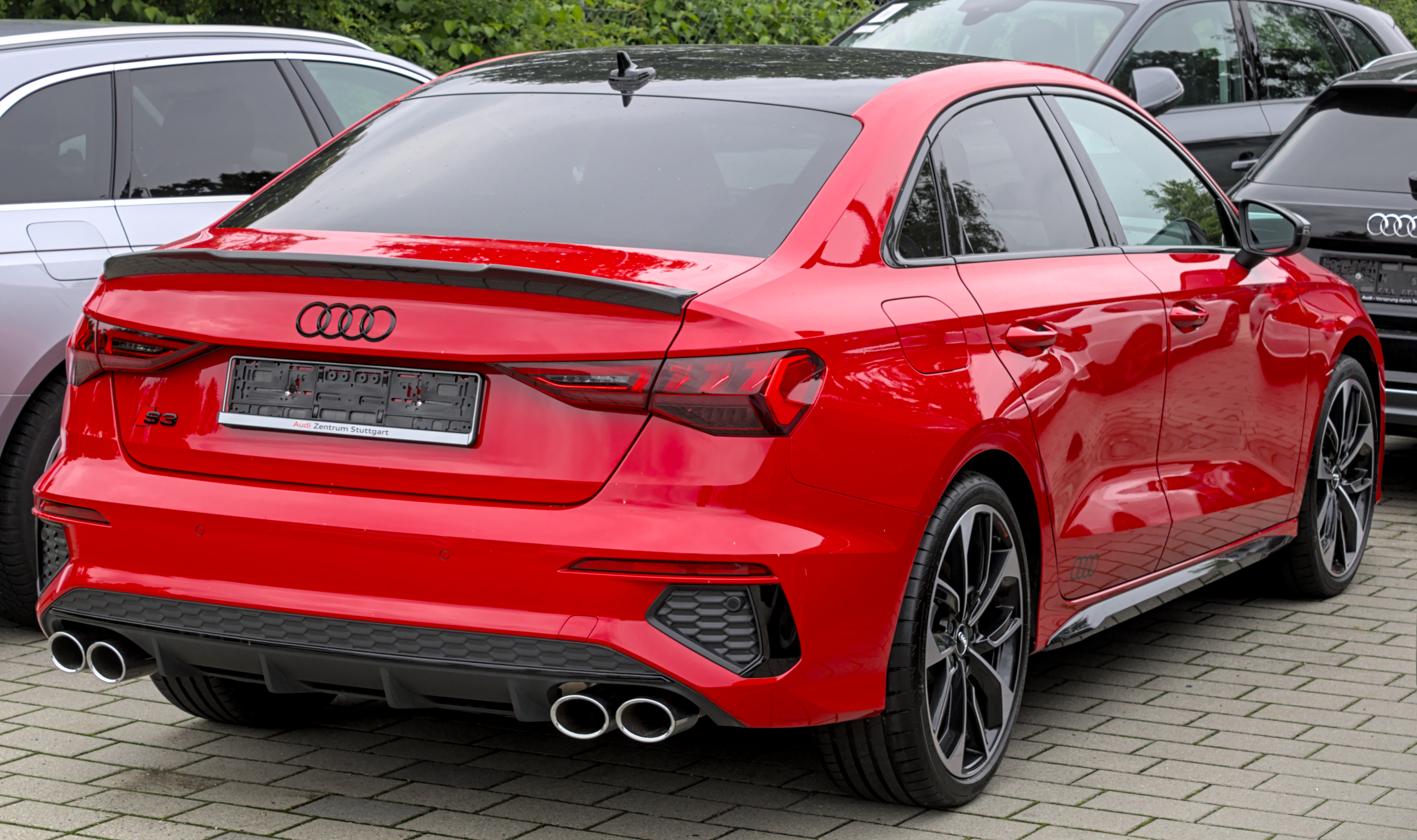
Audi S3 Saloon

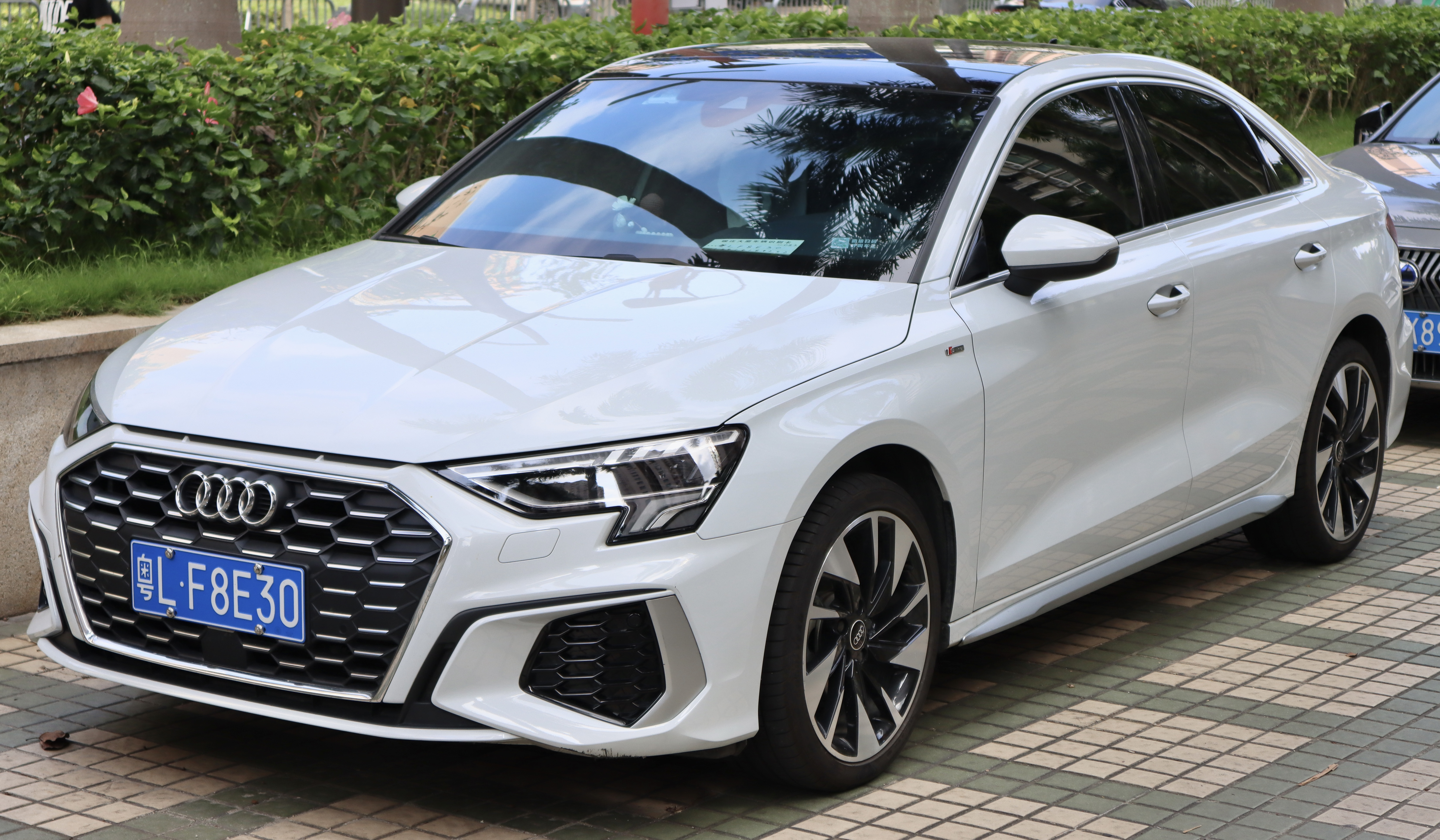
Audi A3L front view (China)

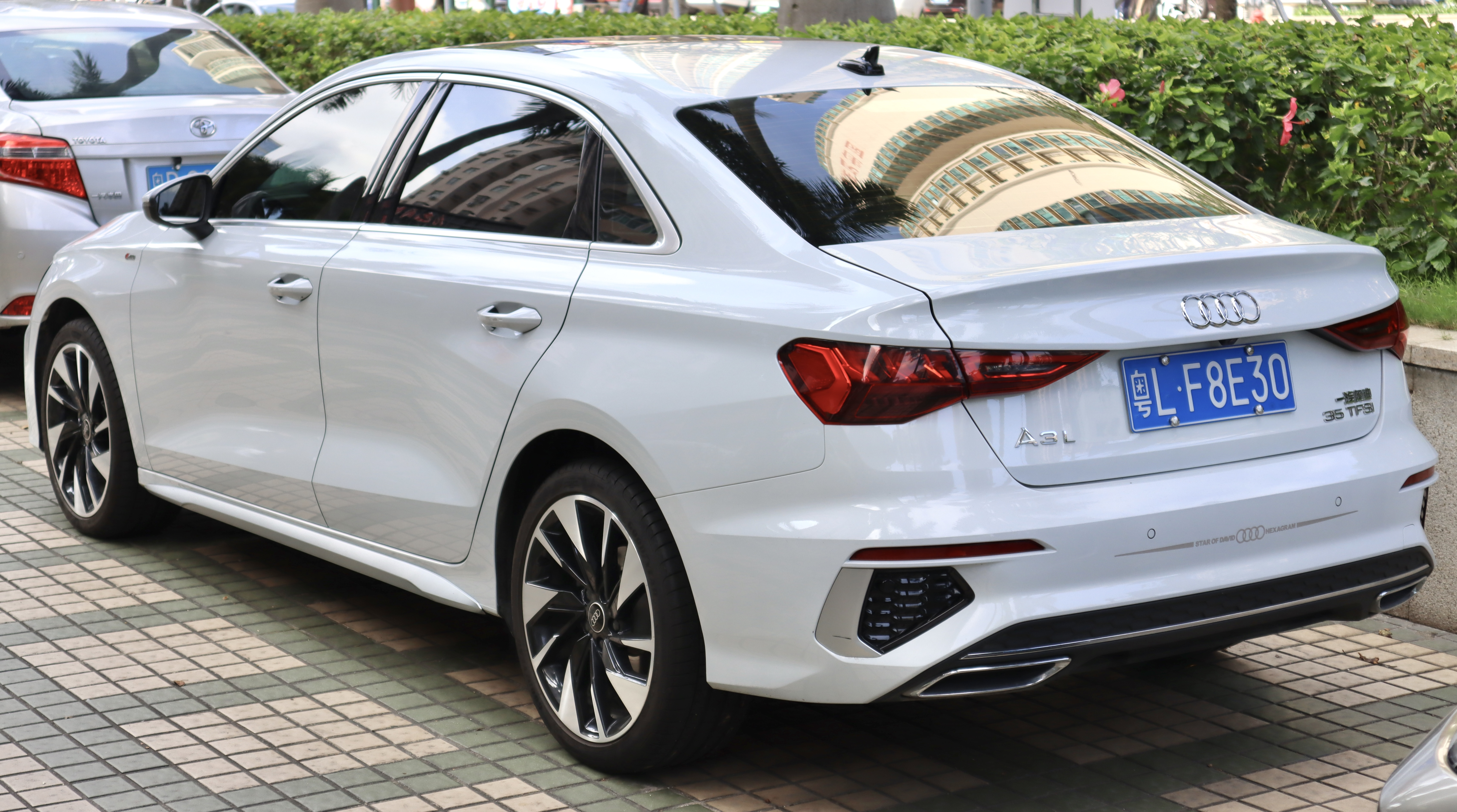
Audi A3L rear view (China)

=== Audi RS 3 ===
The highest specification RS 3 model is fitted with a 2.5-litre 5-cylinder producing 400 PS (294 kW; 395 hp) and 500 N⋅m (369 lb⋅ft), and has a 0-60 mph (97 km/h) acceleration time of 3.8 seconds. It gets a seven-speed dual-clutch automatic S-Tronic gearbox. It also gets the new MMI infotainment system, with a 10.25 or 12.3-inch digital instrument cluster, and a secondary screen of 10.1-inches. With the RS Dynamic package the speed limiter is removed, allowing the RS3 to reach a top speed of 290 km/h (180 mph). The US-market RS3 produces marginally more power than the European RS3, at a claimed 401 hp (299 kW; 407 PS). This is partially due to the lack of a petrol particulate filter for US model cars, as it is not required to meet emissions standards. The US-market RS3 instead receives a secondary catalytic converter.

In October 2022, the RS3 Performance Edition was introduced for European buyers. The boost was increased from 1.5 to 1.6 bar (21.8 to 23.2 psi), bringing power up to 407 PS (299 kW; 401 hp) and thus matching the peak power of the federalised version. Torque remained as before but across a slightly wider range. The (unlimited) top speed reaches 300 km/h (186 mph), a first for an A3 based model. Production is limited to 300 units.

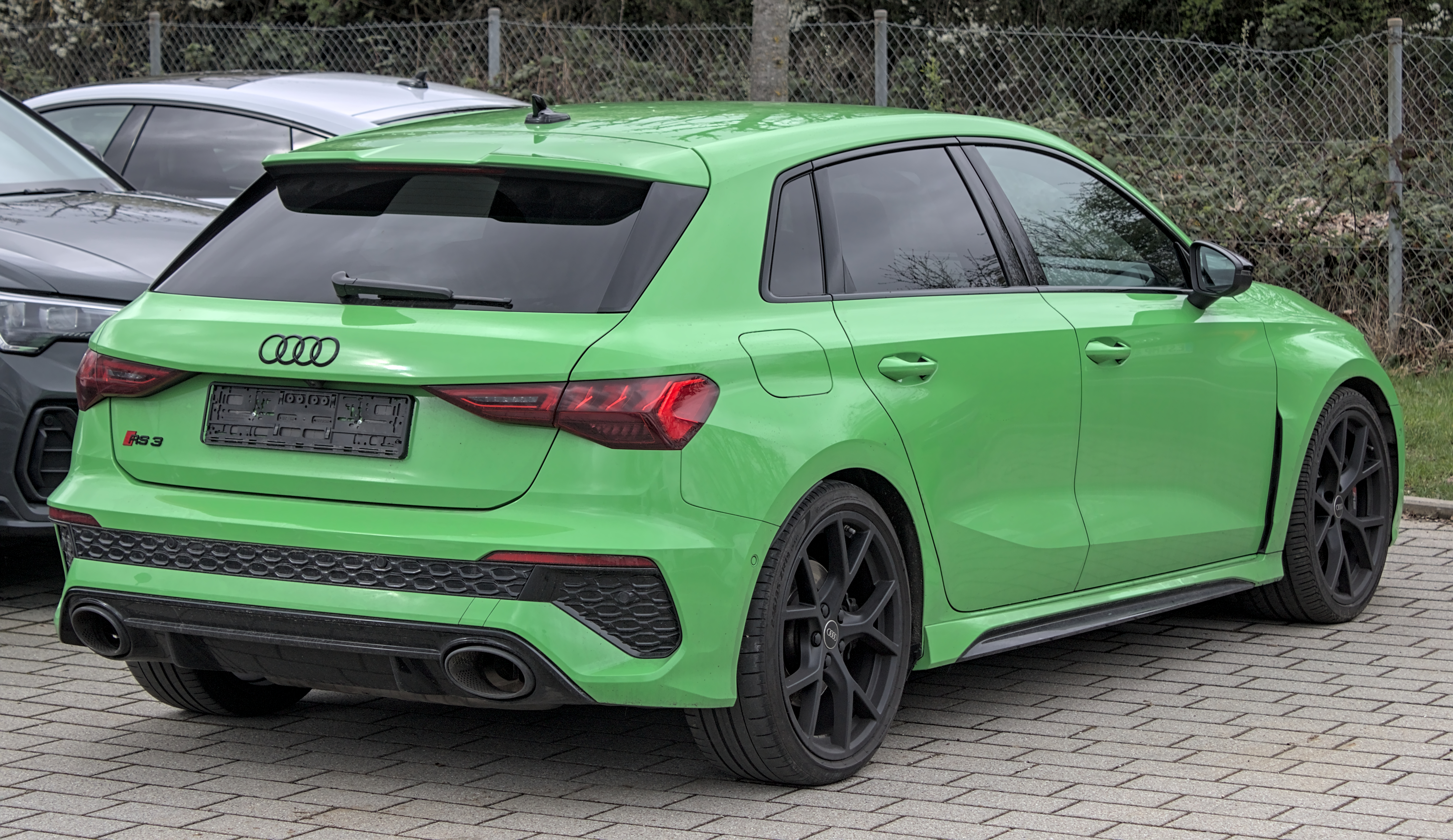
Audi RS3 Sportback

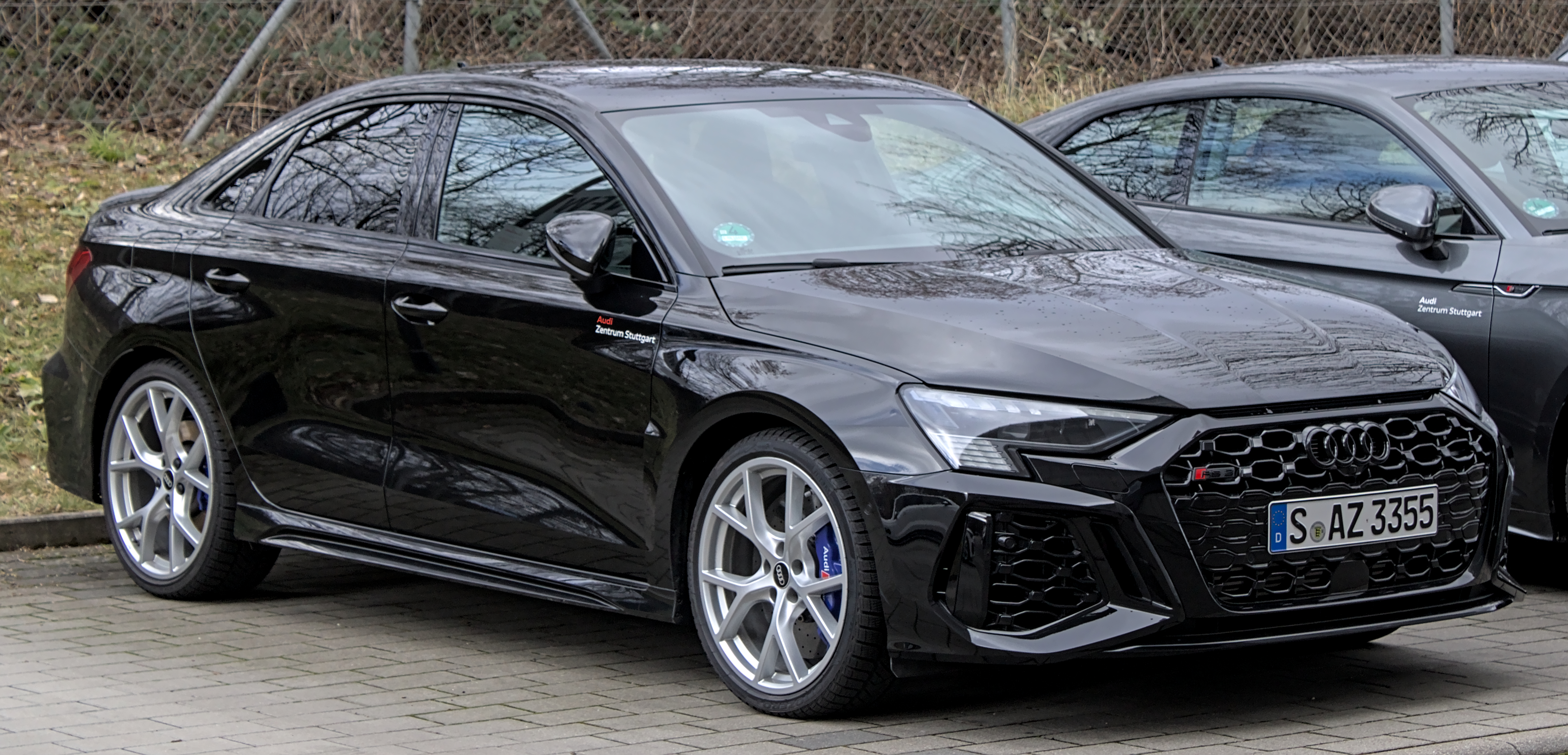
Audi RS3 Saloon

=== 2024 refresh ===
Audi presented a revised version of the A3 and S3 on 12 March 2024, announcing the RS3 after. The mid-cycle refresh saw the introduction of the allstreet variant, featuring a raised body and off-road trim. It featured updated exterior styling elements including revised headlights, a redesigned front grille, modified bumpers, new wheel designs, and an updated rear diffuser. Interior updates include silver trim around the air vents, enhanced ambient lighting, and decorative fabric trim accents throughout the cabin. A significant mechanical change for 2025 is the standardisation of Audi's quattro all-wheel drive system across all A3 variants in North America, eliminating the previously available front-wheel drive configuration.

The base model RS 3 maintains the same 2.5-liter turbocharged inline-five, with the North American saloon version updated to produce 401 hp compared to the previous 396 hp. It remains paired with an updated version of the Quattro S seven-speed dual-clutch automatic. The 0–60 mph time for the facelifted model improves from 3.8 to 3.6 seconds, with a factory-limited top speed of 155 mph. Fuel efficiency is slightly better, with the RS3 Sedan rated at 9.1 L/100 km 25.8 mpg US and 207 g/km of CO₂ emissions.

The European RS 3 Sportback shows slightly more fuel consumption and emissions compared to the saloon, with a rating of 9.3 L/100 km 25.3 mpg US and its CO₂ emissions of 217 g/km, retaining its G-class efficiency classification.

The updated RS3 benefits from a revised chassis aimed at improving handling with updates to the torque splitter, adaptive dampers, and wheel-selective torque control. This allows the car to turn more sharply and reduce understeer. These improvements contributed to the development driver, Frank Stippler, setting a 7:33.123 lap time on the Nürburgring track, beating the previous compact-class record by more than five seconds.

The A3 powertrain consists of a 2.0-liter turbocharged inline-four engine producing 201 horsepower, paired with a 48-volt mild hybrid system. For the 2025 model year, torque output increased to 236 lb-ft from the previous 221 lb-ft. Power is delivered through a seven-speed S tronic dual-clutch automatic transmission. The mild hybrid system enables improved fuel efficiency through extended stop-start functionality and regenerative capabilities.

The A3 features a 10.3-inch digital instrument cluster as standard, with an optional upgrade to a 12.3-inch display through the Technology package. A 10.1-inch touchscreen infotainment system comes standard with wireless Apple CarPlay and Android Auto integration. Two trim levels are offered in the United States: the Premium starting at $38,200 and the Premium Plus at $40,800. The A3 earned a spot on Car and Driver's Editors' Choice list for 2025.

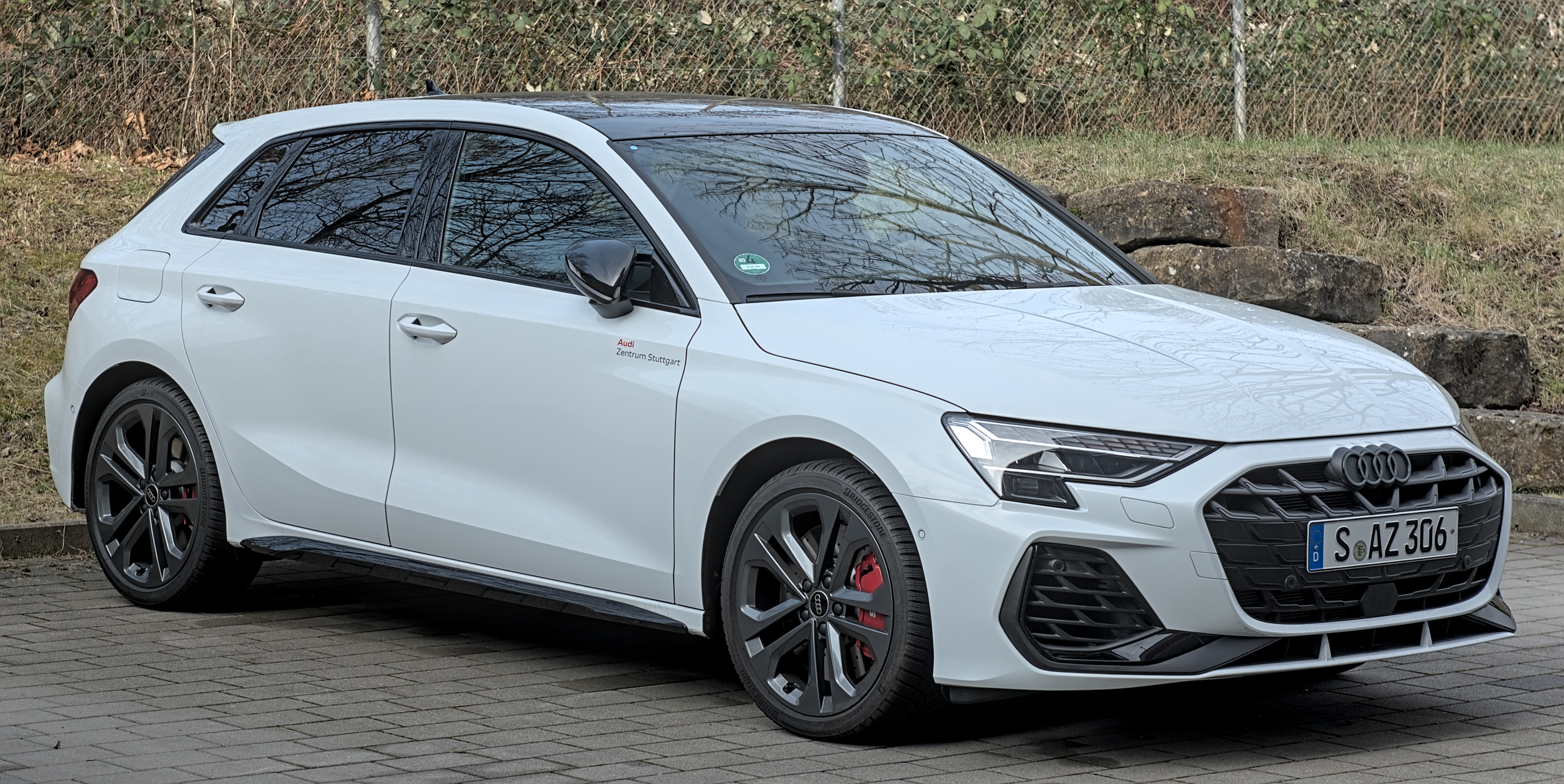
Audi A3 Sportback S-Line (facelift)

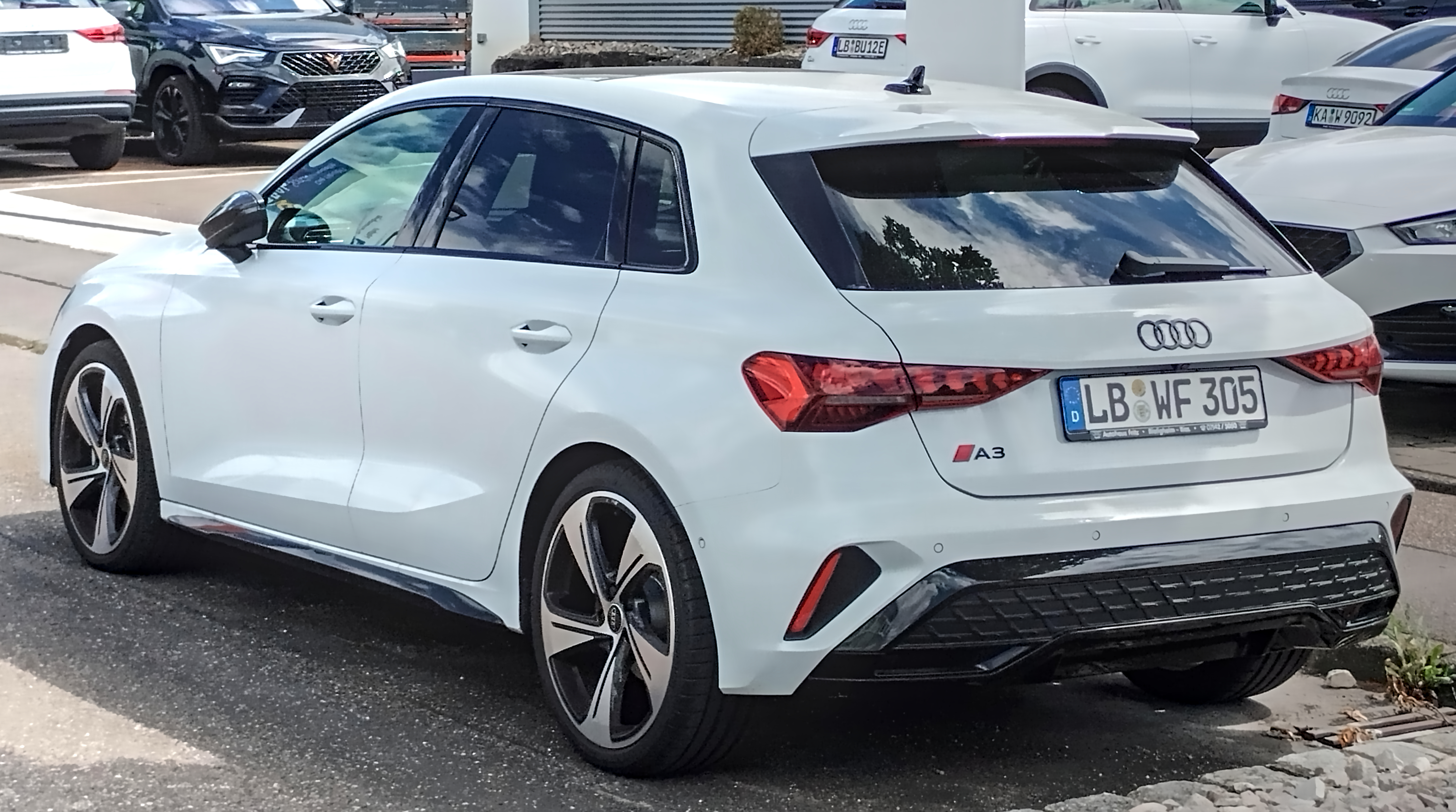
Audi A3 Sportback S-Line (facelift)

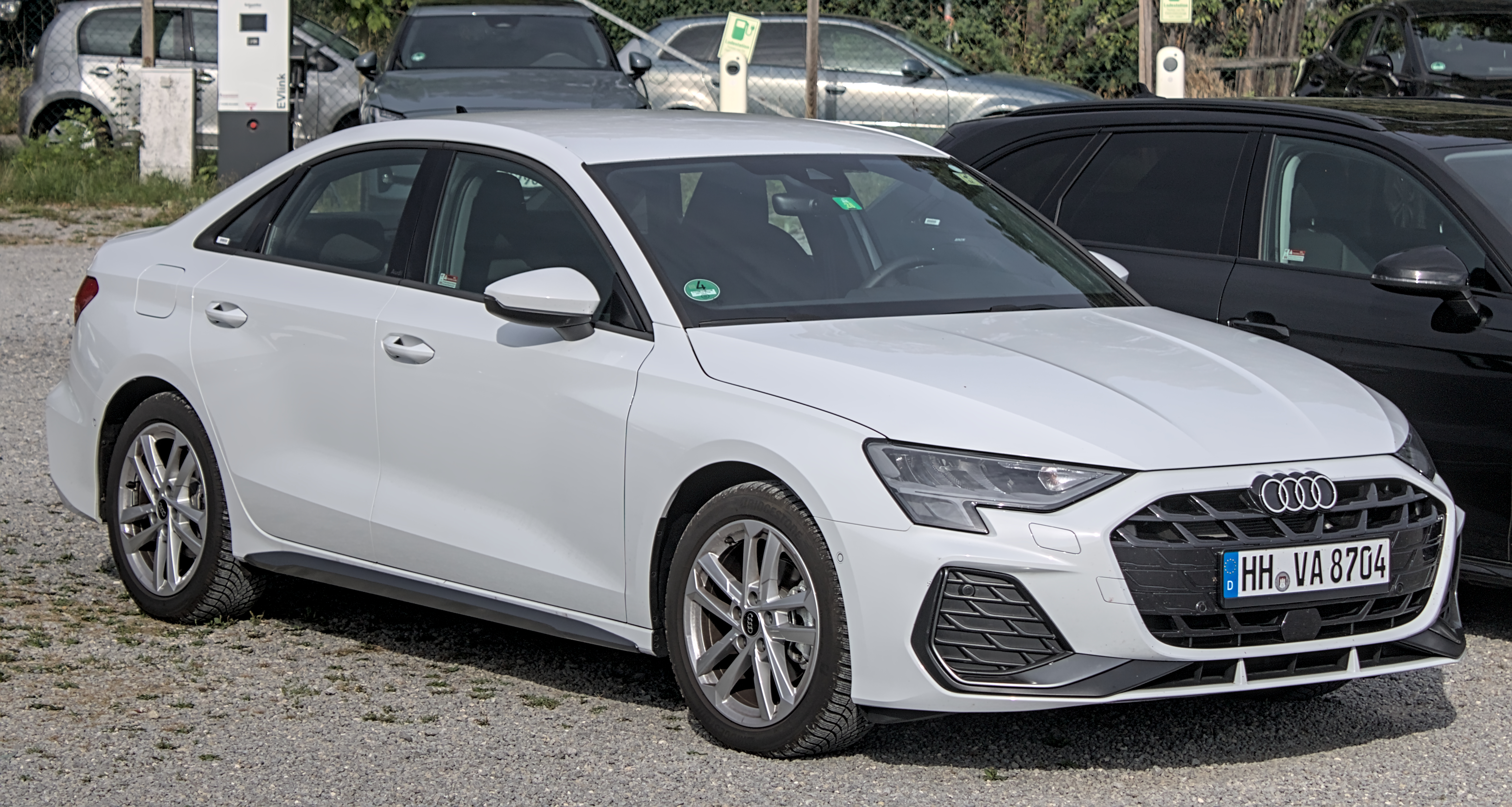
Audi A3 Saloon S-Line (facelift)

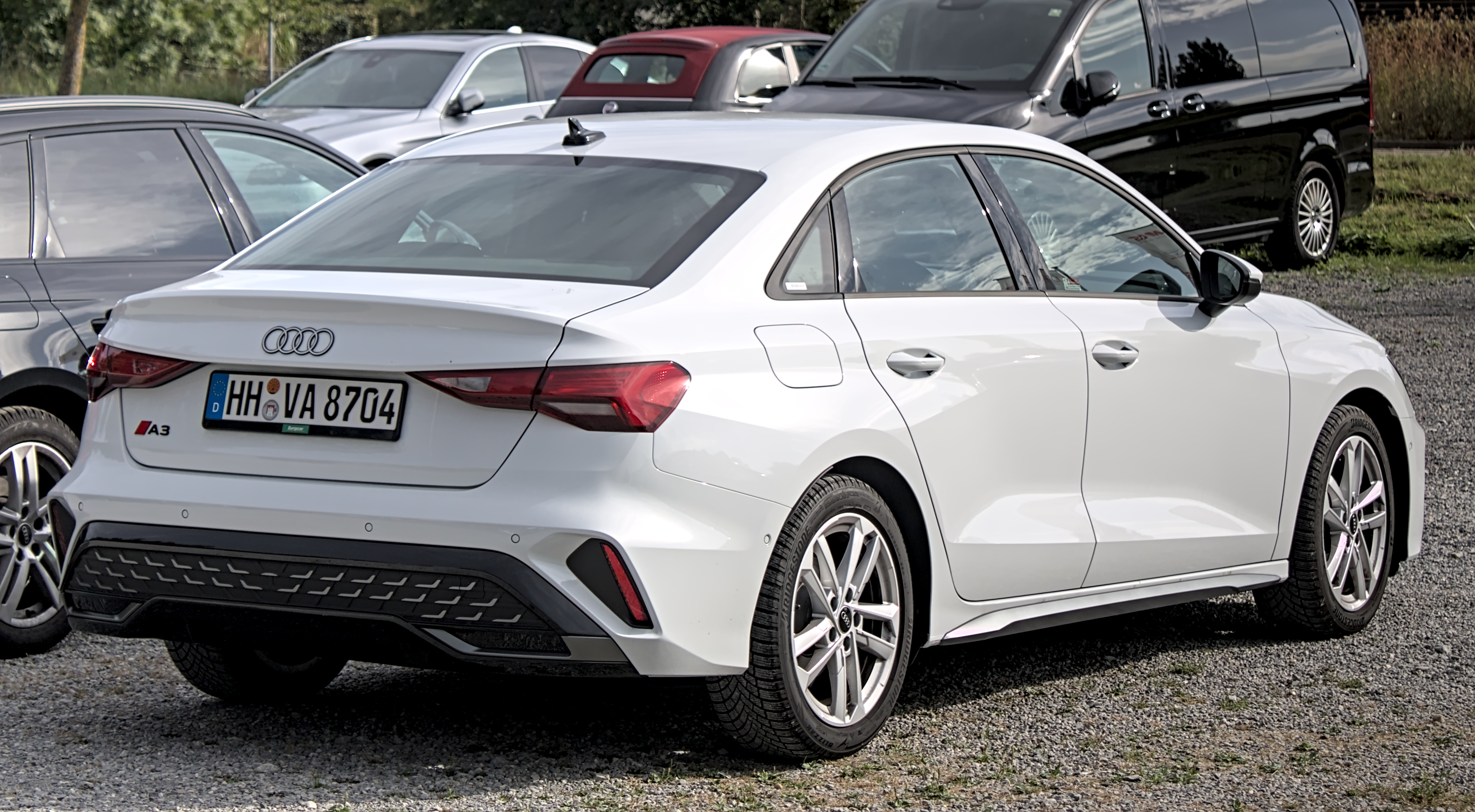
Audi A3 Saloon S-Line (facelift)

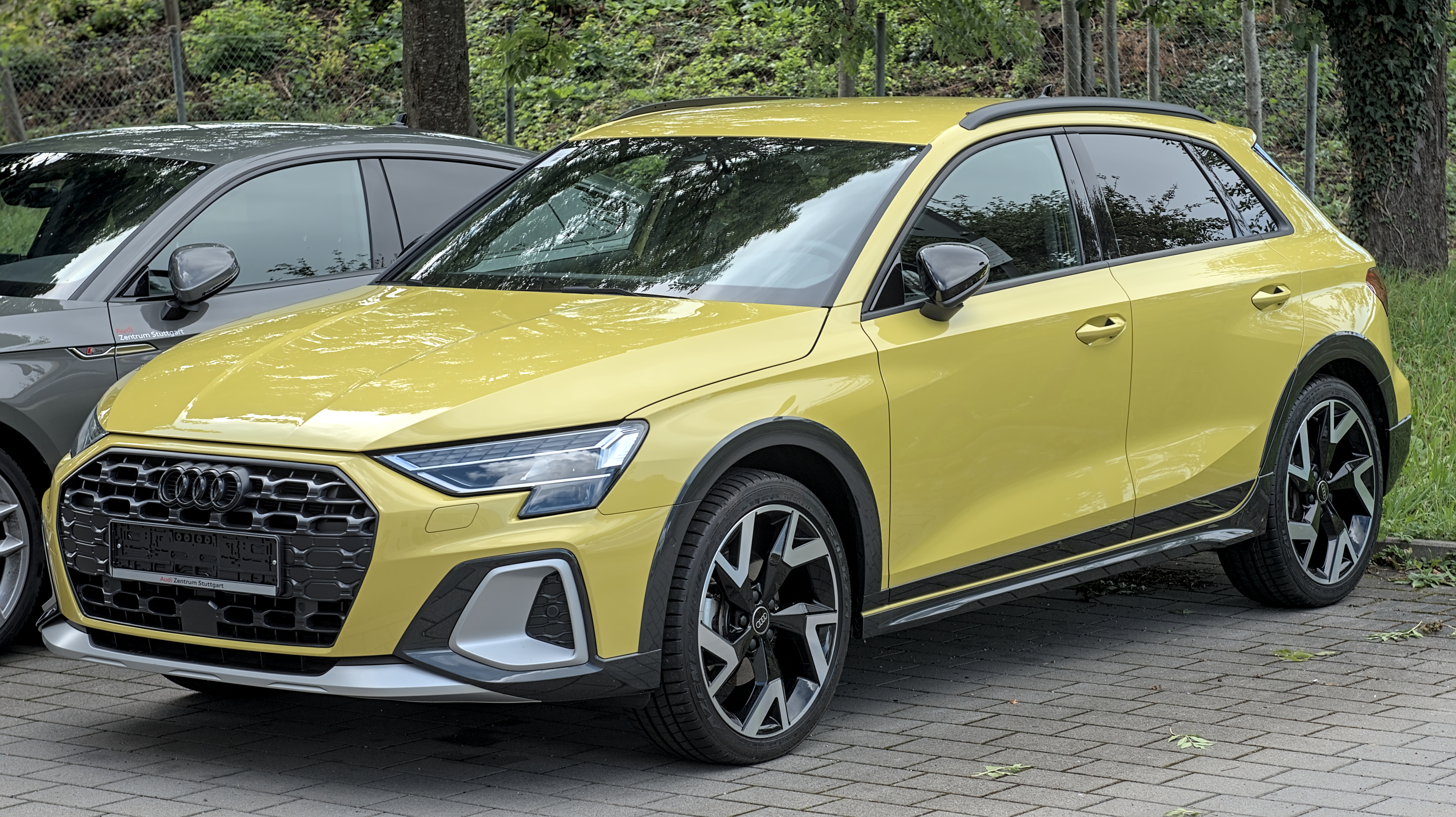
Audi A3 allstreet

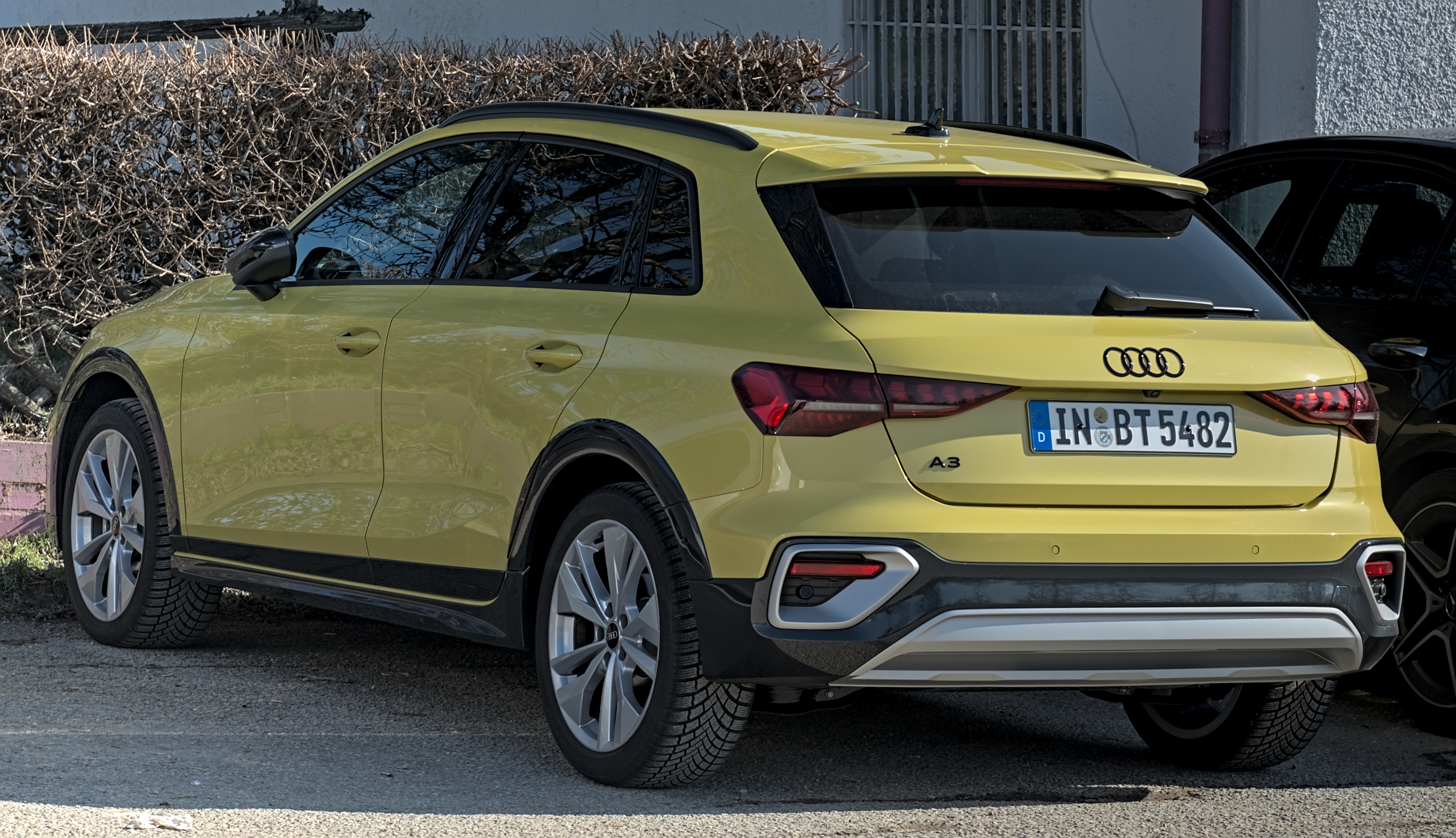
Audi A3 allstreet

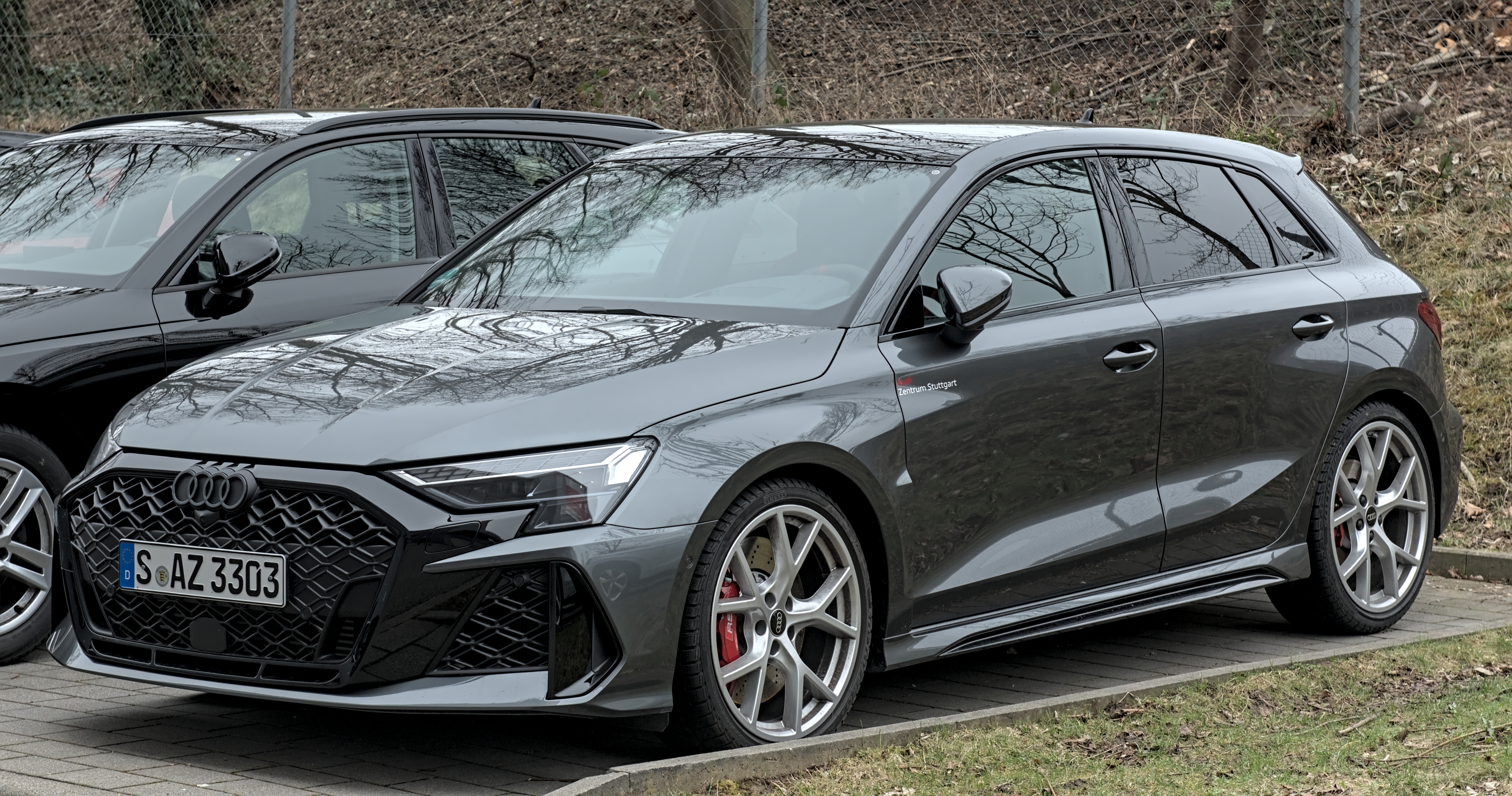
Audi RS3 Sportback (facelift)

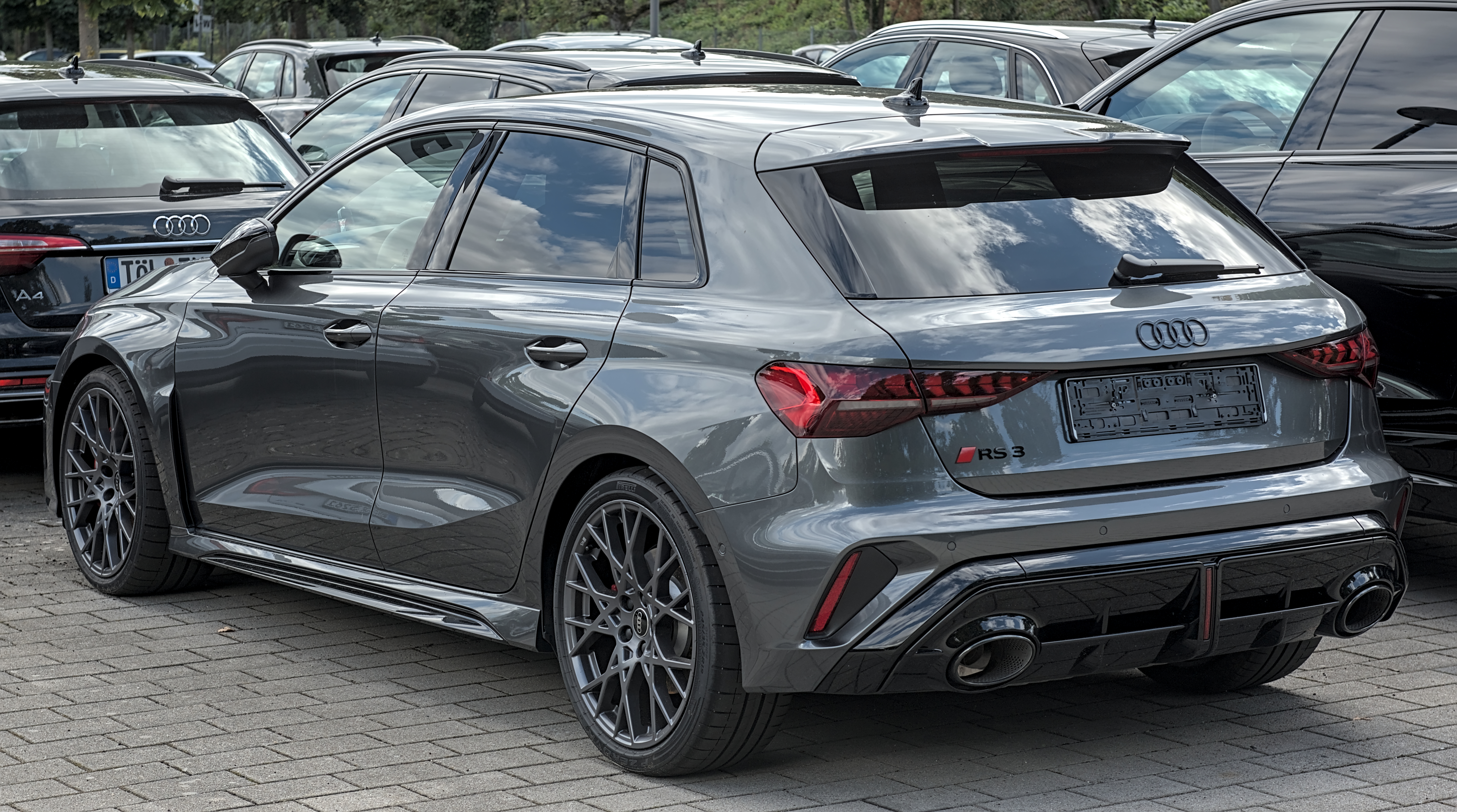
Audi RS3 Sportback (facelift)

=== 2026 refresh ===
In June 2026, Audi announced a further update for the A3 range, adding a new cockpit with an 11.9-inch digital instrument cluster and a 12.8-inch MMI display housed in a curved unit from the Q3, as well as expanded driver-assistance and parking functions.

=== Safety ===
Euro NCAP test results Audi A3 35 TFSI (LHD) (2020)
Test	Points	%
Overall:	5 /5 stars	
Adult occupant:	34.1	89%
Child occupant:	39.7	81%
Pedestrian:	36.8	68%
Safety assist:	11.8	73%

Euro NCAP test results Audi A3 35 TFSI (LHD) (2025)
Test	Points	%
Overall:	5 /5 stars	
Adult occupant:	34.4	86%
Child occupant:	39.7	81%
Pedestrian:	48.3	76%
Safety assist:	13.4	74%

ANCAP test results Audi A3 (2025, aligned with Euro NCAP)
Test	Points	%
Overall:	5 /5 stars	
Adult occupant:	34.44	86%
Child occupant:	39.34	80%
Pedestrian:	48.29	76%
Safety assist:	13.61	75%

== Sales ==
Year	Global (production)	Europe	United States	Canada	China	A3 Cabriolet (production)
1996	51,813					-
1997	128,183	118,667	-			-
1998	143,974	127,435	-			-
1999	143,505	134,188	-			-
2000	136,141	125,594	-			-
2001	144,756	123,561	-			-
2002	125,538	107,229	-			-
2003	159,417	131,097	-			-
2004	181,274	164,993	-			-
2005	224,961	193,570	5,389			-
2006	231,752	202,511	8,040			-
2007	230,901	20,015	6,354			216
2008	203,594	190,114	4,759			18,570
2009	196,965	188,994	3,874			9,782
2010	186,665	178,650	6,558			12,309
2011	189,068	148,428	6,561			
2012	164,666	131,269	7,205	1,409		
2013	221,097	167,804	857	354		
2014	351,526	199,815	22,250	2,452	32,034	
2015	370,144	198,663	35,984	3,788	64,353	
2016	361,983	189,956	31,538	3,795	84,784	
2017	313,380	163,928	23,610	3,997	82,735	
2018	304,903	142,414	18,305	4,249	92,192	
2019	240,795	124,422	10,418	3,117	84,600	
2020	206,482	97,492	9,937	1,720	76,912	
2021	164,299	95,788	2,390	425	60,281	
2022	210,341	105,709	11,349		70,790	
2023	246,279		13,626		62,770	
2024			9,528		54,968	
2025			8,315		63,749	

== Awards and accolades ==
- (2014) World Car of the Year
- (2013) What Car? Small Family Car of the Year
- (2013) What Car? Car of the Year
- (2006) South African Car of the Year
- (2000) Brazilian Car of the Year
- (1997, 1999, 2000) Auto motor und sport readers' poll Best Car award
- (1997) Autozeitung "Auto Trophy" award
- (1996) Bild am Sonntag "Golden Steering Wheel" award

== Motorsport ==
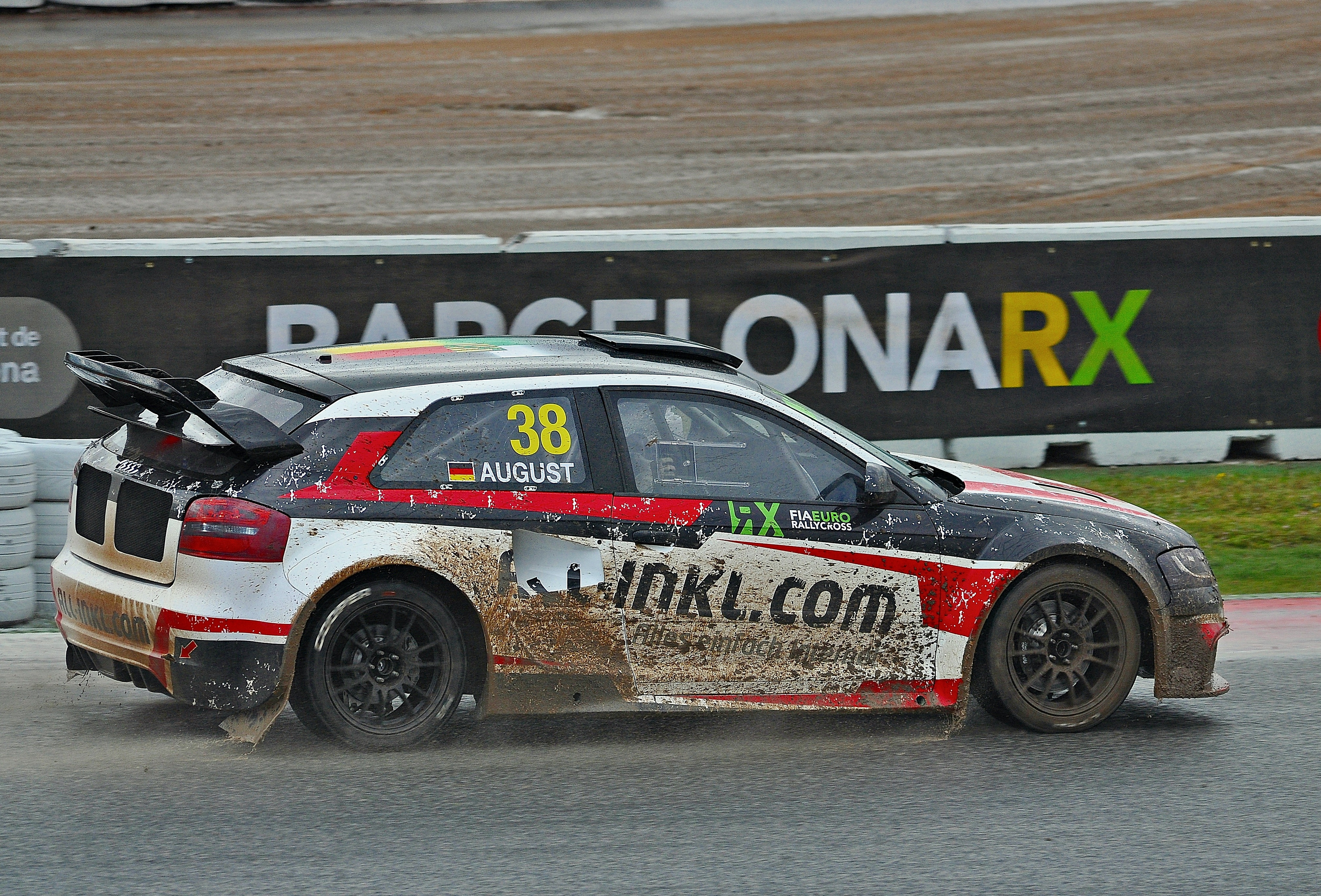
An Audi S3 driven by Mandie August in the FIA European Rallycross Championship

S3 and RS 3 models have competed in various TCR Touring Car and rallycross series.
