= Volkswagen Passat (B9) =

Ninth generation of Volkswagen Passat

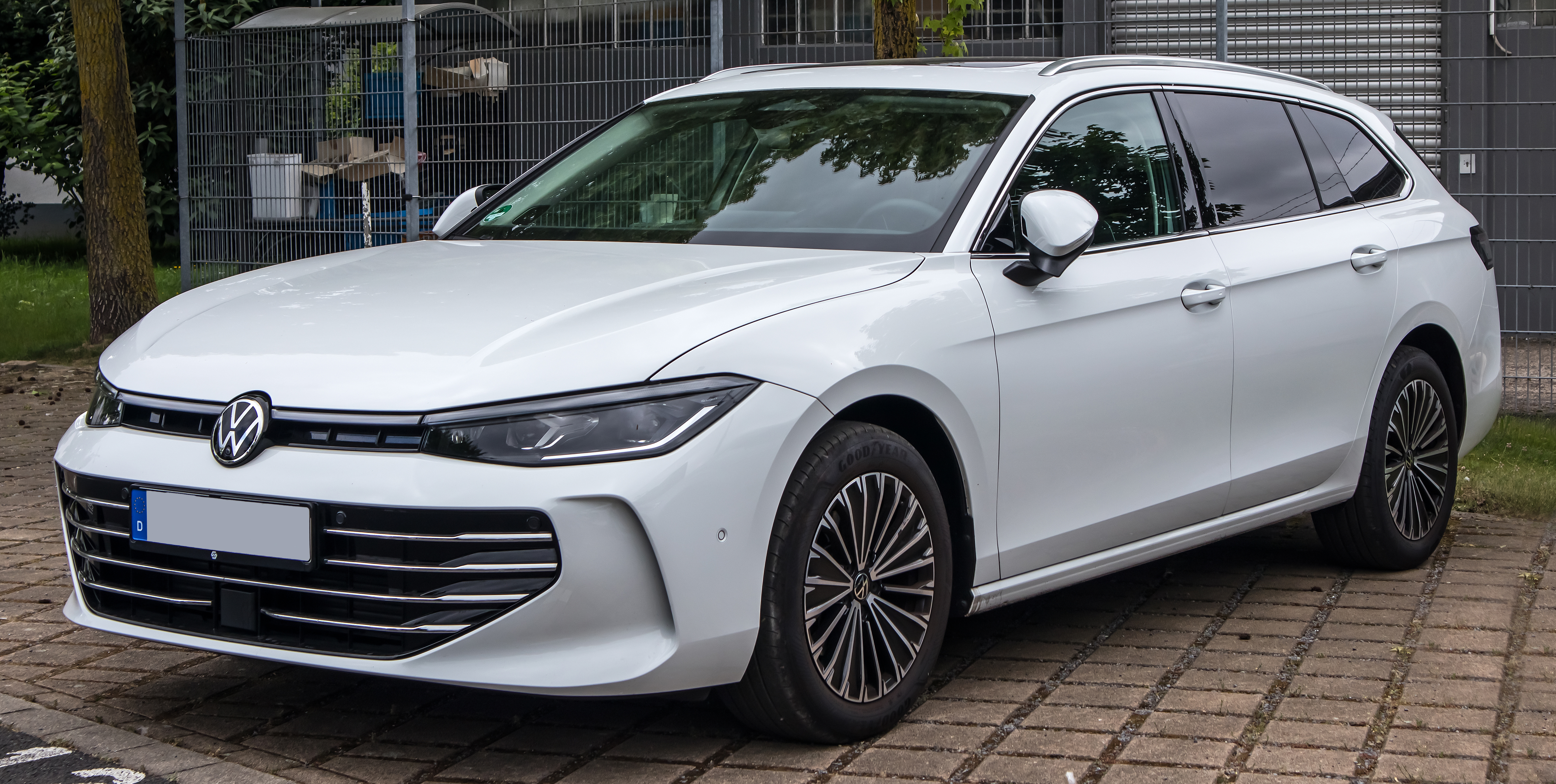
- Volkswagen Passat Variant Elegance

Overview
- Manufacturer: Volkswagen
- Model code: CJ5
- Production: December 2023 – present
- Assembly: Slovakia: Bratislava

Body and chassis
- Class: Large family car (D)
- Body style: 5-door estate
- Layout: Front-engine, front-wheel-drive Front-engine, all-wheel-drive
- Platform: Volkswagen Group MQB Evo
- Related: Škoda Superb Mk4; Volkswagen Magotan (B9); Volkswagen Passat Pro

Powertrain
- Engine: Petrol: 1.5 L TSI I4 mild hybrid; 2.0 L TSI I4; Petrol plug-in hybrid: 1.5 L TSI I4 (eHybrid); Diesel: 2.0 L TDI I4
- Transmission: 6-speed DSG (eHybrid); 7-speed DSG
- Hybrid drivetrain: PHEV
- Battery: 25.7 kWh Li-NMC (eHybrid)
- Electric range: 126–131 km (78–81 mi) (eHybrid)

Dimensions
- Wheelbase: 2,841 mm (111.9 in)
- Length: 4,917 mm (193.6 in)
- Width: 1,852 mm (72.9 in)
- Height: 1,506 mm (59.3 in)
- Kerb weight: 1,572–1,855 kg (3,466–4,090 lb)

Chronology
- Predecessor: Volkswagen Passat (B8)

The Volkswagen Passat (B9) is a large family car (D-segment) (Note: Roughly equivalent to a North American mid-size car) manufactured by Volkswagen since 2023, replacing the Passat B8 model, and the B9 is the ninth-generation model in the Passat series. It is a 5-door estate (Note: Also known as a station wagon) which is mainly sold in the European market as the Passat Estate or Passat Variant. The model also has two 4-door saloon (Note: Also known as a sedan) derivatives, which are sold only in China as the Volkswagen Magotan and Volkswagen Passat Pro.

== Overview ==
The Volkswagen Passat B9 was unveiled on 31 August 2023 and made its official debut at the 2023 Munich Motor Show, it is based on the revised version of the MQB Evo platform and is assembled in Slovakia instead of Germany alongside the Škoda Superb that it is based on. It shares the same body panels and greenhouse with the Superb.

Compared to its predecessor, the exterior design is more streamlined with a drag coefficient of 0.25 Cd, becoming the most aerodynamic estate car Volkswagen has ever produced. The front has LED headlights available with the option of IQ.Matrix LED lighting system, a horizontal LED light strip in the grille merged with the LED daytime running lights inside the headlights, and the bonnet is made lower in the centre. Similar to the front, the rear has a "clean and powerful design" with a full-width light bar and Passat is spelled in letters across the tailgate.

The interior of the Passat is quite similar to Volkswagen ID. series models. It features a 10.25-inch digital instrument cluster, a standard 12.9-inch touchscreen infotainment system using the MIB4 system (it can also be upgraded to a larger 15-inch screen), backlit sliders below touchscreen are used to control the volume and temperature, the steering wheel uses physical buttons, and the gear lever is relocated on the steering wheel column for additional storage space in the centre console. Other available features includes a 30-colour ambient lighting, a 700W Harman Kardon sound system, Area View camera system, heads-up display, Park Assist Plus, and Park Assist Pro.

The Passat has a boot space of 690 L (24 cu ft), which can expand to 1,920 L (68 cu ft) when the rear seats are folded. The boot space in the eHybrid model decreases to 530 L (19 cu ft) because of the batteries for the hybrid system placed under the boot floor.

Being based on the updated MQB Evo platform, it retains the MacPherson struts for the front and multi-link rear suspension setups from its predecessor. It has been reworked with new two-valve dampers, new Vehicle Dynamics Manager (VDM) system and available with the optional Dynamic Chassis Control Pro adaptive suspension dampers.

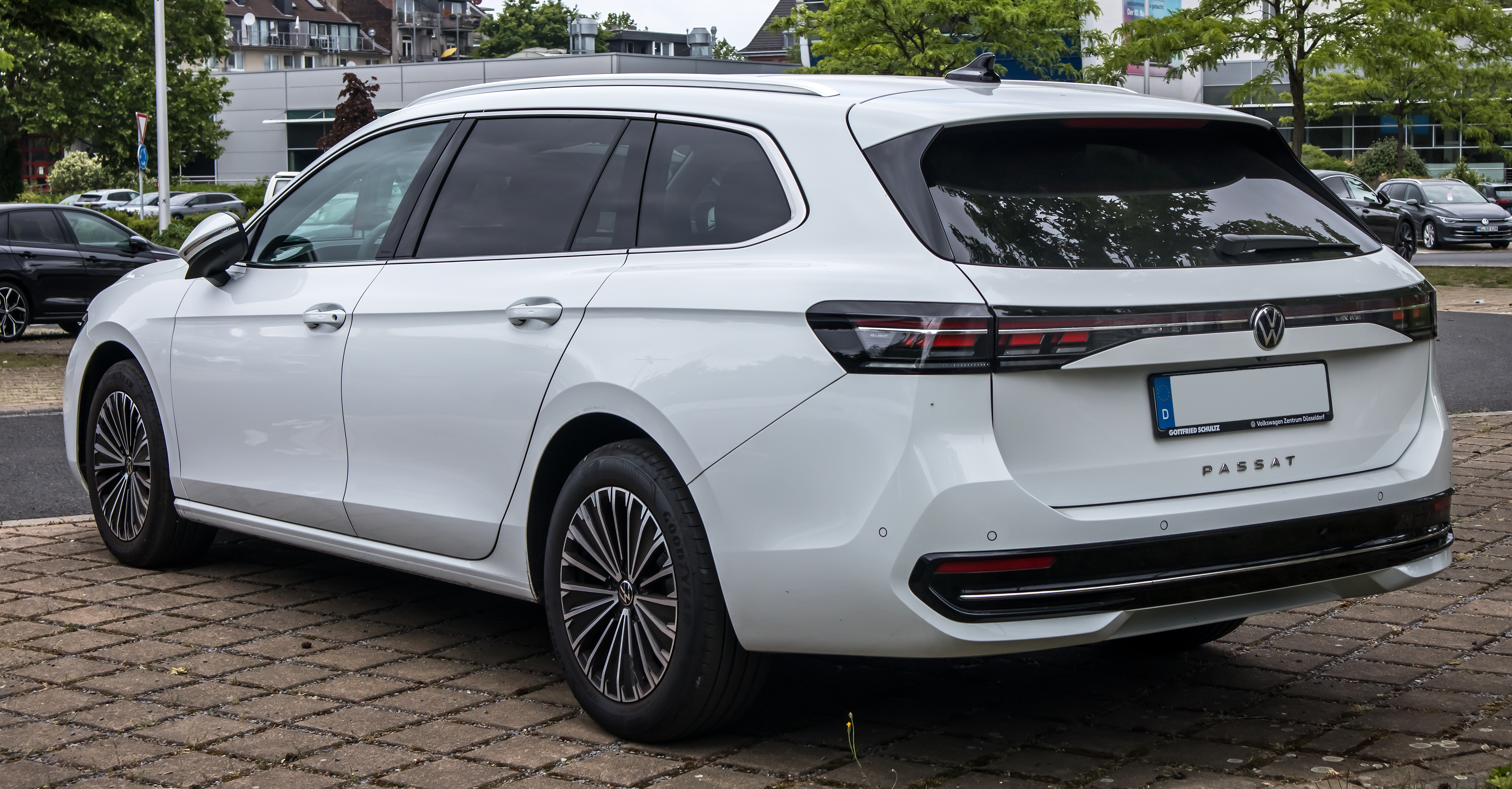
Rear view

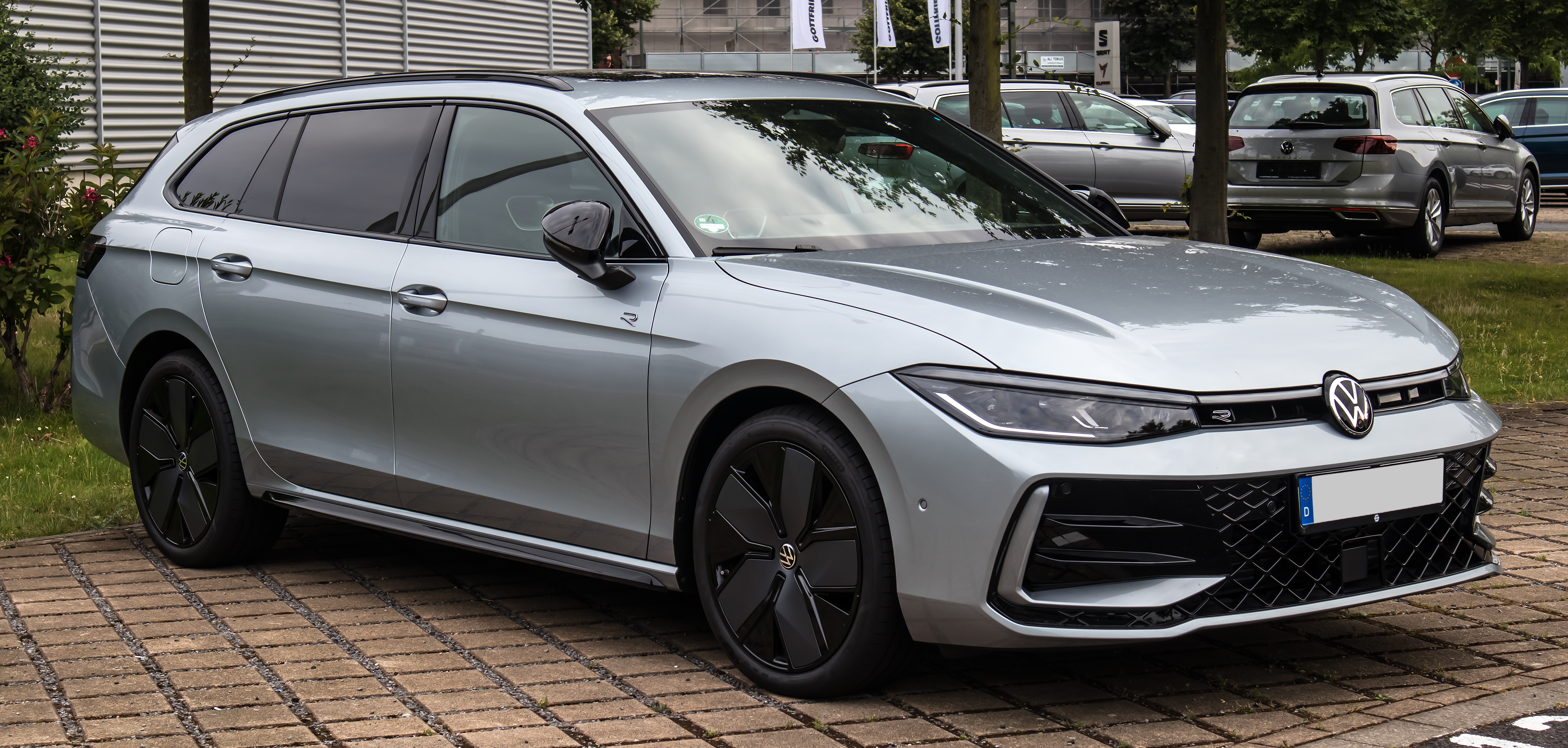
Volkswagen Passat R-Line

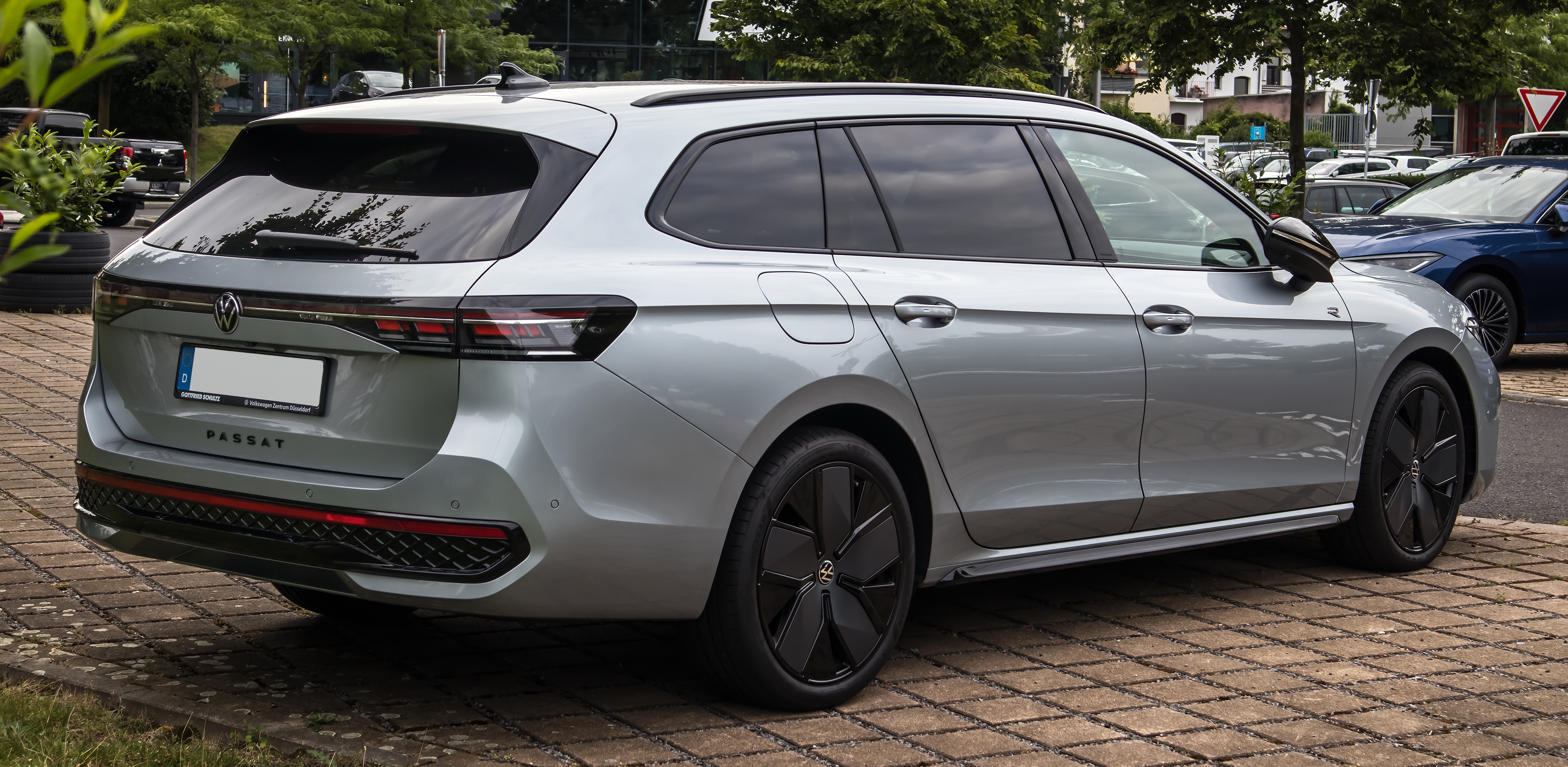
Rear view (R-Line)

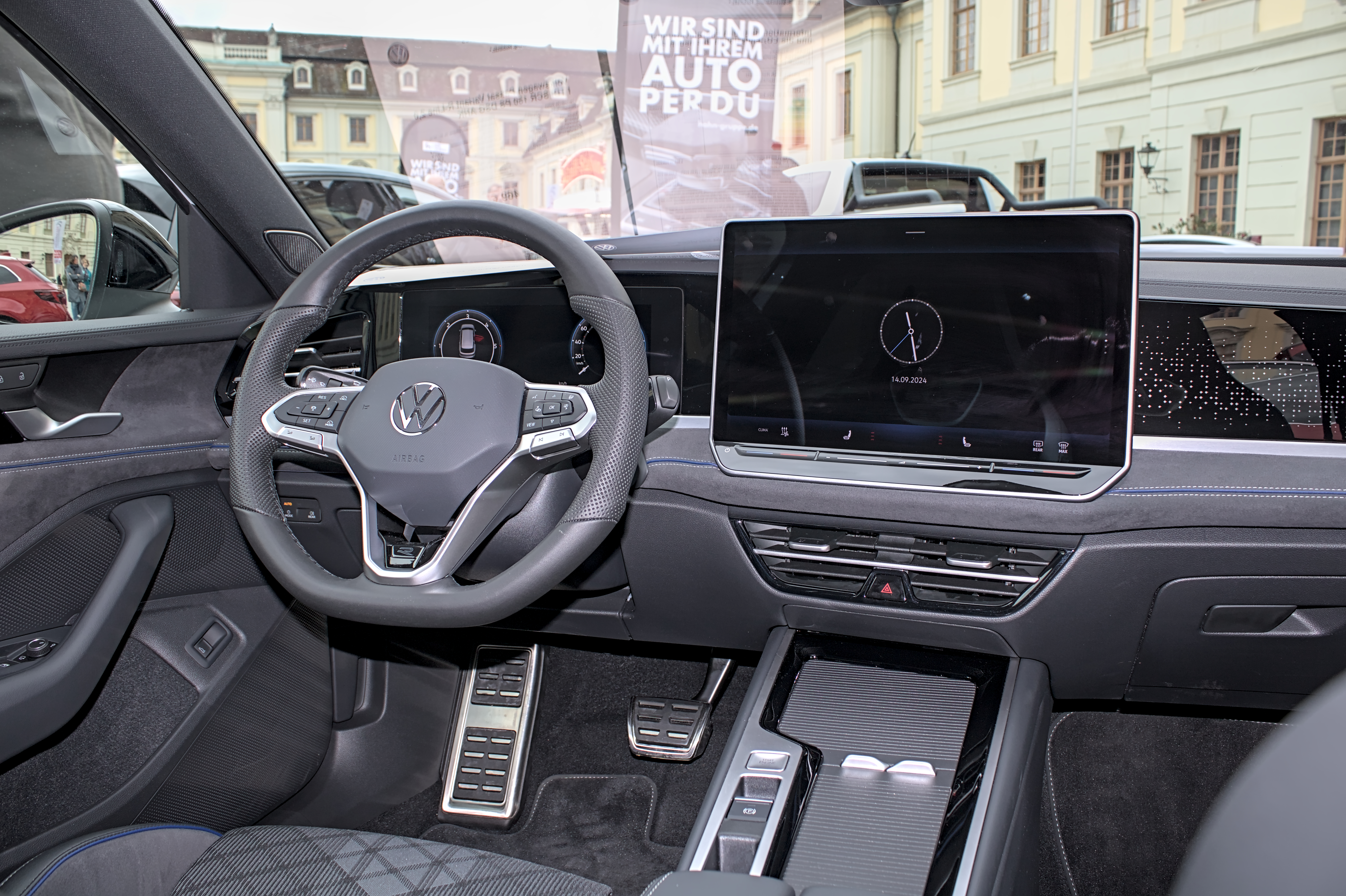
Interior

== Engines ==
The Passat is available with petrol (TSI), diesel (TDI), petrol mild hybrid (eTSI) and petrol plug-in hybrid (eHybrid) powertrains. The eTSI features Active Cylinder Management (ACTplus) and for the first time the eHybrid is compatible with DC charging at a 50 kW speed. All engines use a dual-clutch automatic transmission; unlike its predecessor, a manual option will not be available.

Petrol engines
Model	Engine	Power	Torque	Top speed	0–100 km/h (0–62 mph)
1.5 eTSI	1.5 L (1,498 cc)	150 PS (110 kW; 148 hp)	250 N⋅m (184 lb⋅ft)	222 km/h (138 mph)	9.2 s
2.0 TSI 4MOTION	2.0 L (1,984 cc)	265 PS (195 kW; 261 hp)	400 N⋅m (295 lb⋅ft)	250 km/h (155 mph)	5.8 s
Diesel engines
2.0 TDI	2.0 L (1,968 cc)	122 PS (90 kW; 120 hp)	320 N⋅m (236 lb⋅ft)	212 km/h (132 mph)	11 s
2.0 TDI	2.0 L (1,968 cc)	150 PS (110 kW; 148 hp)	360 N⋅m (266 lb⋅ft)	223 km/h (139 mph)	9.3 s
2.0 TDI 4MOTION	2.0 L (1,968 cc)	193 PS (142 kW; 190 hp)	400 N⋅m (295 lb⋅ft)	232 km/h (144 mph)	7.6 s
PHEV engines
1.5 TSI eHybrid	1.5 L (1,498 cc)	150 PS (110 kW; 148 hp) (engine); 115 PS (85 kW; 113 hp) (electric motor) 204 PS (150 kW; 201 hp) (combined)	250 N⋅m (184 lb⋅ft) (engine); 330 N⋅m (243 lb⋅ft) (electric motor) 350 N⋅m (258 lb⋅ft) (combined)	220 km/h (137 mph)	8 s
1.5 TSI eHybrid	1.5 L (1,498 cc)	177 PS (130 kW; 175 hp) (engine); 115 PS (85 kW; 113 hp) (electric motor) 272 PS (200 kW; 268 hp) (combined)	250 N⋅m (184 lb⋅ft) (engine); 330 N⋅m (243 lb⋅ft) (electric motor) 400 N⋅m (295 lb⋅ft) (combined)	225 km/h (140 mph)	7.4 s

== Safety ==
Euro NCAP test results VW Passat 2.0 TDI Business (LHD) (2024)
Test	Points	%
Overall:	5 /5 stars	
Adult occupant:	37.3	93%
Child occupant:	43	87%
Pedestrian:	51.8	82%
Safety assist:	14.4	80%

== Volkswagen Magotan (China) ==
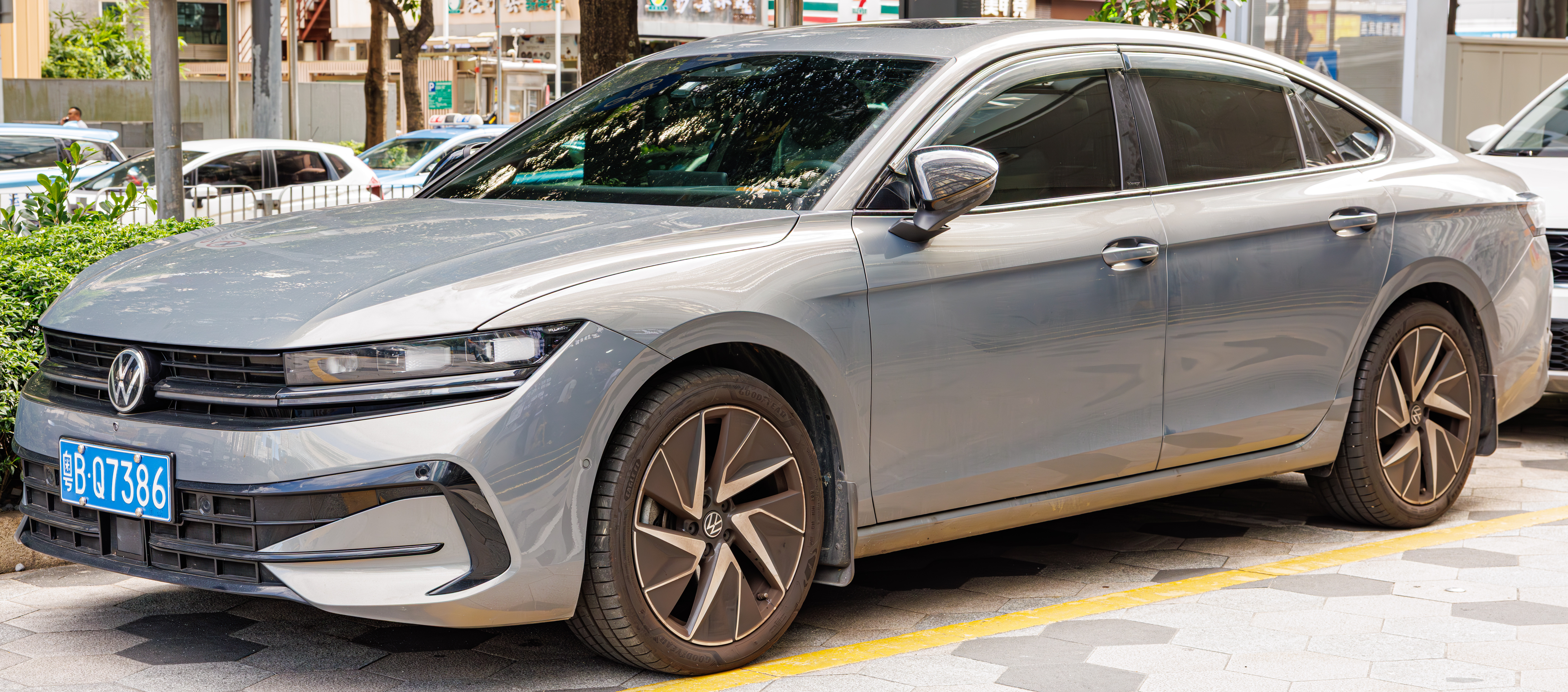
Volkswagen Magotan

The Volkswagen Magotan saloon was unveiled on 25 April 2024 at the 2024 Beijing Auto Show, being based on the same platform as the B9 Passat estate sold globally.

== Volkswagen Passat Pro (China) ==
Volkswagen Passat Pro (B9)
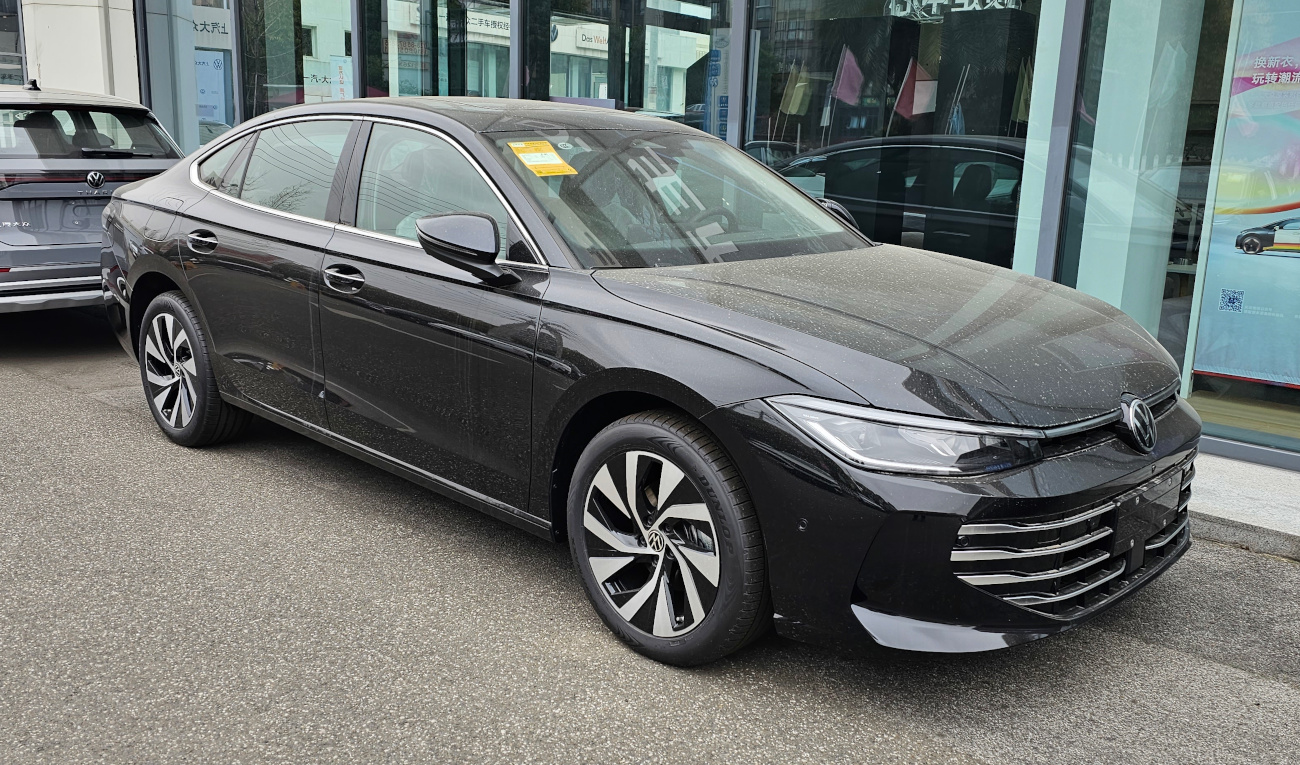

Overview
- Manufacturer: Volkswagen
- Production: 2024–present
- Assembly: China: Nanjing (SAIC-VW)

Body and chassis
- Class: Mid-size car (D)
- Body style: 4-door saloon
- Layout: Front-engine, front-wheel-drive
- Platform: Volkswagen Group MQB Evo
- Related: Volkswagen Passat Variant (B9); Volkswagen Magotan (B9); Škoda Superb Mk4

Powertrain
- Engine: Petrol: 1.4 L EA211-DLE TSI I4; 1.5 L EA211-DSV TSI I4; 2.0 L EA888-DTH TSI I4; 2.0 L EA888-DTJ TSI I4; Petrol plug-in hybrid: 1.5 L EA211 TSI I4
- Transmission: 7-speed DSG; TQ251 (ePro)
- Battery: 22 kWh NMC Sunwoda
- Electric range: 125 km (78 mi)

Dimensions
- Wheelbase: 2,871 mm (113.0 in)
- Length: 5,006 mm (197.1 in); 5,017 mm (197.5 in) (ePro)
- Width: 1,850 mm (72.8 in)
- Height: 1,489 mm (58.6 in)
- Kerb weight: 1,500–1,680 kg (3,307–3,704 lb)

Chronology
- Predecessor: Volkswagen Passat (China, 2019)

The Volkswagen Passat Pro saloon for the Chinese market was released in September 2024. It is based on the same platform as the B9 Magotan, and produced by the SAIC Volkswagen joint venture. Compared to the Magotan, the Passat Pro features a different front fascia that is borrowed from the Passat Estate and is 16 mm (1.6 cm) shorter in length.

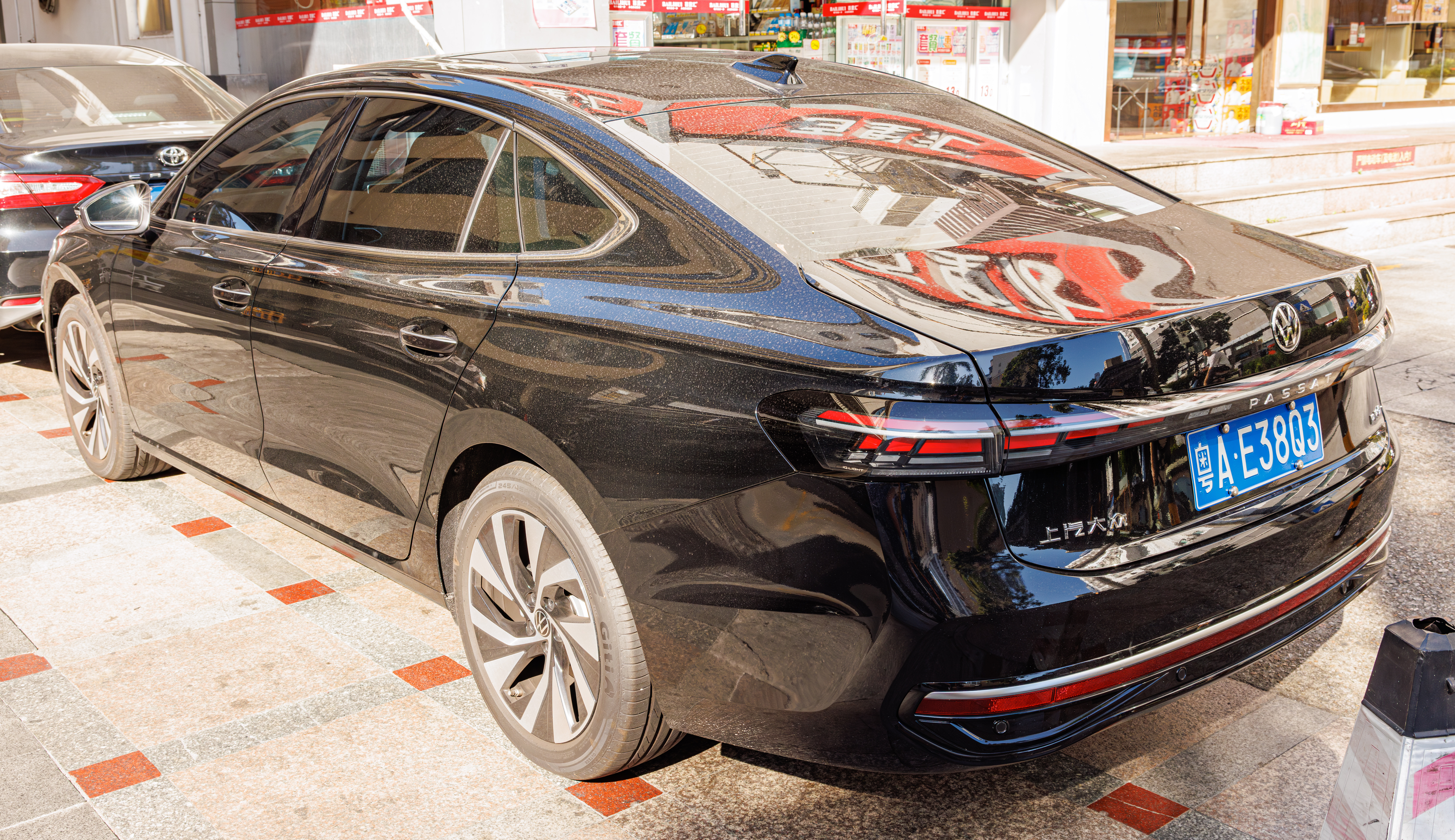
Rear view

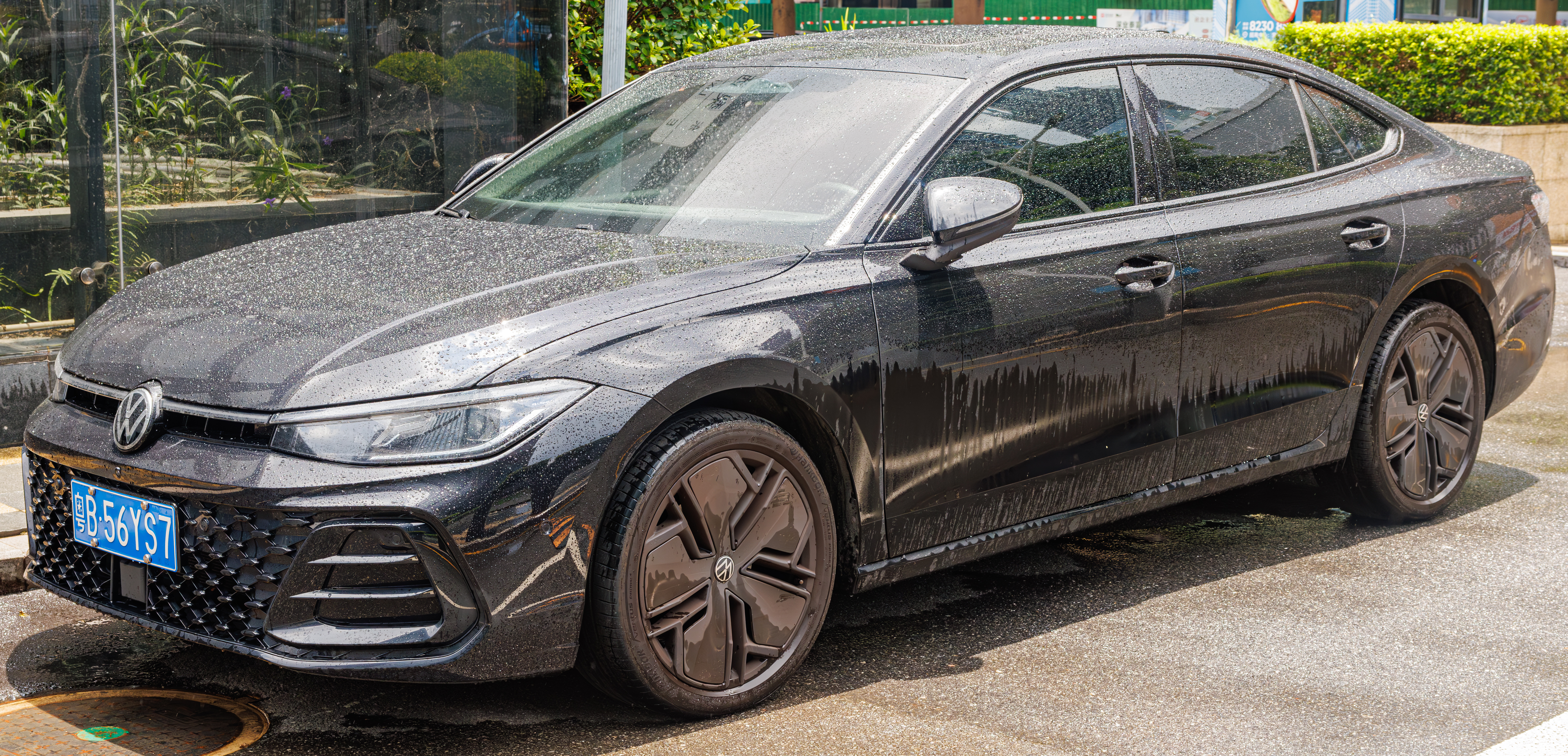
Volkswagen Passat Pro Sport

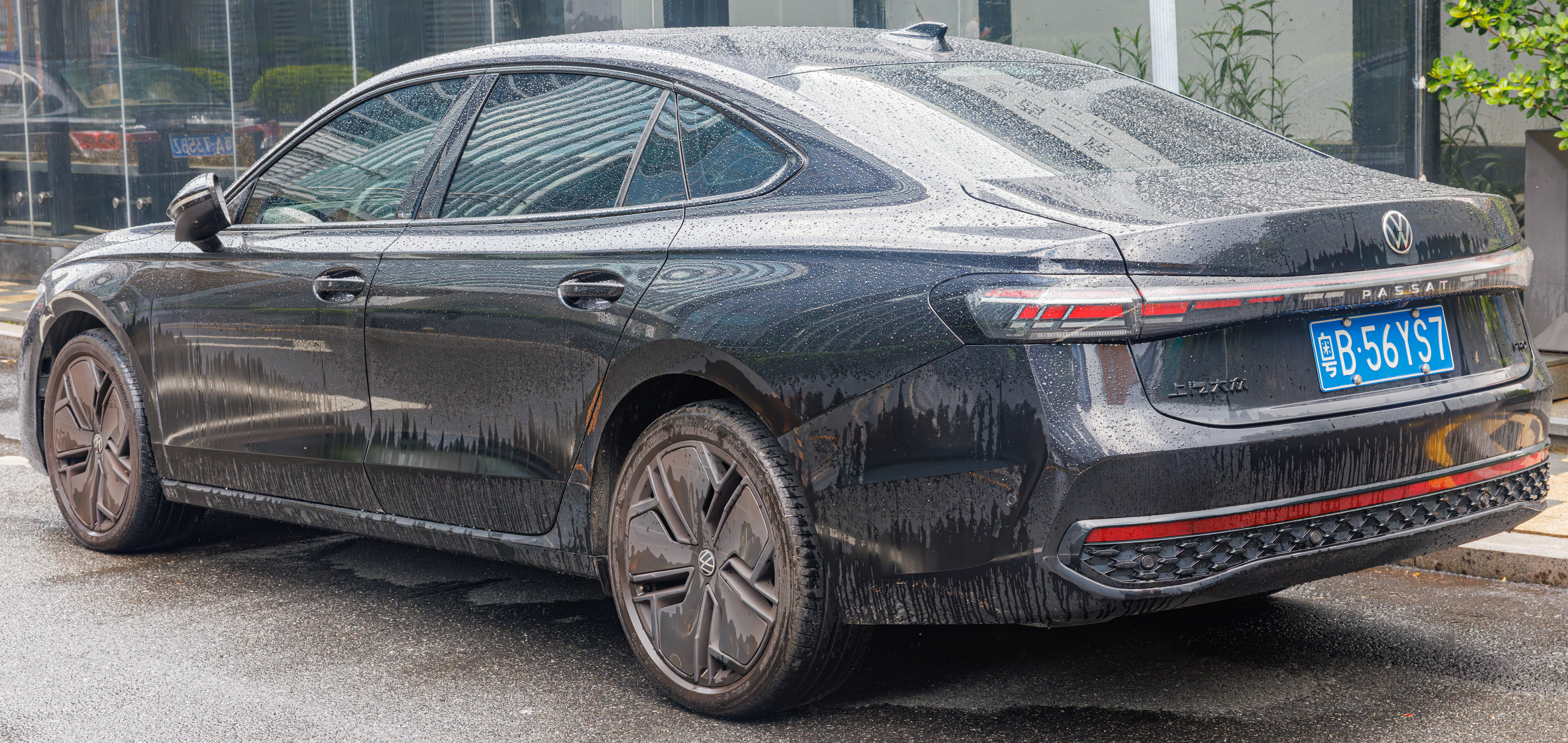
Rear view

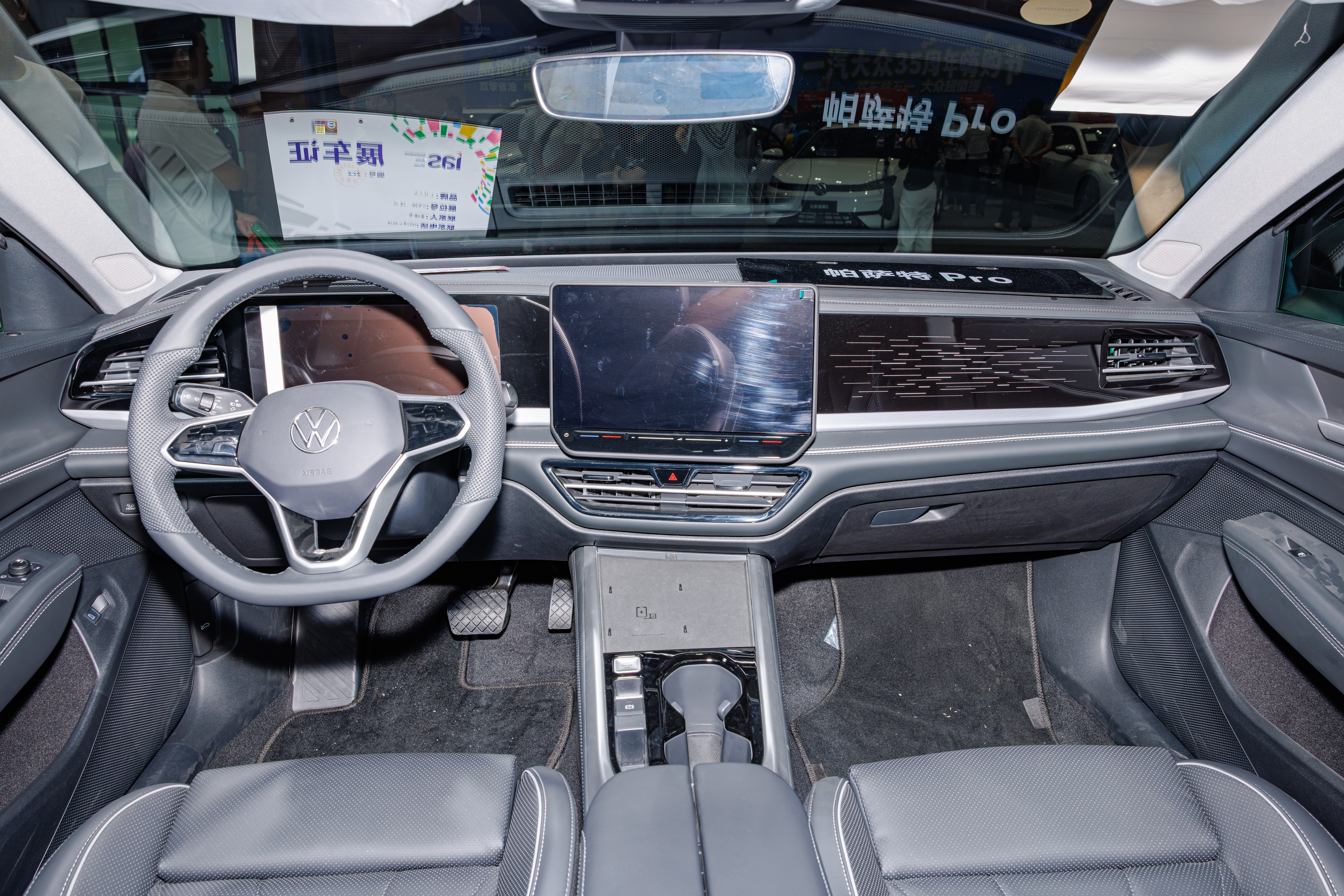
Interior

=== Passat ePro ===
The Passat ePro plug-in hybrid was announced in November 2025 at the Guangzhou Auto Show. It was announced at the 2026 Beijing Auto Show that it will be launched in late May 2026.

It features a unique front clip with a closed-off design compared to the standard version, with only a lower air intake.

It is equipped with a 1.5-liter engine outputting 127 hp (95 kW; 129 PS) and a single 194 hp (145 kW; 197 PS) electric motor, powered by a 22 kWh NMC battery pack weighing 163.5 kg (360 lb). It has a combined range of 1,468 km (912 mi).

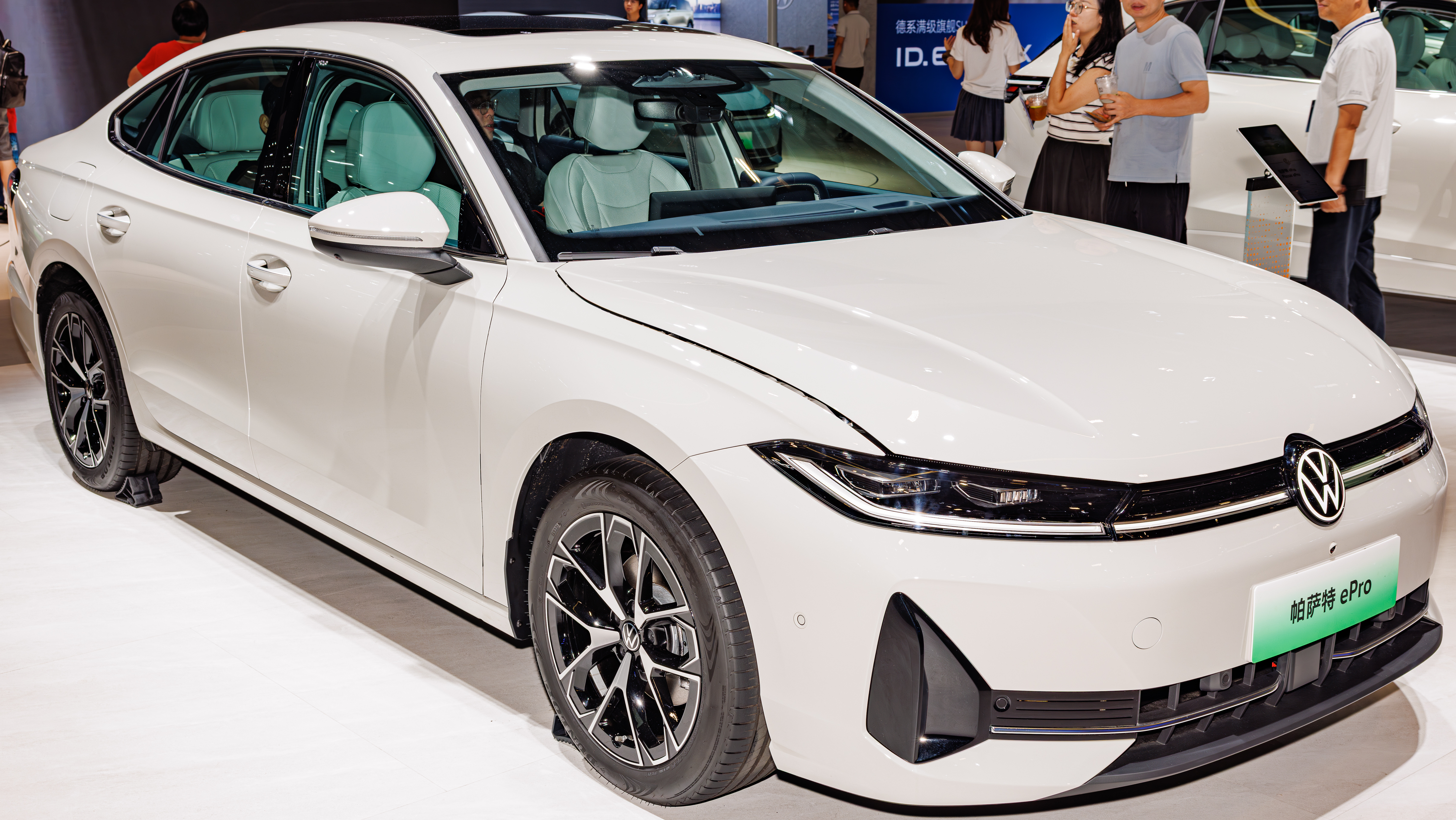
Volkswagen Passat ePro

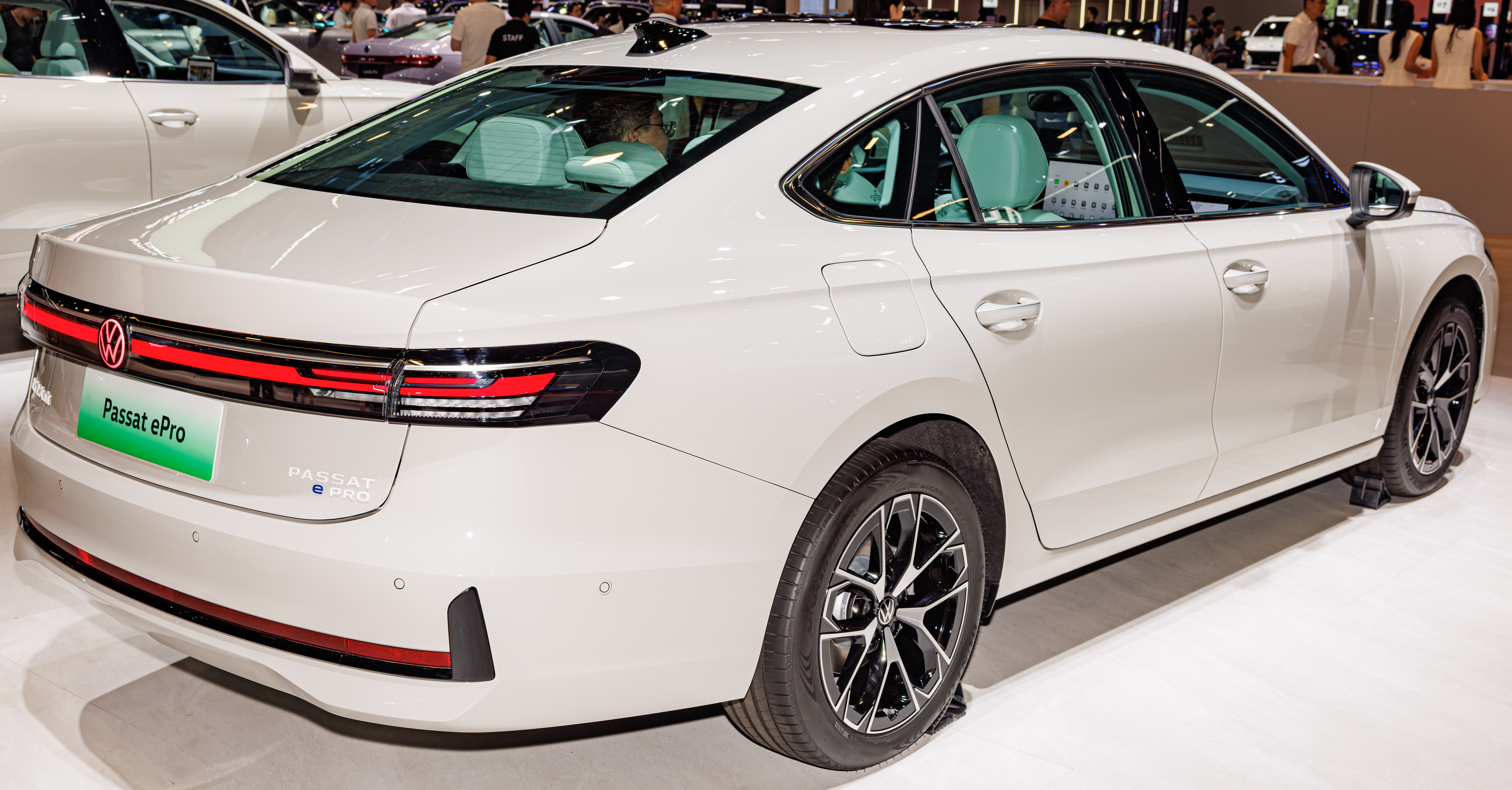
Rear view

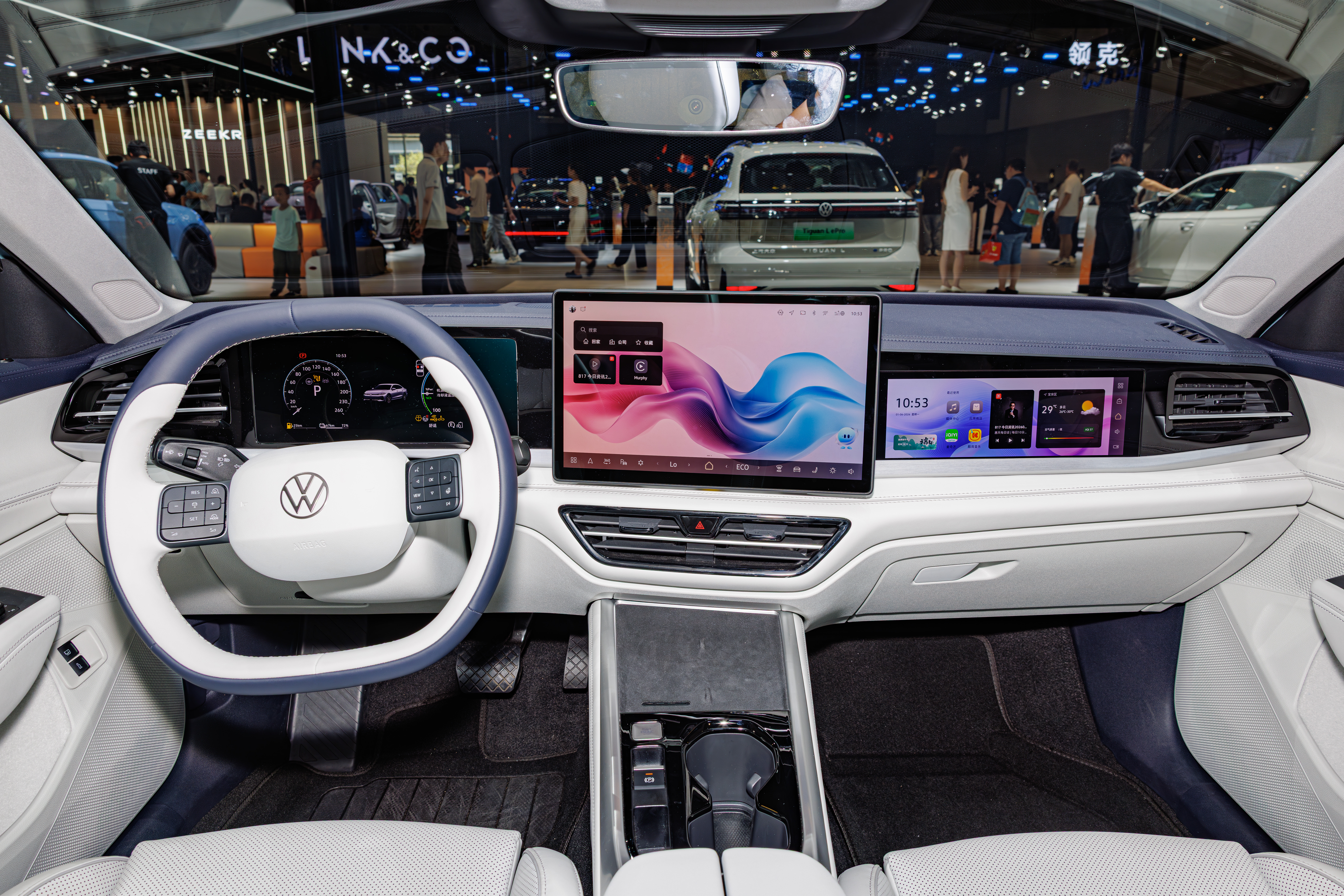
Interior

=== Powertrain ===
Specifications
Engine	Code	Power	Torque	Transmission	0–100 km/h 62 mph	Top speed
1,395 cc (1.395 L) turbo	EA211-DLE	150 PS (110 kW; 148 hp) @4,800–5,200	250 N⋅m (184 lb⋅ft) @1,550–3,200	7-speed dry clutch DCT	9.1 s	210 km/h 130 mph
1,498 cc (1.498 L) turbo Miller cycle	EA211-DSV	160 PS (118 kW; 158 hp) @5,500	250 N⋅m (184 lb⋅ft) @1,750–4,000	7-speed dry clutch DCT	9.5 s	210 km/h 130 mph
1,984 cc (1.984 L) turbo	EA888-DTH	186 PS (137 kW; 183 hp) @4,150–6,000	320 N⋅m (236 lb⋅ft) @1,500–4,050	7-speed wet clutch DCT	8.4 s	210 km/h 130 mph
1,984 cc (1.984 L) turbo	EA888-DTJ	220 PS (162 kW; 217 hp) @4,900–6,700	350 N⋅m (258 lb⋅ft) @1,600–4,300	7-speed wet clutch DCT	7.4 s	210 km/h 130 mph
