= Volkswagen Magotan =

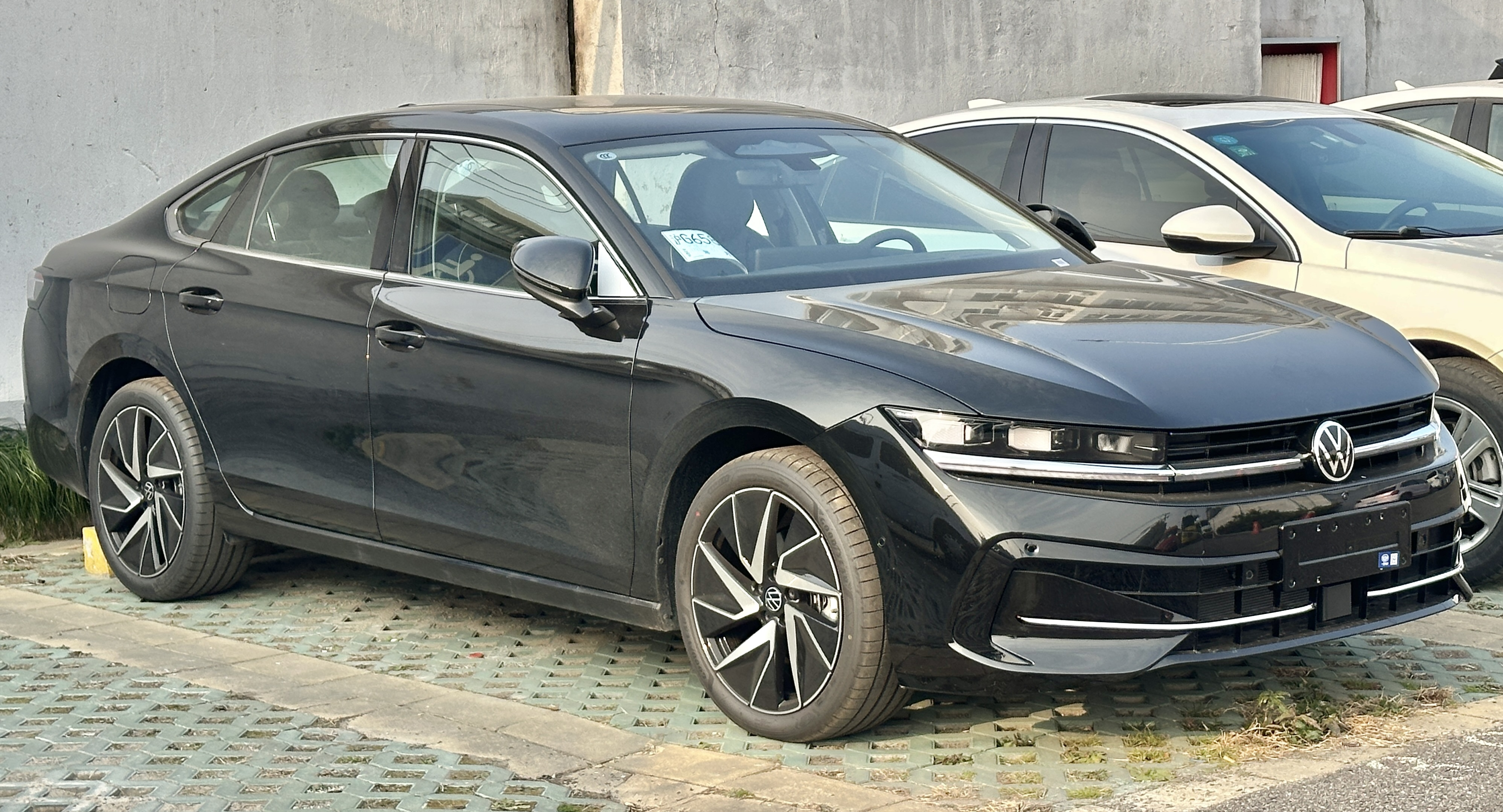

Overview
- Manufacturer: Volkswagen
- Also called: Volkswagen Passat
- Production: 2007–present
- Assembly: China: Changchun (FAW-VW)

Body and chassis
- Class: Mid-size car (D)
- Body style: 4-door sedan

The Volkswagen Magotan (Chinese: 大众迈腾; pinyin: Dàzhòng Màiténg) is a mid-size sedan manufactured by the Chinese automobile manufacturer FAW-Volkswagen as a sister model to the European Volkswagen Passat since 2007 in Changchun. In China, a different model is sold under the name Passat. This model is produced by SAIC Volkswagen.

== First generation (B6; 2007) ==
The Magotan, introduced in 2007, was initially available exclusively as a four-door sedan based on the Volkswagen Passat (B6). In late 2010, a station wagon followed under the separate model name Volkswagen Variant. Volkswagen chose not to use the Magotan name for the station wagon because, unlike the sedan, it was not manufactured in China but imported from Germany. Since the Variant was significantly more expensive due to this, the manufacturer wanted to distinguish the two versions from each other.

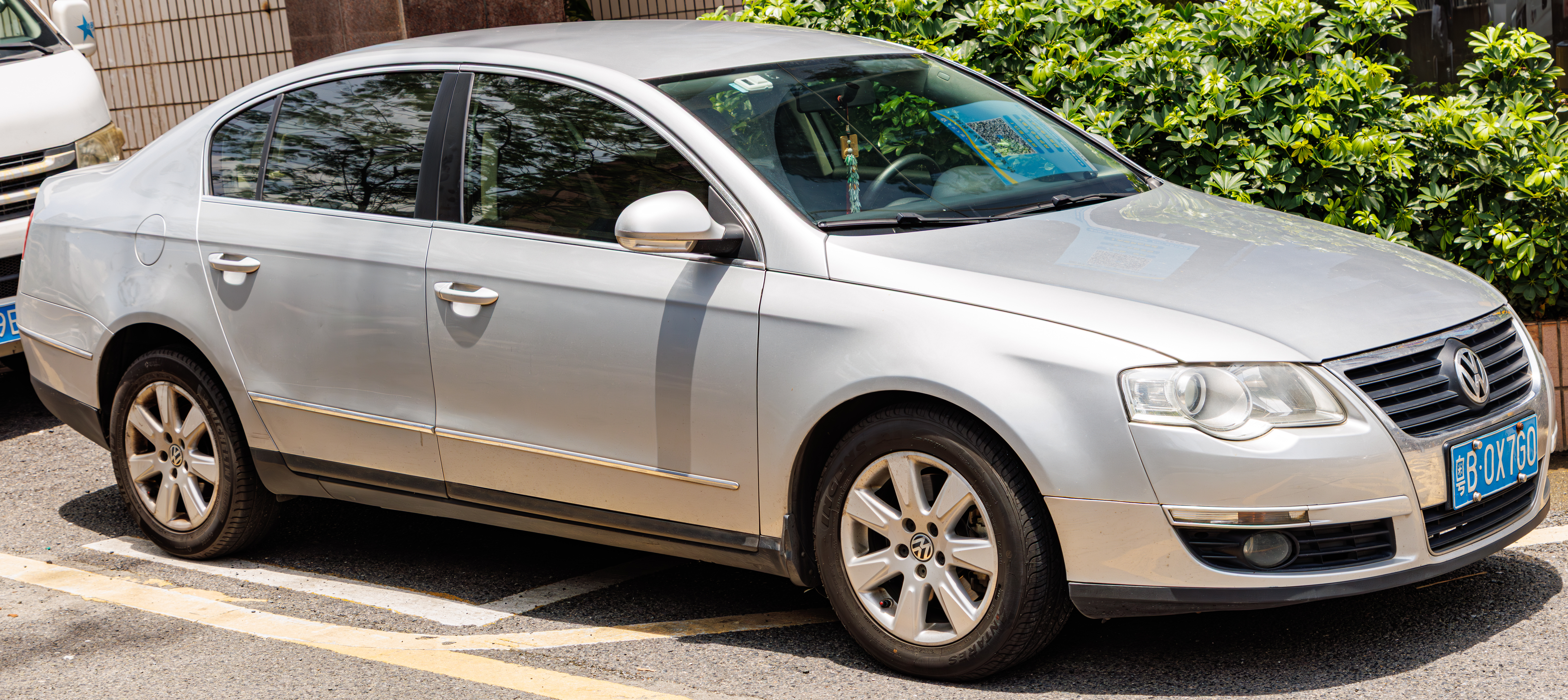
Volkswagen Magotan (front)

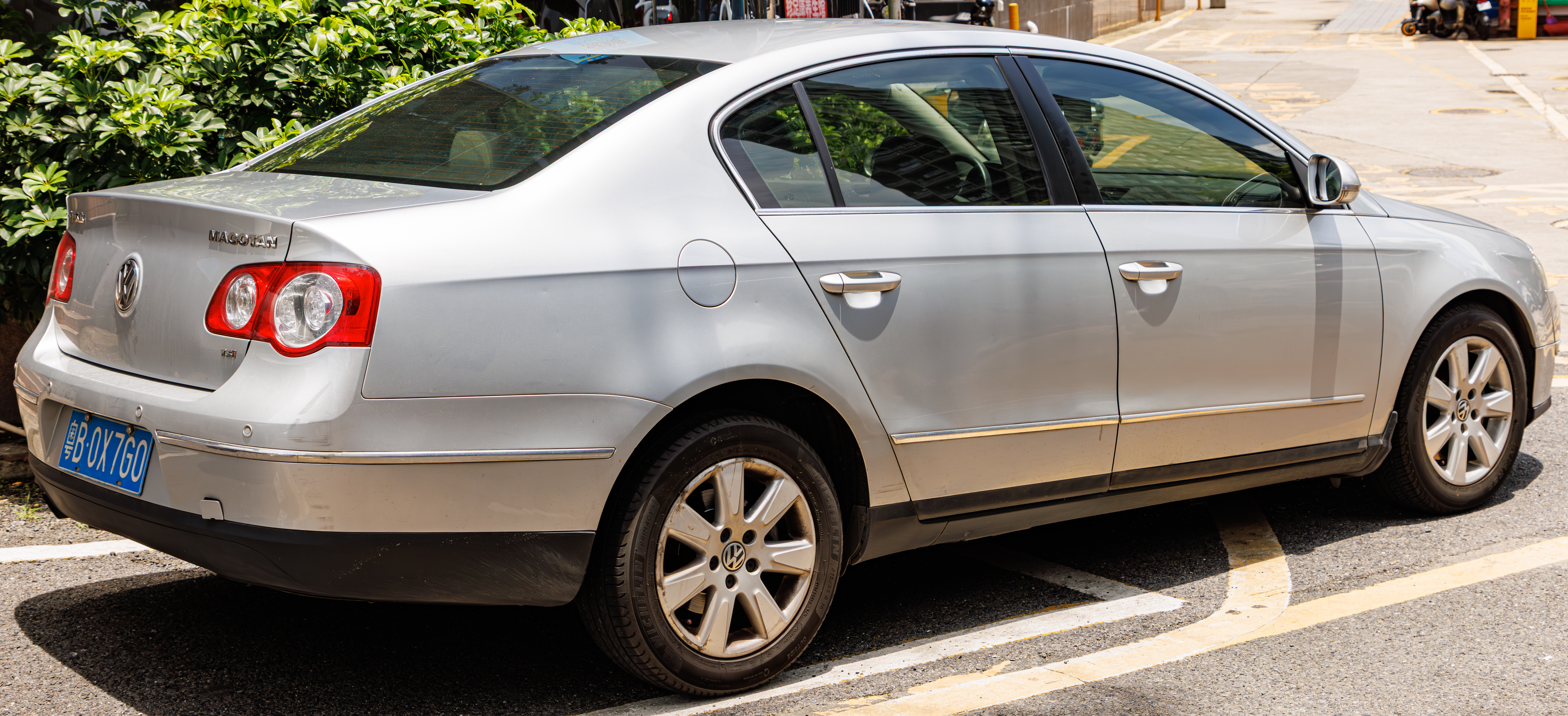
Volkswagen Magotan (rear)

== Second generation (B7; 2011) ==
In December 2011, the second generation of the Magotan was introduced, based on the Volkswagen Passat (B7). However, the Magotan Variant and the Magotan Alltrack, which was offered from September 2012, were not produced in China but were manufactured at the Volkswagen Emden Plant. Unlike the previous model, these two variants were now also named Magotan. The sedan built in China is approximately ten centimeters longer compared to the European version.

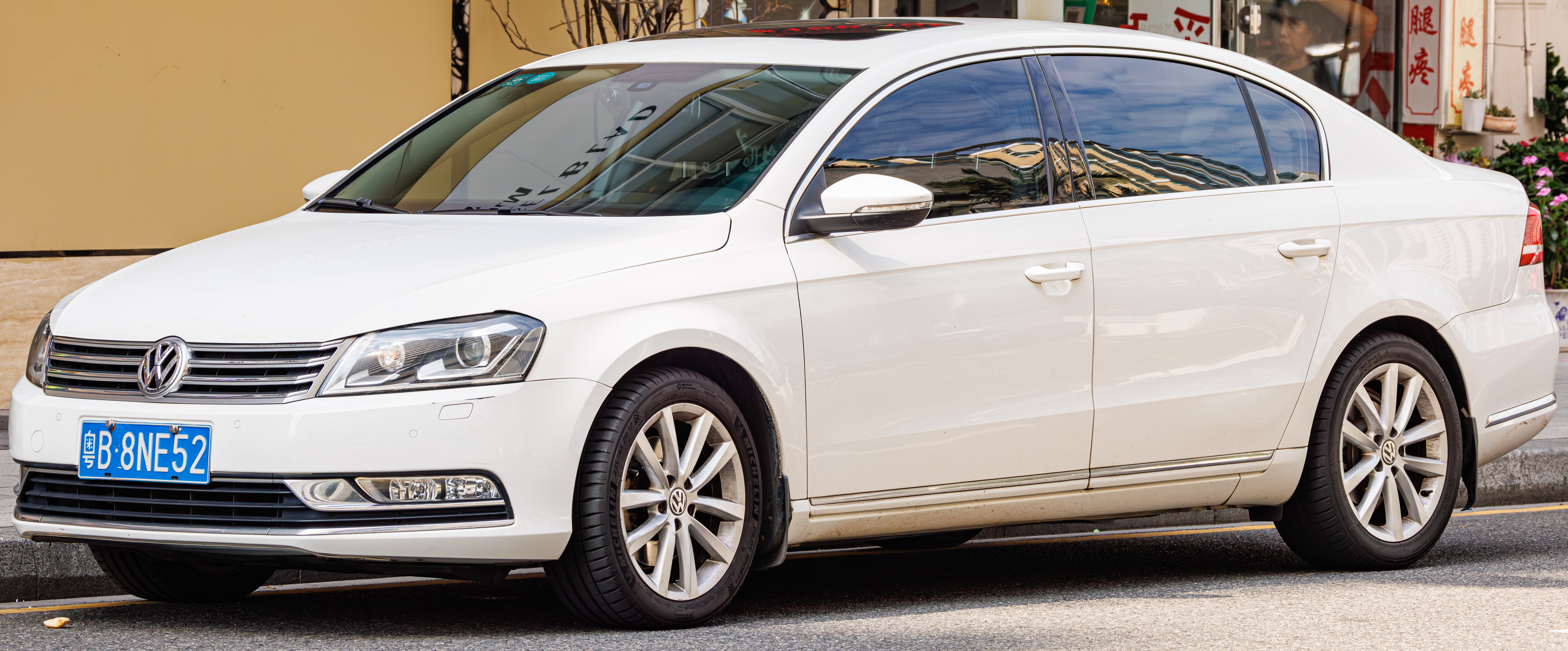
Volkswagen Magotan (front)

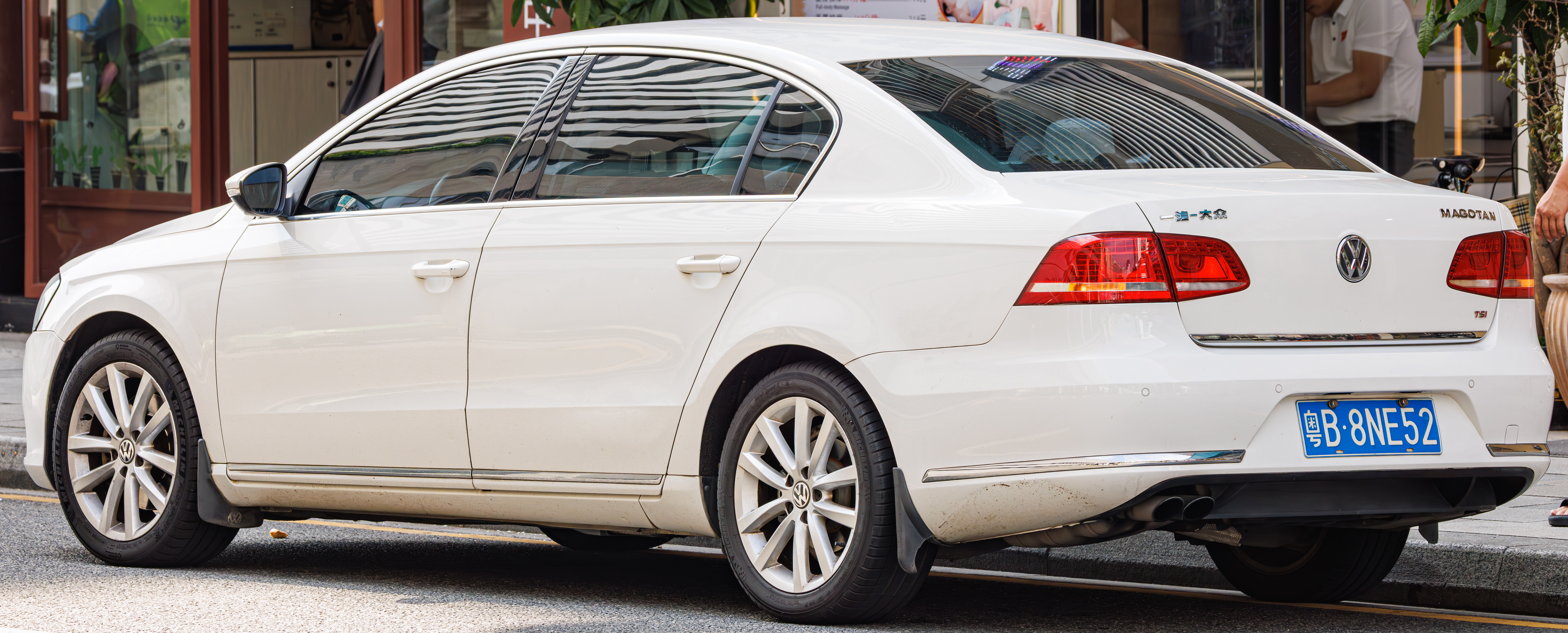
Volkswagen Magotan (rear)

== Third generation (B8; 2016) ==
The third generation, based on the Volkswagen Passat B8 and introduced on July 20, 2016, includes the Volkswagen Variant, the Volkswagen Alltrack, and the long-wheelbase version Volkswagen Magotan, which are manufactured in China. Since December 2019, the Magotan has also been available as a plug-in hybrid, featuring the drivetrain from the Passat GTE. An updated version of the sedan was unveiled in September 2022.

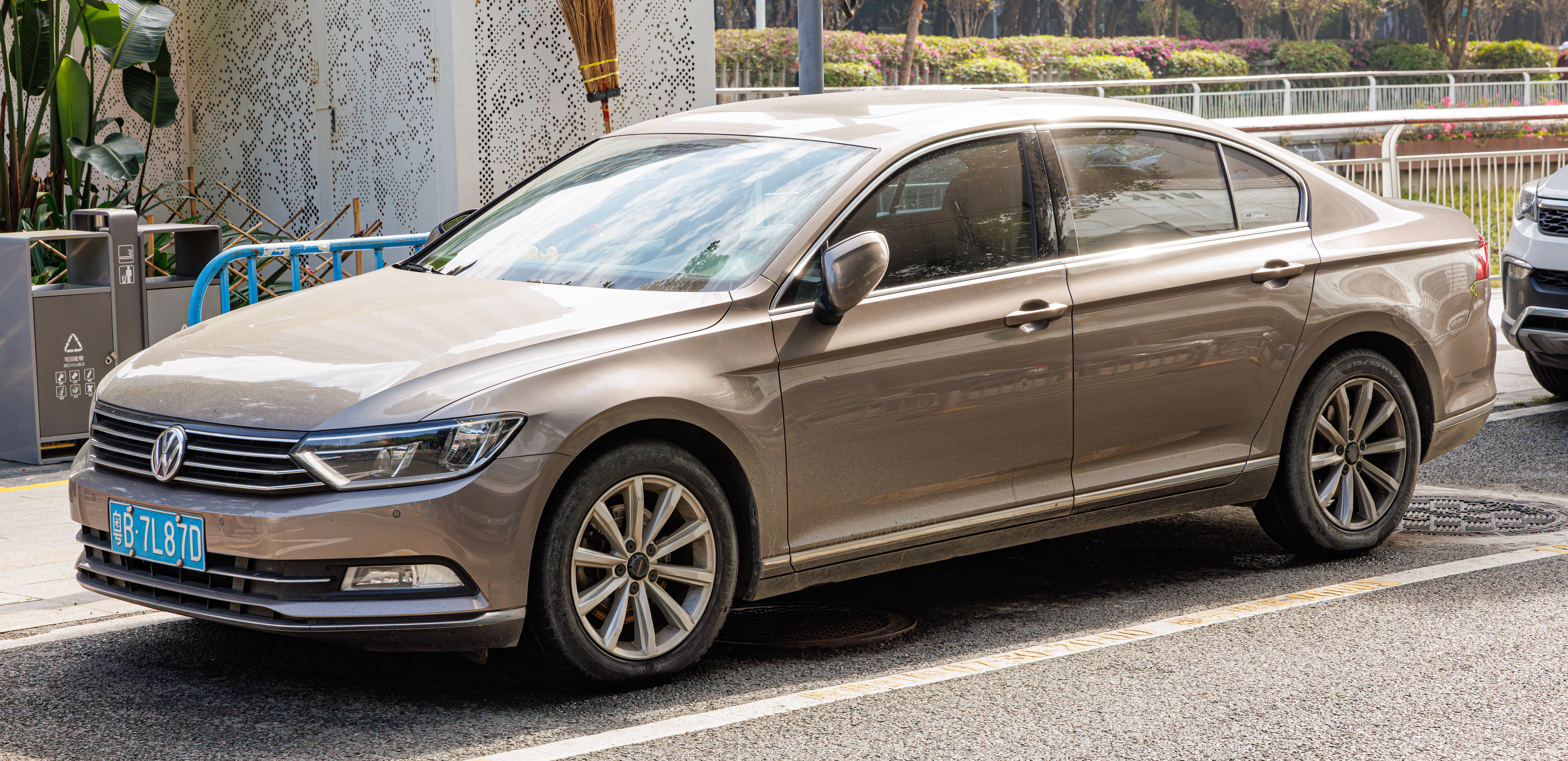
Volkswagen Magotan (pre-facelift; front)

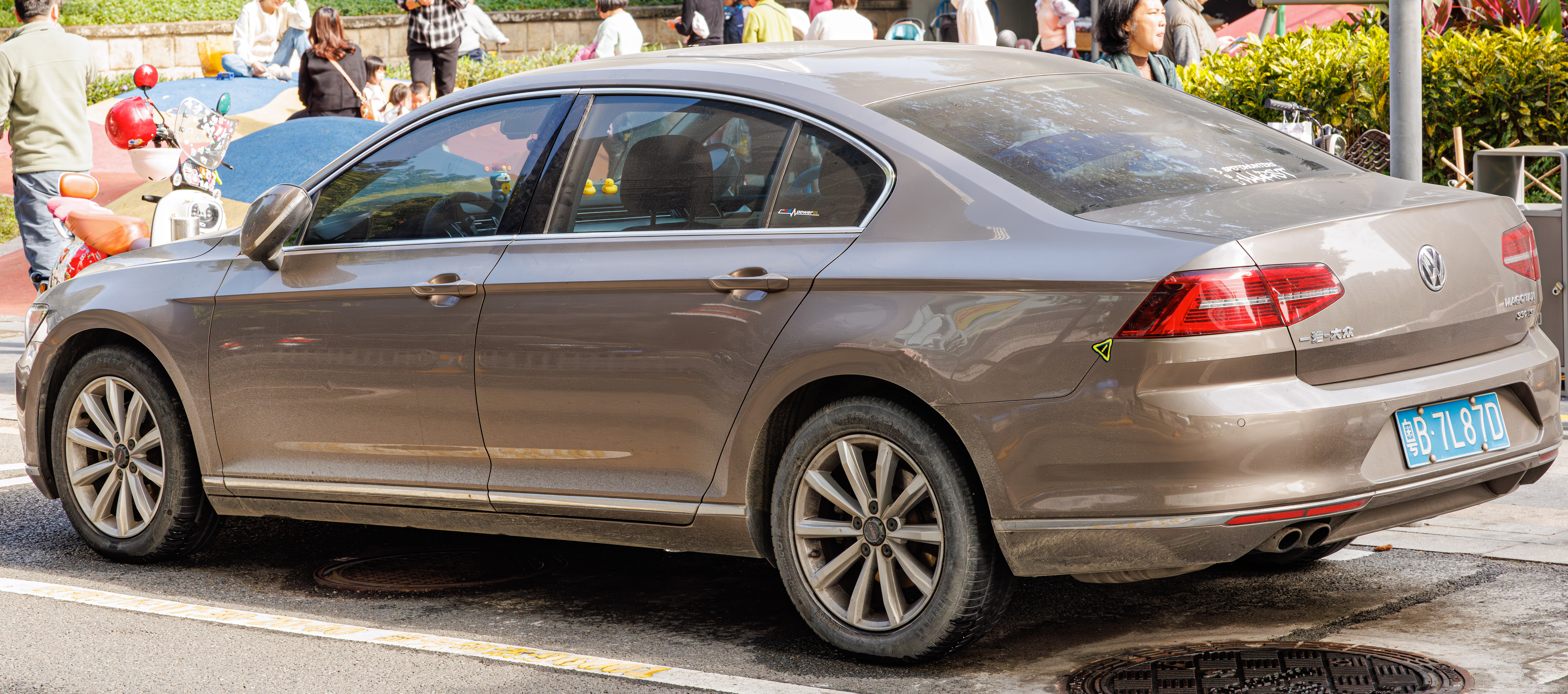
Volkswagen Magotan (pre-facelift; rear)

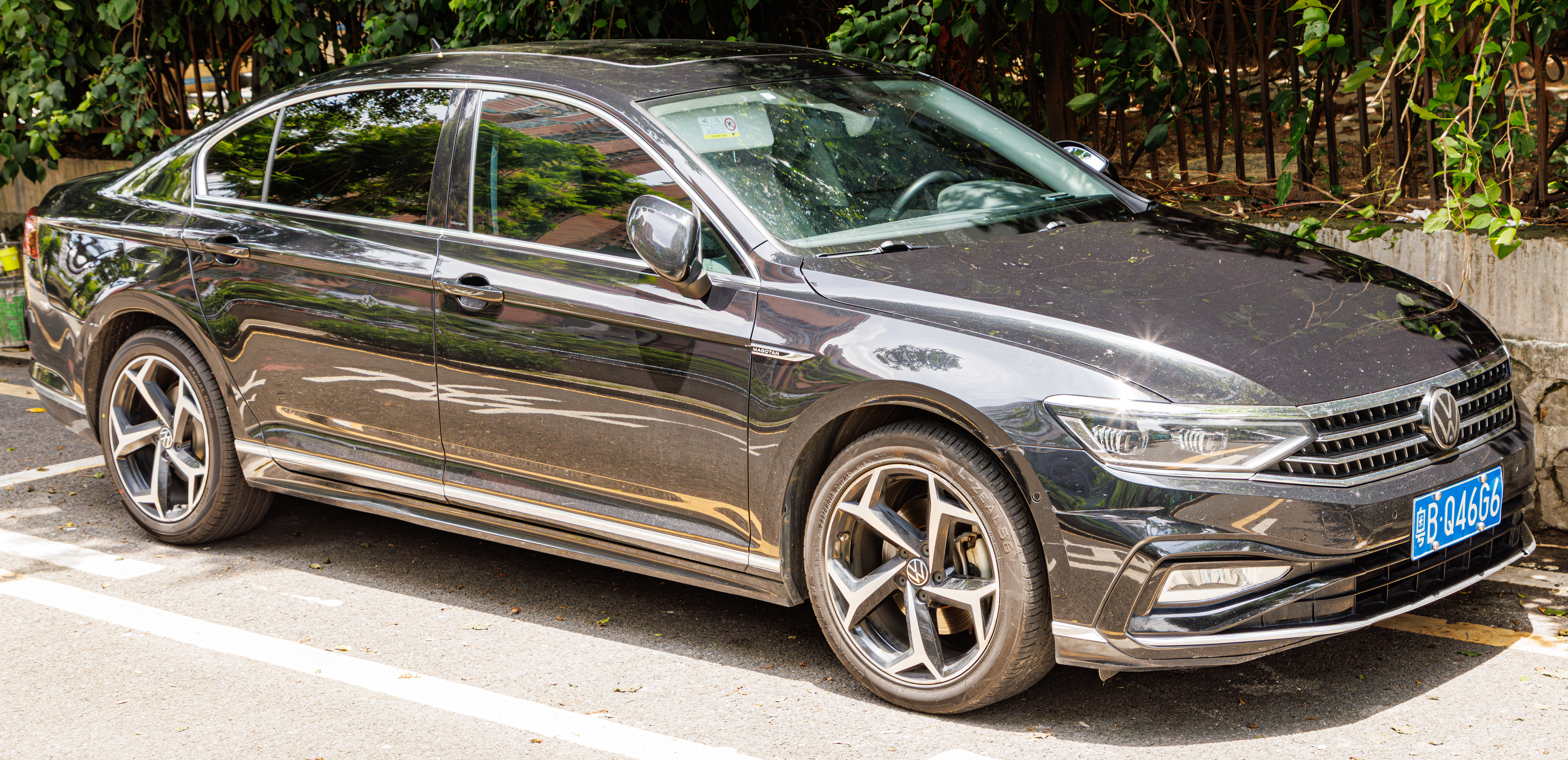
Volkswagen Magotan (facelift; front)

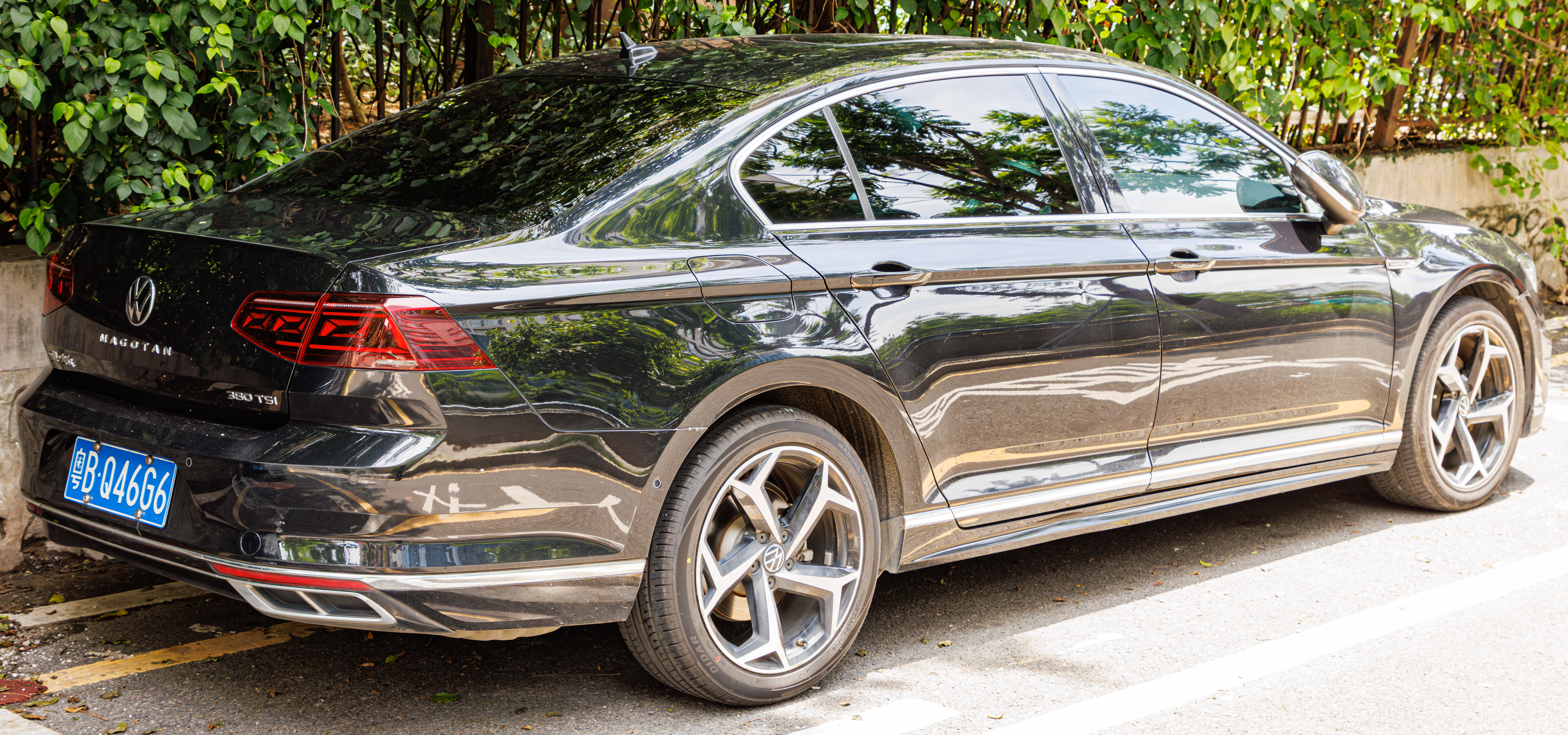
Volkswagen Magotan (facelift; rear)

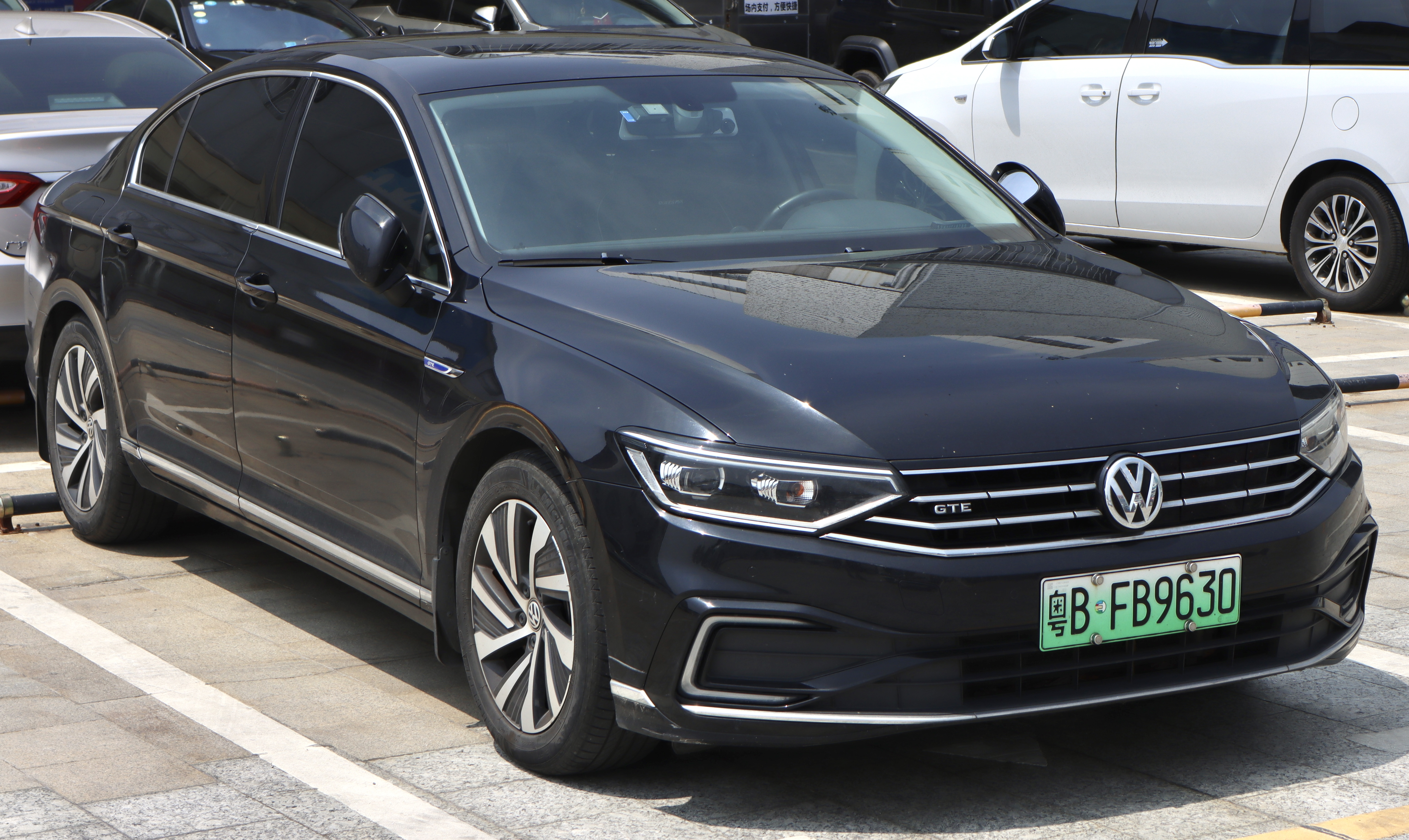
Volkswagen Magotan GTE

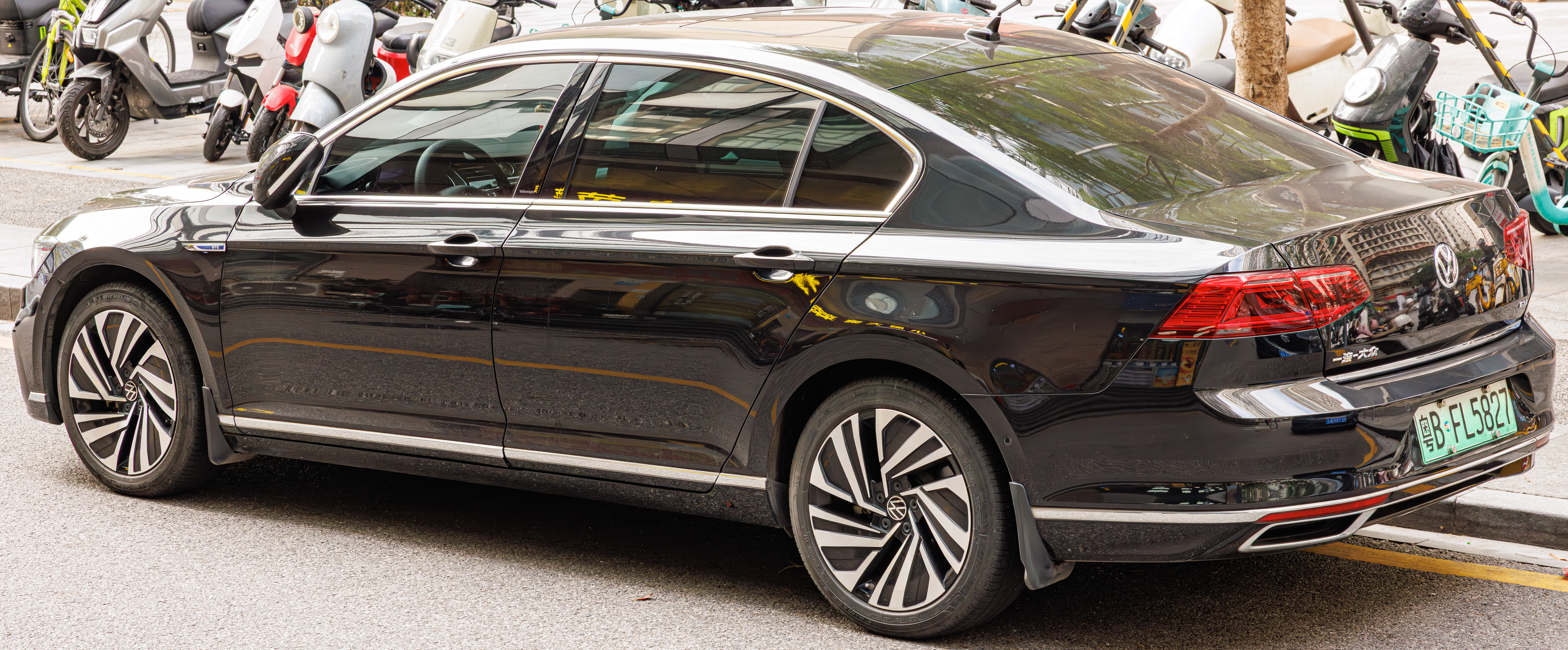
Volkswagen Magotan GTE

== Fourth generation (B9; 2024) ==
Volkswagen Magotan (B9)
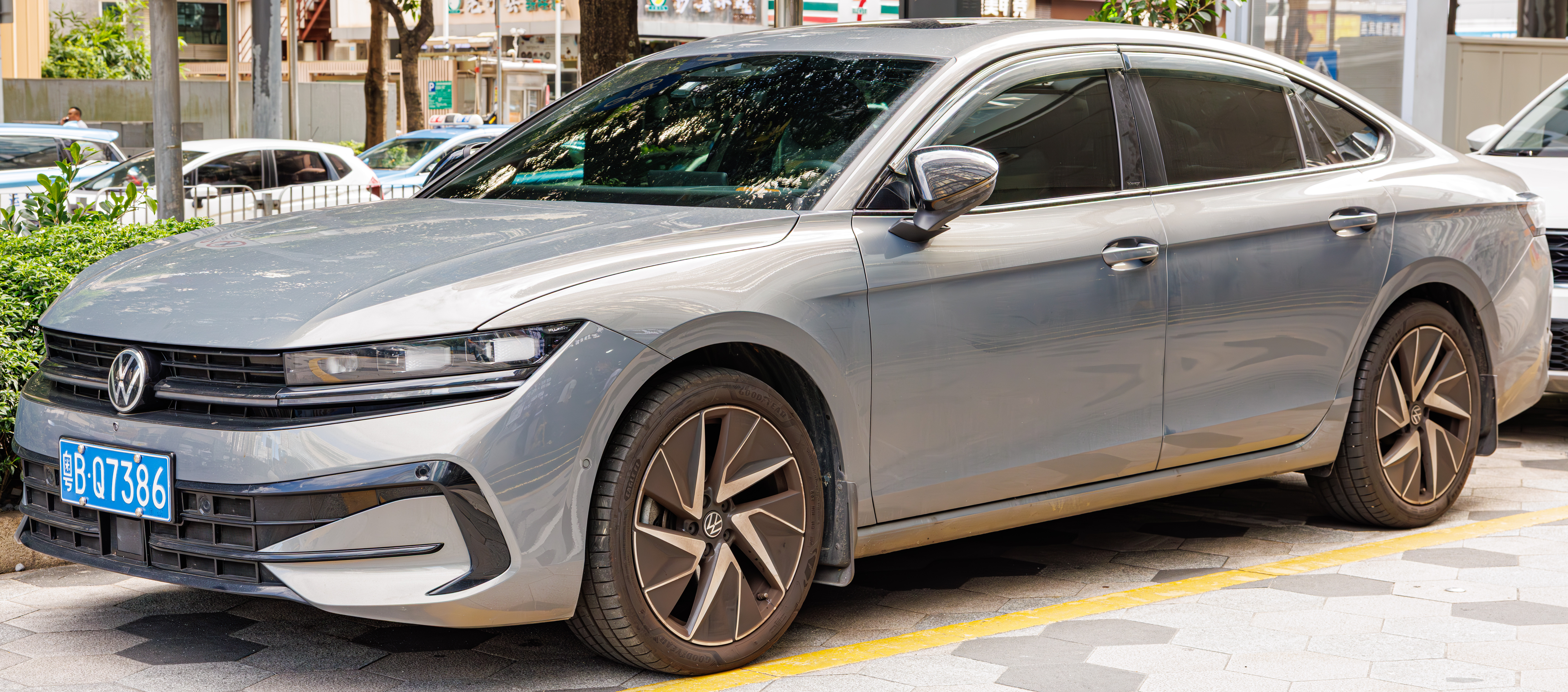

Overview
- Also called: Volkswagen Passat (Middle East and Kazakhstan)
- Production: 2024–present
- Model years: 2026–present (Middle East)
- Assembly: China: Changchun (FAW-VW)

Body and chassis
- Layout: Front-engine, front-wheel-drive
- Platform: Volkswagen Group MQB Evo
- Related: Volkswagen Passat Variant (B9); Volkswagen Passat Pro; Škoda Superb Mk4

Powertrain
- Engine: Petrol: 1.5 L DSV TSI I4; 2.0 L DTJ TSI I4
- Transmission: 7-speed DSG

Dimensions
- Wheelbase: 2,871 mm (113.0 in)
- Length: 4,990 mm (196.5 in)
- Width: 1,854 mm (73.0 in)
- Height: 1,487 mm (58.5 in)
- Curb weight: 1,544–1,684 kg (3,404–3,713 lb)

Chronology
- Predecessor: Volkswagen Passat (Middle East)

The first images of the fourth generation were released in January 2024 by the Chinese Ministry of Industry and Information Technology as part of the homologation process. The vehicle made its public debut in April 2024 at the Beijing Auto Show. Market launch in China took place in June 2024. Since the Volkswagen Passat B9 is now only available as a Variant, this generation of the Magotan features a more independent design. Additionally, it is over twelve centimeters longer than its predecessor. Similar to the Magotan B9, there is also the Volkswagen Passat Pro, built by SAIC, which was unveiled in August 2024.

The Magotan features differentiated exterior styling compared to the estate model, the interior features an 11.6-inch touchscreen display for the front passenger and the rocker switch for the automatic transmission placed in the centre console, iFLYTEK's AI voice control feature, IQ. Pilot intelligent driving assistance system that is developed in collaboration with DJI, and additional luxury features.

Starting in November 2025, the car is marketed in the Middle East as the Volkswagen Passat.

In August 2026, the car is also marketed in Kazakhstan as the Volkswagen Passat.

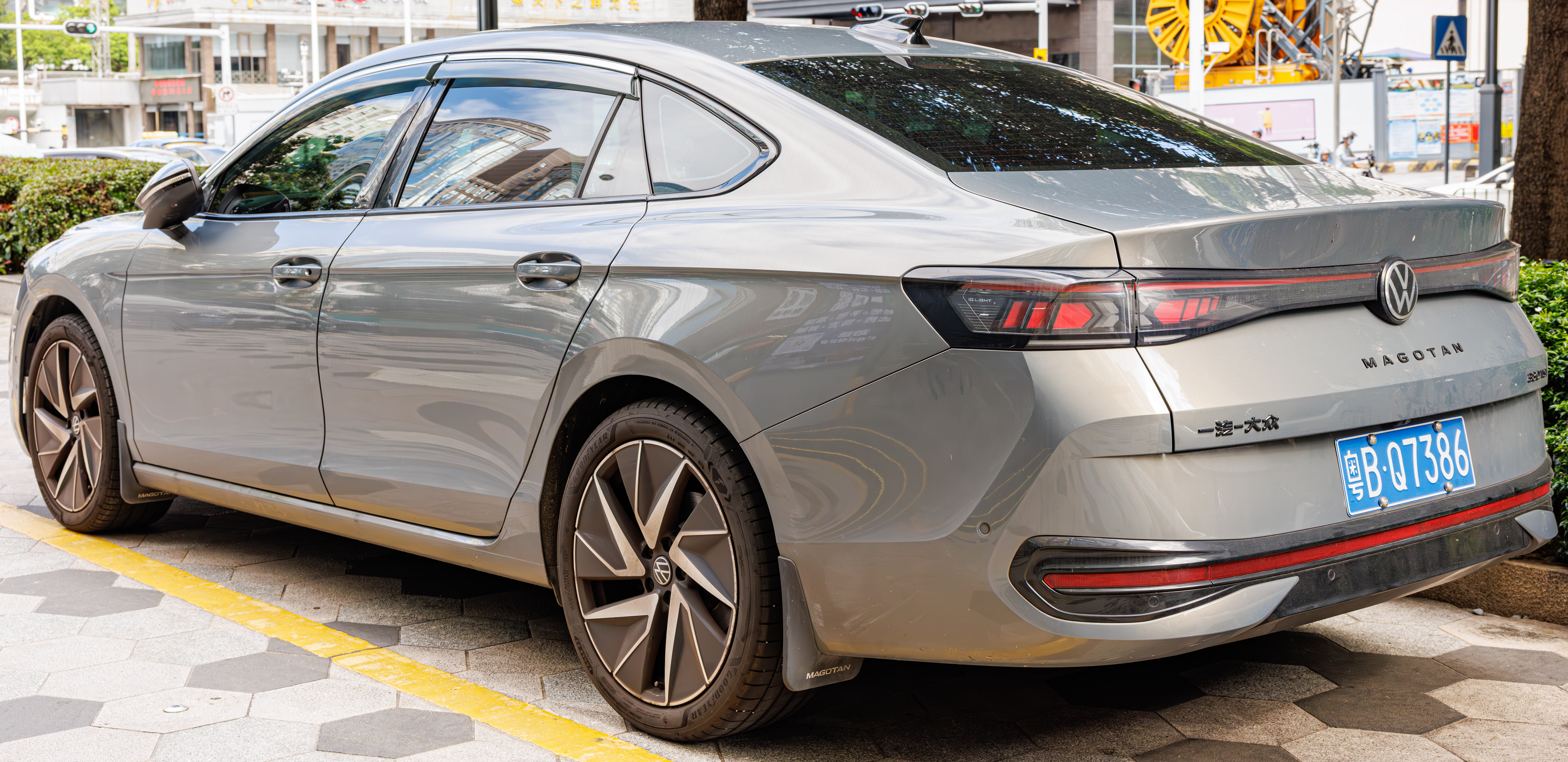
Rear view

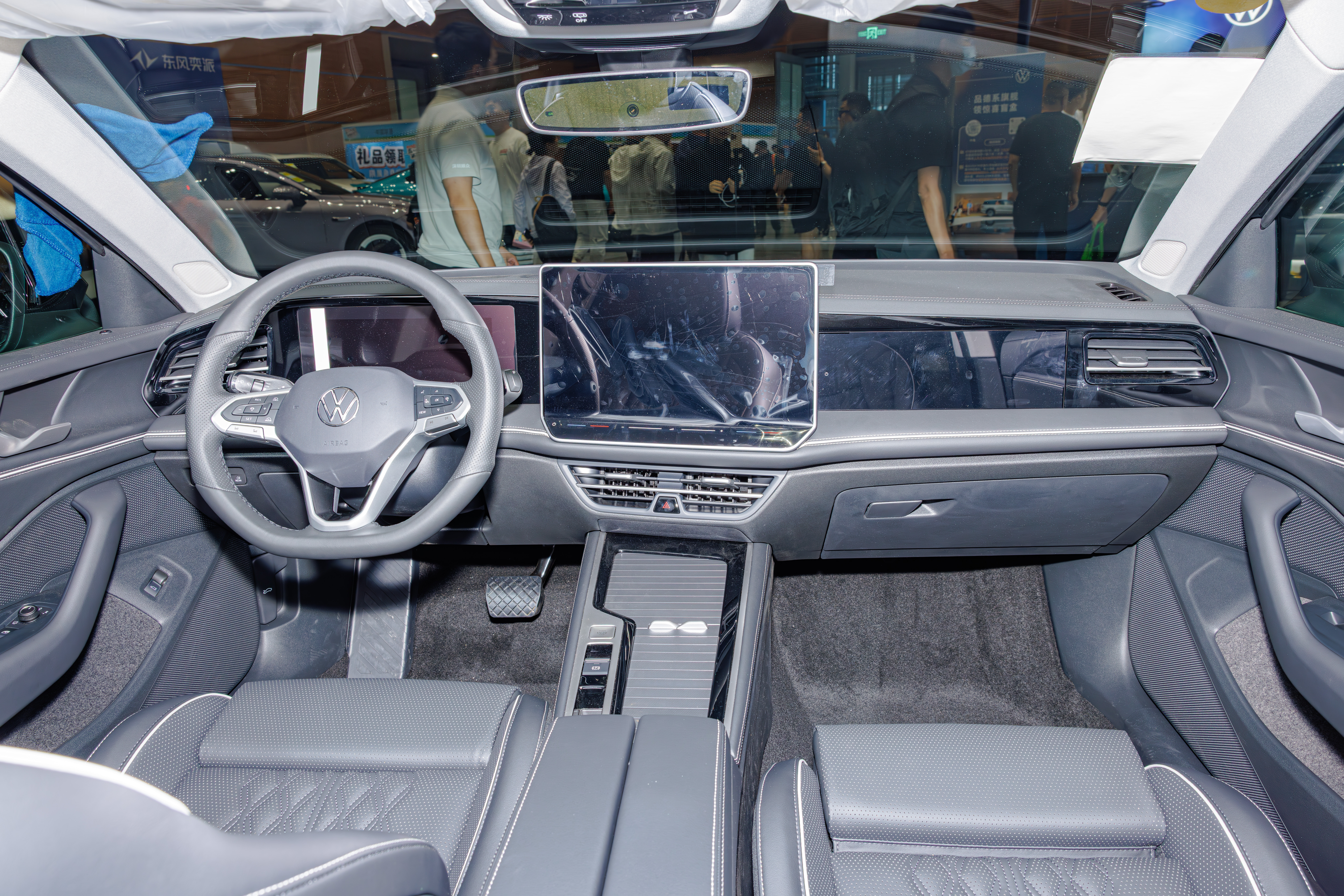
Interior
