= Volkswagen Passat (B8) =

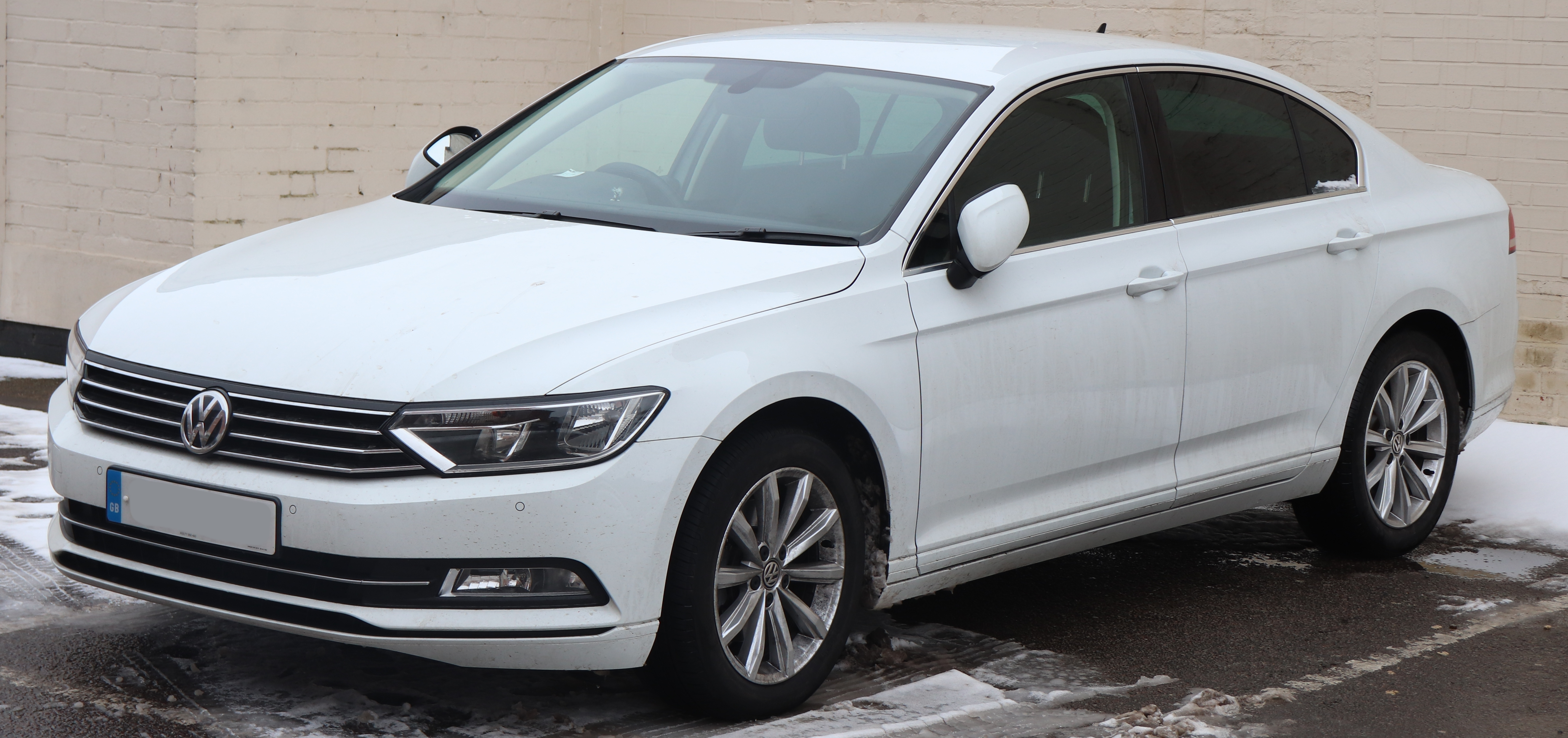

Overview
- Manufacturer: Volkswagen
- Also called: Volkswagen Magotan (China)
- Production: 2014–December 2021 (saloon, Europe); 2014–2023 (estate); 2016–2024 (Magotan)
- Assembly: Germany: Emden, Lower Saxony; Zwickau, Saxony (Zwickau-Mosel Plant); China: Changchun (FAW-VW: Magotan); India: Aurangabad (CKD: 2017–2020); Malaysia: Pekan (HICOM; CKD: 2016–2022)
- Designer: Walter de Silva

Body and chassis
- Class: Mid-size car (D)
- Body style: 4-door sedan; 5-door estate
- Layout: Front-engine, front-wheel-drive; Front-engine, four-wheel-drive (4motion)
- Platform: Volkswagen Group MQB
- Related: Volkswagen Passat (China, 2019); Volkswagen Arteon; Volkswagen Tiguan Mk2; Škoda Superb (B8)

Powertrain
- Engine: Petrol: 1.4 L EA211 TSI I4; 1.4 L EA211 TSI PHEV I4; 1.5 L EA211 EVO TSI I4; 1.8 L EA888 TSI I4; 2.0 L EA888 TSI I4; Diesel: 1.6 L TDI CR I4; 2.0 L TDI CR I4; 2.0 L BiTDI CR I4
- Electric motor: Permanent magnet synchronous (e-Hybrid)
- Transmission: 6-speed manual; 6-speed DSG dual clutch automatic; 7-speed DSG dual clutch automatic

Dimensions
- Wheelbase: 2,786–2,791 mm (109.7–109.9 in); 2,871 mm (113.0 in) (Magotan)
- Length: 4,767 mm (187.7 in); 4,866 mm (191.6 in) (Magotan)
- Width: 1,832 mm (72.1 in)
- Height: 1,456 mm (57.3 in) (saloon); 1,477 mm (58.1 in) (estate); 1,464 mm (57.6 in) (Magotan)
- Kerb weight: 1,367–1,735 kg (3,014–3,825 lb)

Chronology
- Predecessor: Volkswagen Passat (B7)
- Successor: Volkswagen Passat (B9); Volkswagen Magotan (fourth generation) (China); Volkswagen ID.7 (saloon)

The Volkswagen Passat (B8) is a mid-size car / large family car (D-segment) manufactured by Volkswagen from 2014 to 2023, replacing the Passat B6/B7 models. It is available in a 4-door saloon and a 5-door estate sold as "Variant" in some markets. It was first introduced at the Volkswagen Design Center Potsdam on 3 July 2014. The B8 is the eighth-generation model in the Volkswagen Passat series and the first passenger vehicle of Volkswagen Group to be based on an enlarged version of the MQB platform.

A facelift model was revealed in February 2019, changes include updated front and rear fascias with new lighting, the interior received the MIB3 infotainment system and updated graphics from the instrument cluster, new safety features, and updated engine line-up.

For the European market, the B8 was assembled in the Emden and Zwickau Volkswagen production plants in Germany. Sales of European domestic market models began in November 2014.

The GTE, a plug-in hybrid version, was introduced at the 2014 Paris Motor Show for sale during the second half of 2015 in Europe.

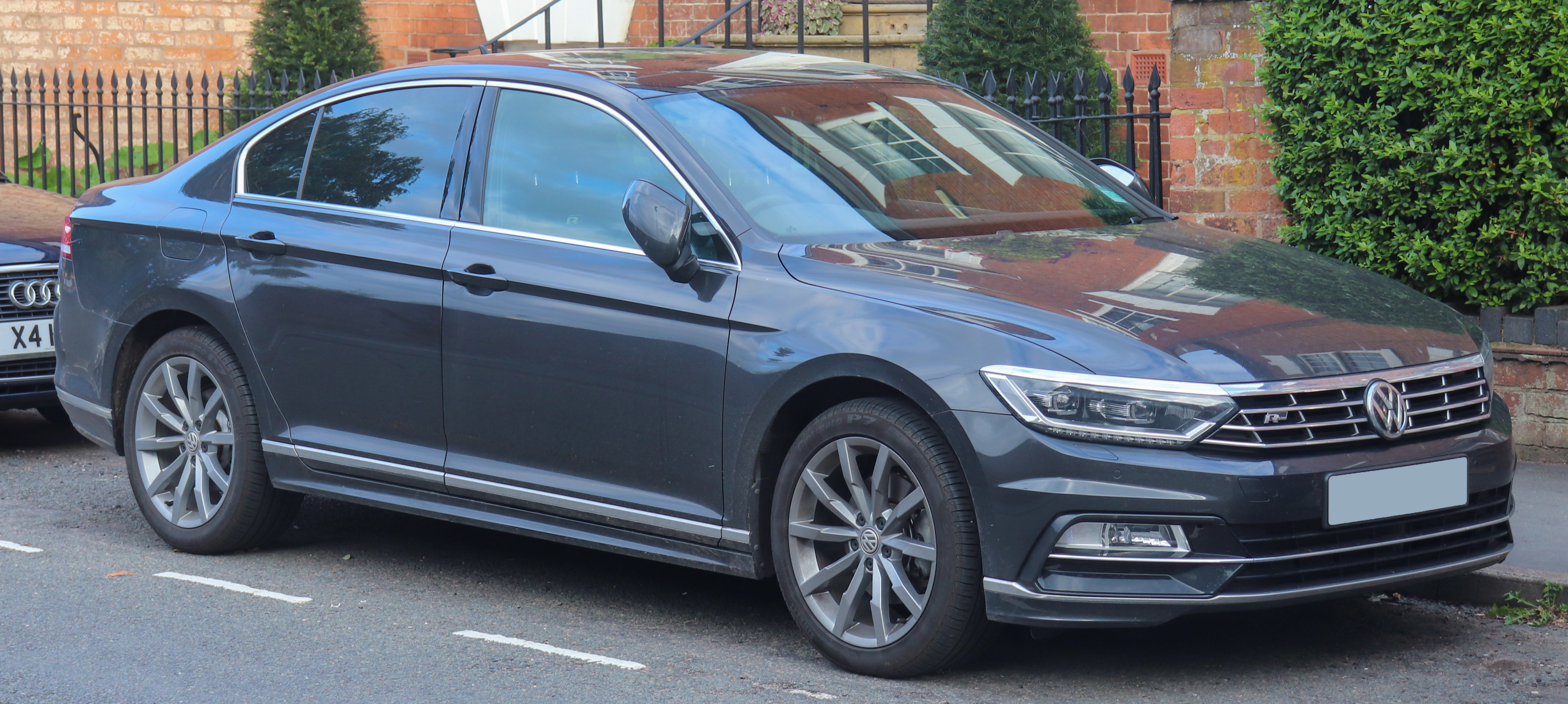
R-Line

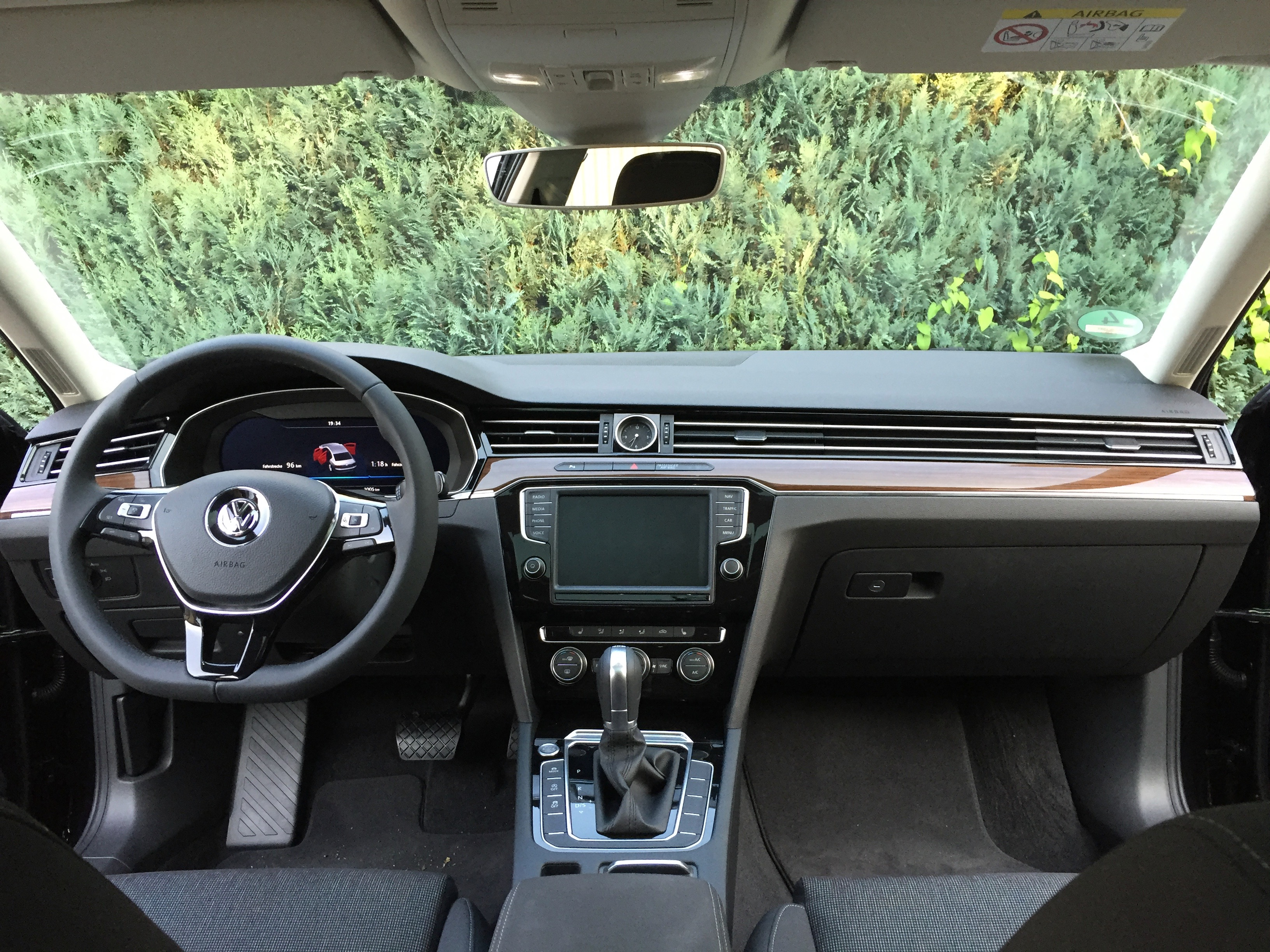
Interior

== Design ==
=== Development ===
Being based on the stretched variant of the MQB platform, a modular automobile construction platform designed for transverse, front-engined cars, the B8 Passat has more interior space than the last-generation model despite being shorter and 18 mm lower. The front wheels were moved forward and the wheelbase extended by 79 mm resulting in a shorter front overhang and a bigger cabin. The B8 Passat weighs 73 kg less than the previous version by using aluminium vacuum-formed steel.

Pre-facelift

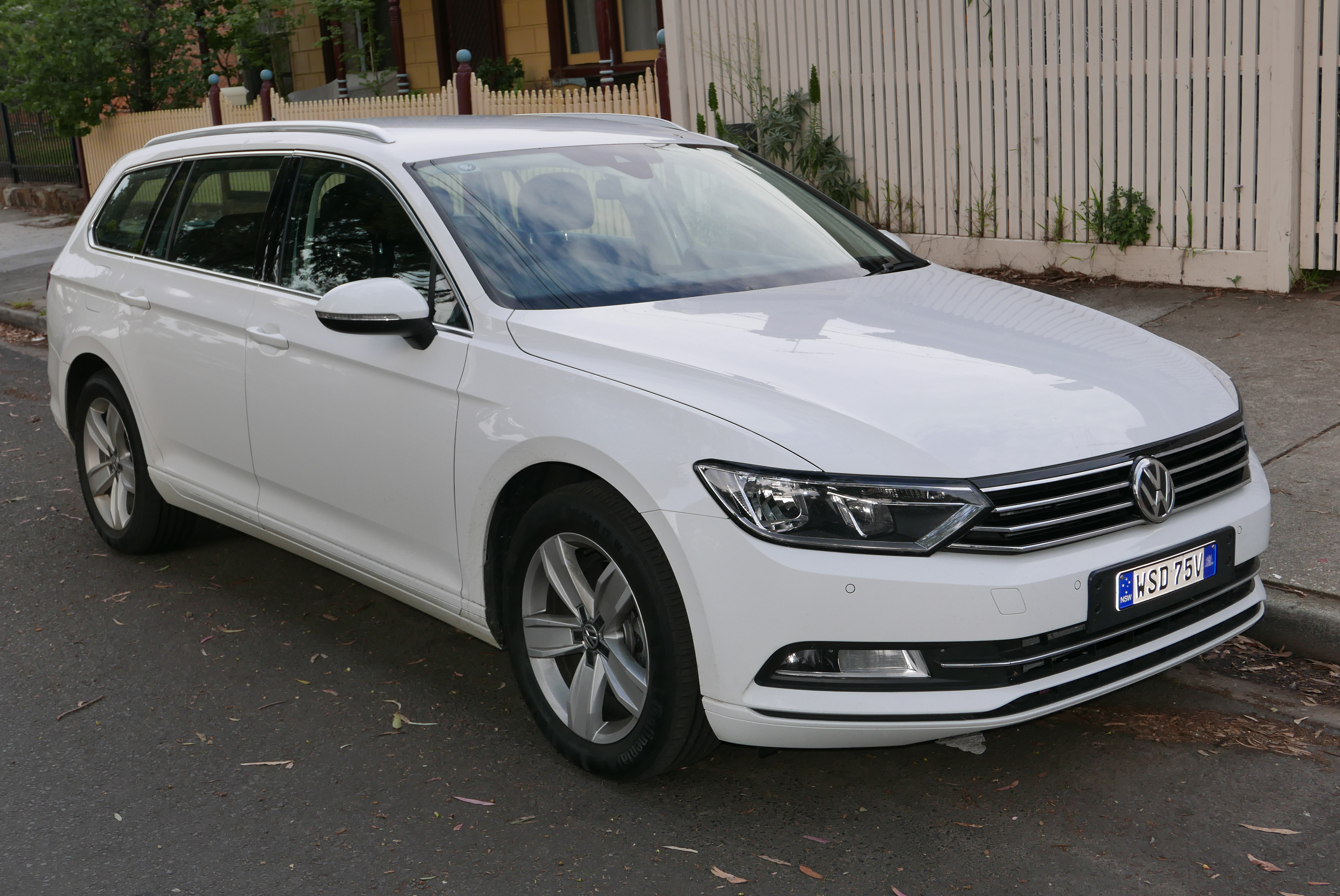

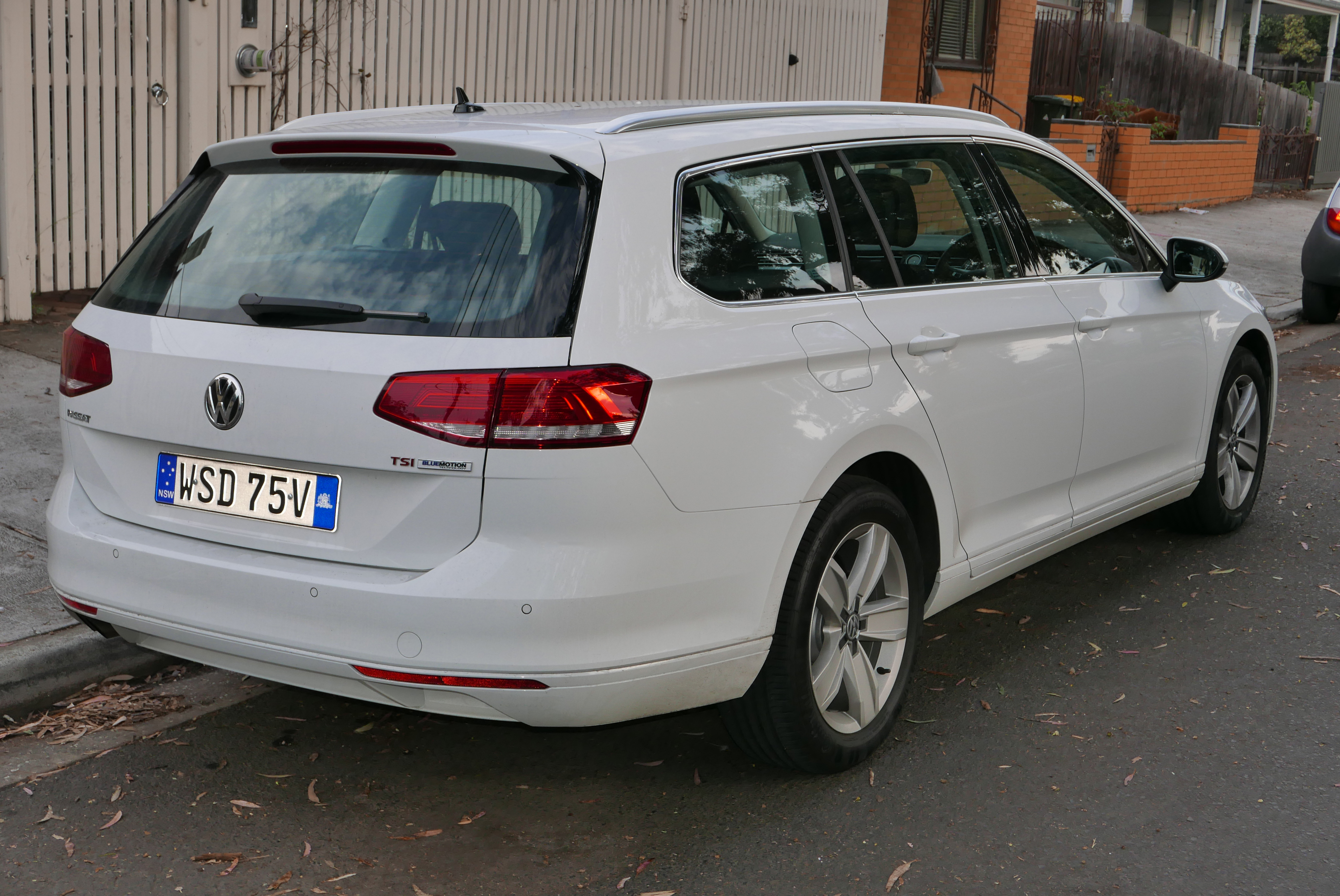

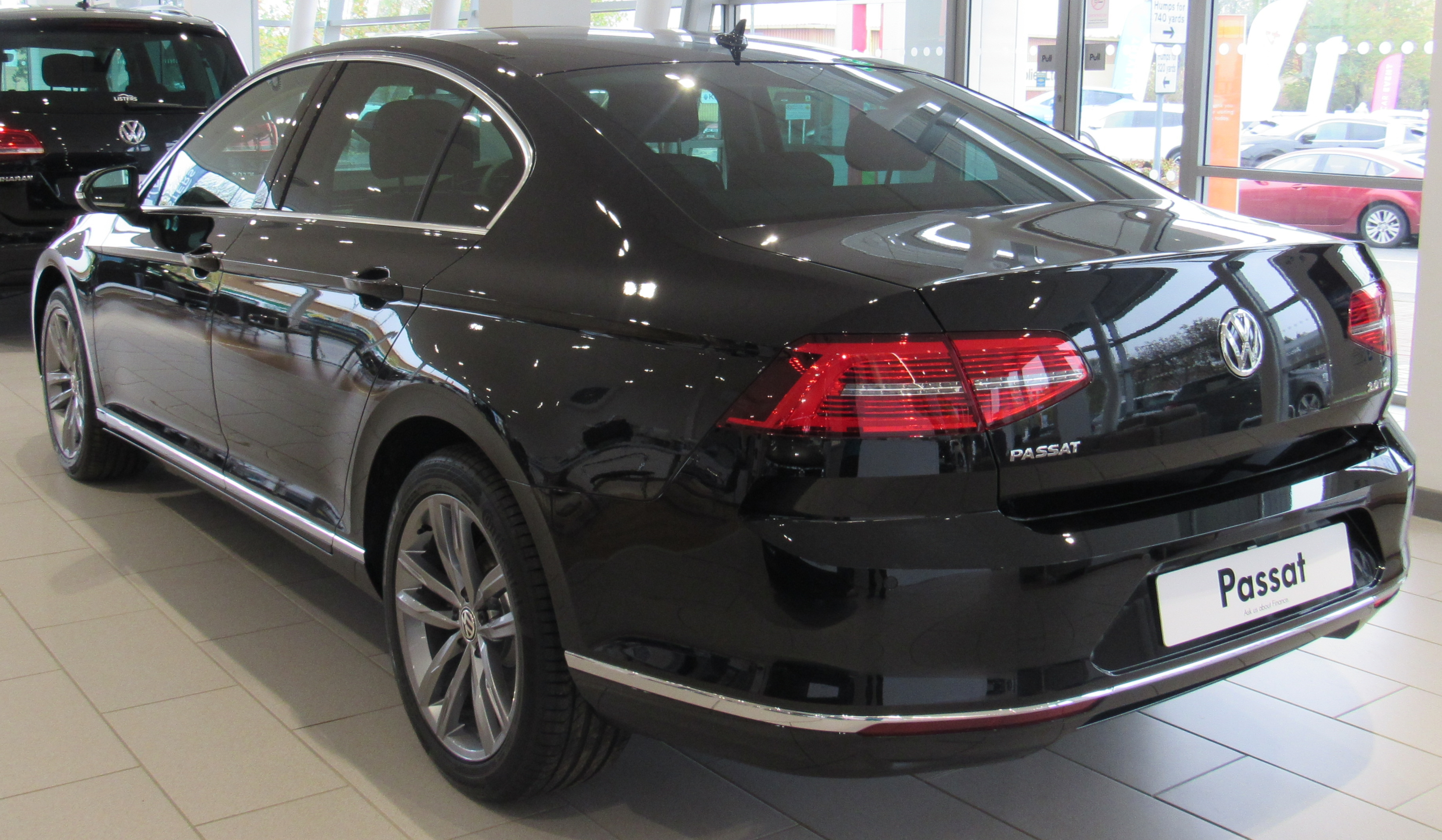

Post-facelift

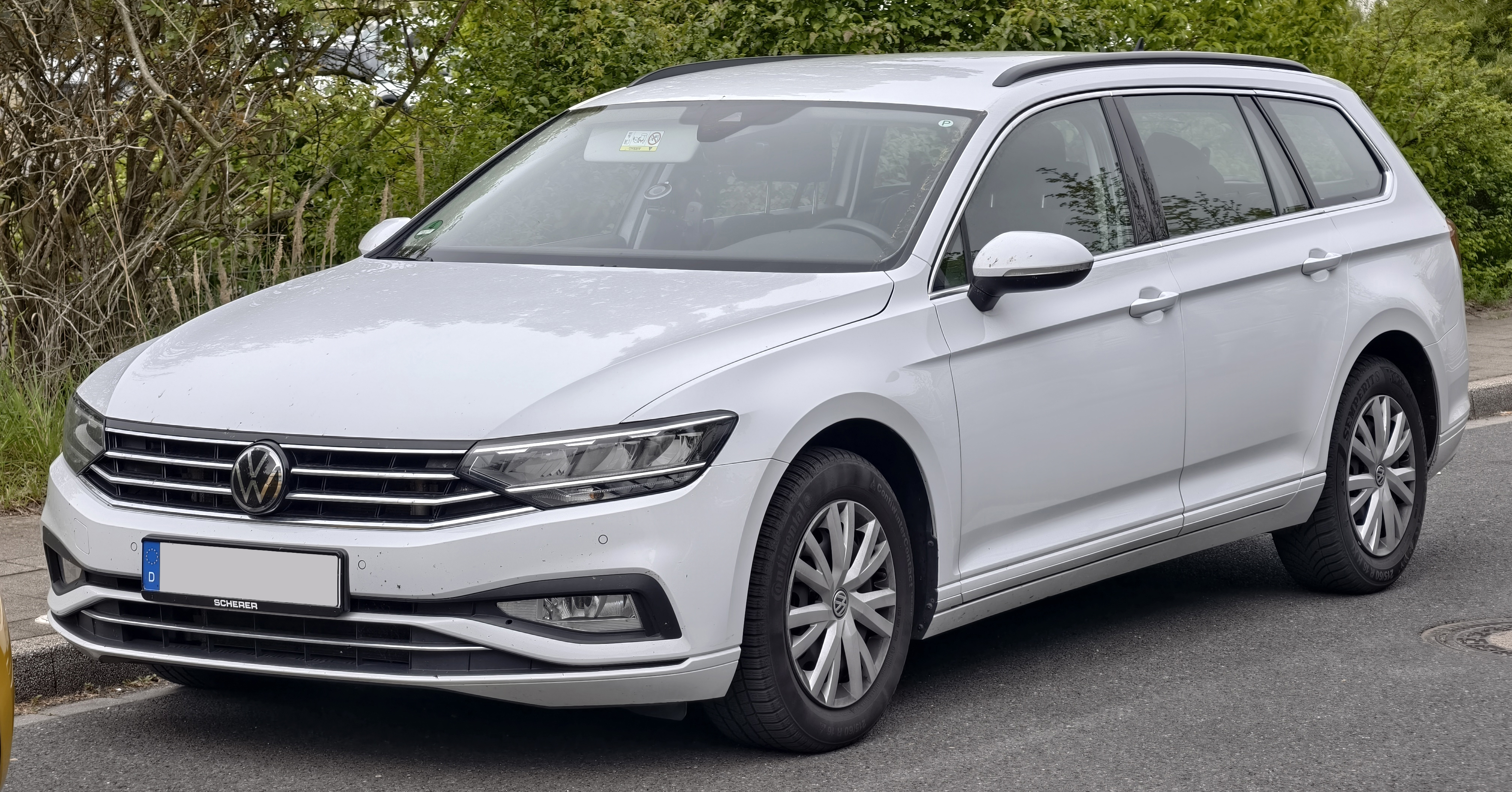

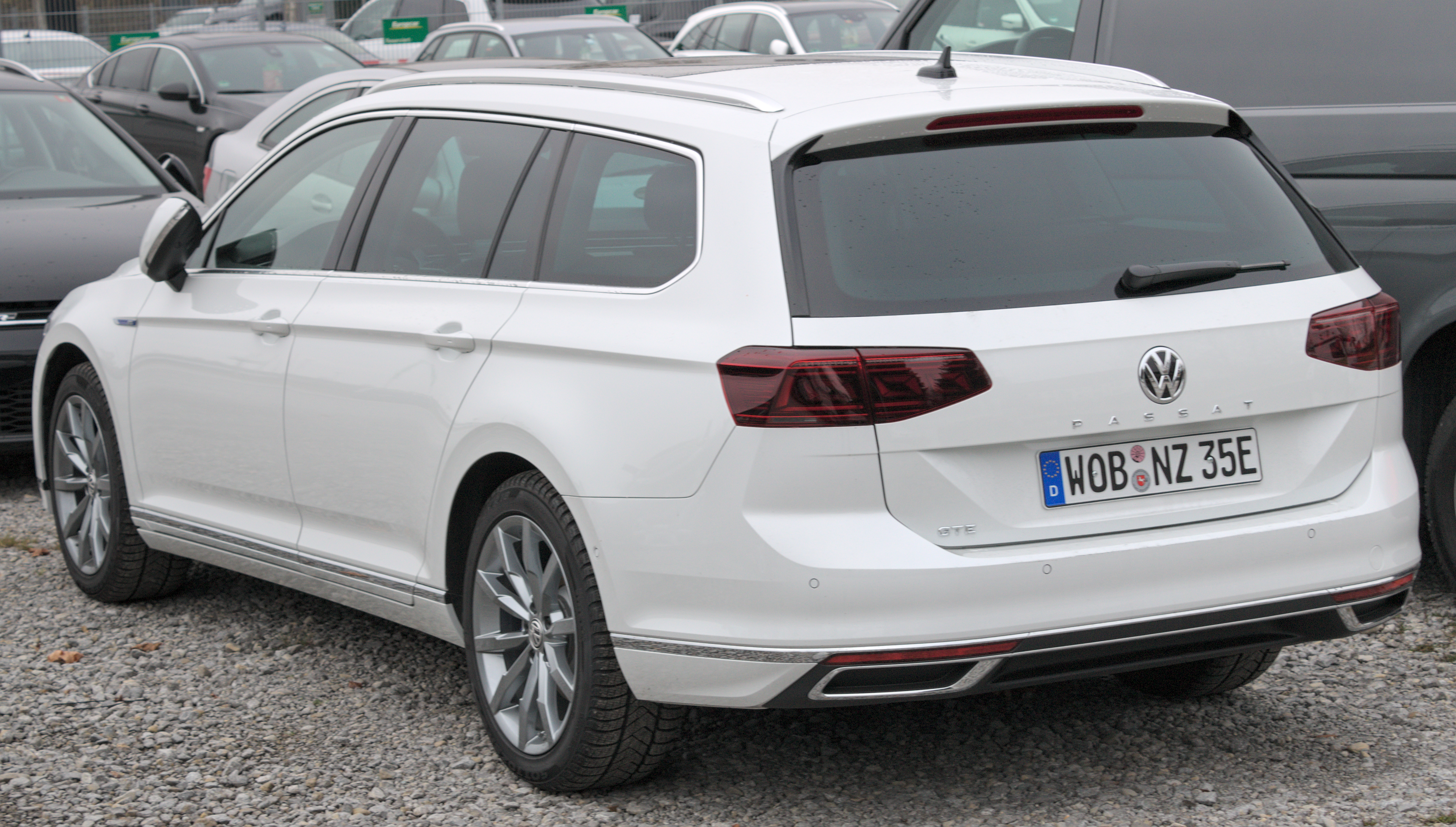

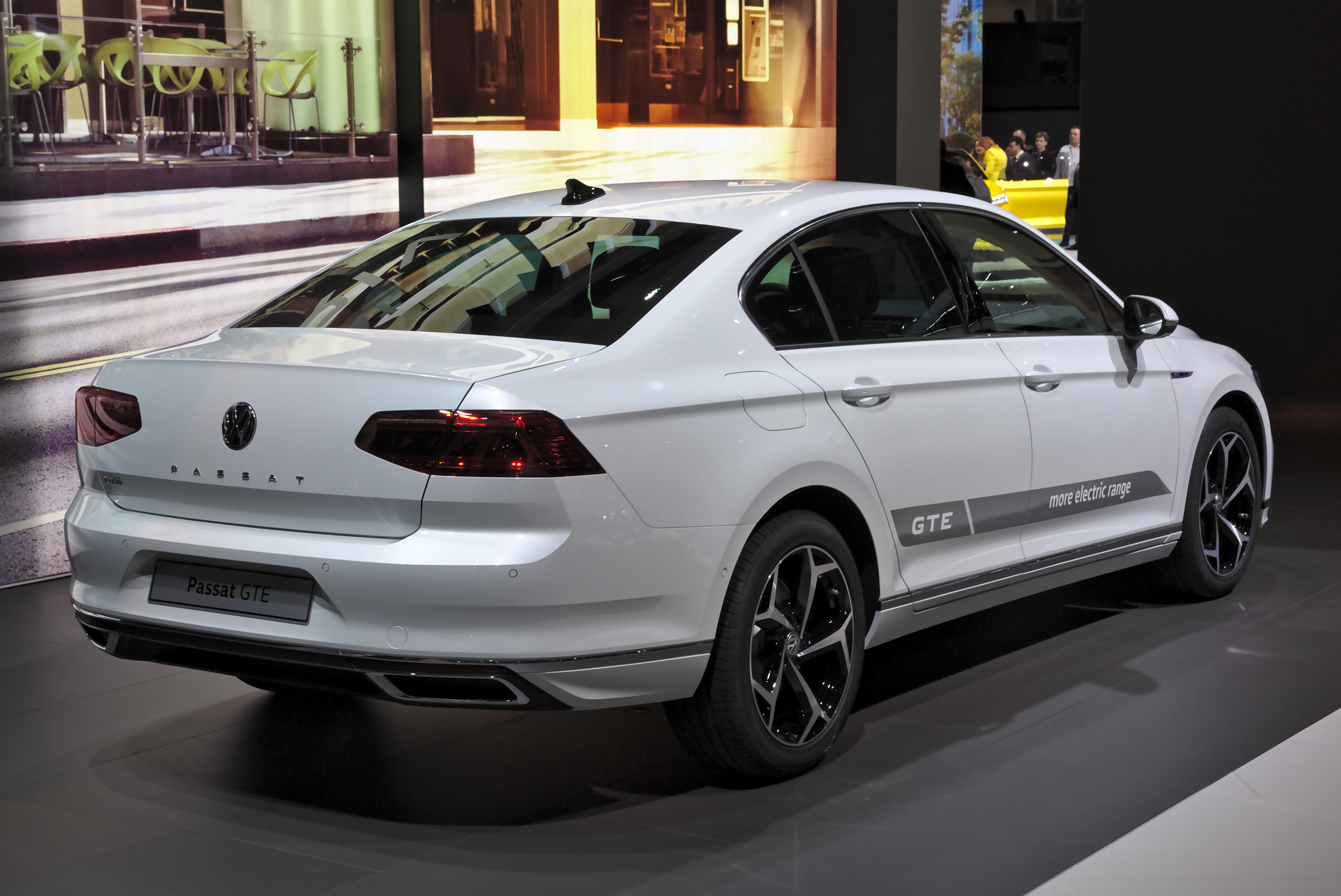

=== Driving assistances ===
The B8 Passat is available with optional assistance systems including "Front Assist", "Pedestrian Detection", "Side Assist", "Emergency Assist", "Traffic Jam Assist" and "Trailer Assist".

==== Front assistance ====
The system uses a long-range radar at the front of the car to detect vehicles up to 80 m ahead which the car is likely to hit unless action is taken. The information from the front radar is relayed to the driver. Up to 30 km/h the system can detect moving and stationary objects and apply full braking power. In moving traffic, between 30 km/h and 323 km/h, the system applies its full capacity of driver warnings, partial braking and brake assistance.

==== Emergency assistance ====
This assistant tries to detect a sleeping/unconscious driver. It will attempt to reactivate the driver after steering feedback has not been detected for a period of time and will also transmit warning signals to its nearby surroundings. If the reactivation has failed, the vehicle will be stopped at a safe location.

==== Traffic congestion assistance ====
The traffic congestion assistance is capable of moving the vehicle in a traffic jam as long as the average speed does not exceed 60 km/h.

==== Trailer assistance ====
The system allows automatic parking with an attached tow trailer.

=== Safety ===
ANCAP test results Volkswagen Passat all Australian variants (2015)
| Test | Score |
|---|---|
| Overall | 5 /5 stars |
| Frontal offset | 14.89/16 |
| Side impact | 16/16 |
| Pole | 2/2 |
| Seat belt reminders | 3/3 |
| Whiplash protection | Good |
| Pedestrian protection | Adequate |
| Electronic stability control | Standard |

ANCAP test results Volkswagen Passat all New Zealand variants (2015)
| Test | Score |
|---|---|
| Overall | 5 /5 stars |
| Frontal offset | 14.89/16 |
| Side impact | 16/16 |
| Pole | 2/2 |
| Seat belt reminders | 3/3 |
| Whiplash protection | Good |
| Pedestrian protection | Adequate |
| Electronic stability control | Standard |

Euro NCAP test results Volkswagen Passat (2015)
| Test | Points | % |
|---|---|---|
| Overall: | 5 /5 stars | |
| Adult occupant: | 33 | 85% |
| Child occupant: | 43 | 87% |
| Pedestrian: | 24 | 66% |
| Safety assist: | 10 | 76% |

== Powertrains ==
The B8 Passat was initially available with two TSI petrol and four TDI diesel powertrains that produce more power than their equivalents from the B7 without changing displacement. The 2.0 TDI engine is available in three configurations, with two being equipped with selective catalytic reduction (SCR) catalysators to reduce the emission of nitrogen oxide.

Every engine with the exception of the SCR-equipped 2.0 TDI engines is mated to a six-speed transmission with an optional six-speed or seven-speed dual-clutch transmission. A 4Motion all-wheel drive drivetrain is available as standard for the strongest SCR TDI and TSI engines and optional for the mid-tier SCR TDI variant.

Every engine is based on 4Motion/BlueMotion Technology and is turbocharged inline-four. In 2015, four additional petrol and two diesel engines became available. In 2015, Passat received two more powerful petrol engines, marketing it as Passat R-Line, which was however shortly thereafter discontinued.

Petrol engines
| Model | Production | Engine | Power | Torque | Top speed | 0–100 km/h (0–62 mph) |
|---|---|---|---|---|---|---|
| 1.4 TSI | 2015–2019 | 1,395 cc (85.1 cu in) | 92 kW; 123 hp (125 PS) | 200 N⋅m (148 lb⋅ft) | 208 km/h (129 mph) | 9.7 s |
| 1.4 TSI ACT | 2015–2019 | 1,395 cc (85.1 cu in) | 110 kW; 148 hp (150 PS) | 184 lb⋅ft (250 N⋅m) | 220 km/h (137 mph) | 8.4 s |
| 1.8 TSI | 2015–2019 | 1,798 cc (109.7 cu in) | 132 kW; 178 hp (180 PS) | 250 N⋅m (184 lb⋅ft) | 232 km/h (144 mph) | 7.9 s |
| 2.0 TSI | 2015–2019 | 1,984 cc (121.1 cu in) | 162 kW; 217 hp (220 PS) | 350 N⋅m (258 lb⋅ft) | 246 km/h (153 mph) | 6.7 s |
| 2.0 TSI 4motion | 2015–2019 | 1,984 cc (121.1 cu in) | 206 kW; 276 hp (280 PS) | 350 N⋅m (258 lb⋅ft) | 250 km/h (155 mph) | 5.8 s |
| 1.5 TSI ACT | 2019–2023 | 1,498 cc (91.4 cu in) | 110 kW; 148 hp (150 PS) | 250 N⋅m (184 lb⋅ft) | 220 km/h (137 mph) | 8.7 s |
| 2.0 TSI | 2019–2023 | 1,984 cc (121.1 cu in) | 140 kW; 187 hp (190 PS) | 320 N⋅m (236 lb⋅ft) | 238 km/h (148 mph) | 7.5 s |
| 2.0 TSI 4motion | 2019–2023 | 1,984 cc (121.1 cu in) | 206 kW; 276 hp (280 PS) | 400 N⋅m (295 lb⋅ft) | 250 km/h (155 mph) | 5.3 s |
Diesel engines
| Model | Years | Engine | Power | Torque | Top speed | 0–100 km/h (0–62 mph) |
| 1.6 TDI | 2015–2023 | 1,598 cc (97.5 cu in) | 88 kW; 118 hp (120 PS) | 250 N⋅m (184 lb⋅ft) | 205 km/h (127 mph) | 11.3 s |
| 2.0 TDI | 2015–2023 | 1,968 cc (120.1 cu in) | 110 kW; 148 hp (150 PS) | 340 N⋅m (251 lb⋅ft) | 223 km/h (139 mph) | 8.9 s |
| 2.0 TDI SCR | 2015–2023 | 1,968 cc (120.1 cu in) | 140 kW; 187 hp (190 PS) | 400 N⋅m (295 lb⋅ft) | 236 km/h (147 mph) | 7.9 s |
| 2.0 TDI SCR 4motion | 2015–2023 | 1,968 cc (120.1 cu in) | 140 kW; 187 hp (190 PS) | 400 N⋅m (295 lb⋅ft) | 231 km/h (144 mph) | 7.7 s |
| 2.0 TDI SCR 4motion | 2015–2023 | 1,968 cc (120.1 cu in) | 177 kW; 237 hp (240 PS) | 500 N⋅m (369 lb⋅ft) | 247 km/h (153 mph) | 6.4 s |

== Passat GTE ==
The plug-in hybrid powertrain of the Passat GTE, previously utilised by the Volkswagen Golf GTE and Audi A3 Sportback e-tron, is featured with a larger battery pack in this model. The GTE has an 85 kW three-phase permanent magnet synchronous electric motor, coupled with a 9.9 kWh lithium-ion battery capable of an all-electric range of 50 km (31 mi) and a total range of 965 km (600 mi). When paired with the 1.4 liter ACT-equipped TSI petrol engine, it will deliver a fuel economy of 2.0 L/100 km (140 mpg_{‑imp}; 120 mpg_{‑US}) equivalent on the New European Driving Cycle, corresponding to CO_{2} emissions lower than 38g/km. Top speed is 219 km/h (136 mph). The trunk size is reduced from 650 liters to 483 liters in the "Variant" stationwagon, compared to non-hybrid Passats, a reduction of 167 liters, due to the battery pack.

In 2020, a facelift was introduced, and the battery pack size increased from 9,9 kWh to 13 kWh. The range has increased to 55 km (34 mi, WLTP) or about 70 km (44 mi, NEDC), compared to the pre-facelift Passat GTE's range of 50 km (31 mi, NEDC). The rear end now has P A S S A T written over the tailgate with large letters, and the interior analog clock has been replaced with a black plastic piece with the hazard lights switch and P A S S A T written on it. The "Battery Charge" function in the infotainment system, which charges the battery using the petrol engine, has been removed. The top speed has been increased to 225 km/h (140 mph).

Hybrid engines
| Model | Production | Engine | Power | Torque | Top Speed | 0-100 km/h(0-62 mph) |
|---|---|---|---|---|---|---|
| 1.4 TSI eHybrid | 2015– | 1,395 cc (85 cu in) | 160 kW; 215 hp (218 PS) | 400 N⋅m (295 lb⋅ft) | 225 km/h (140 mph) | 7.2 s |

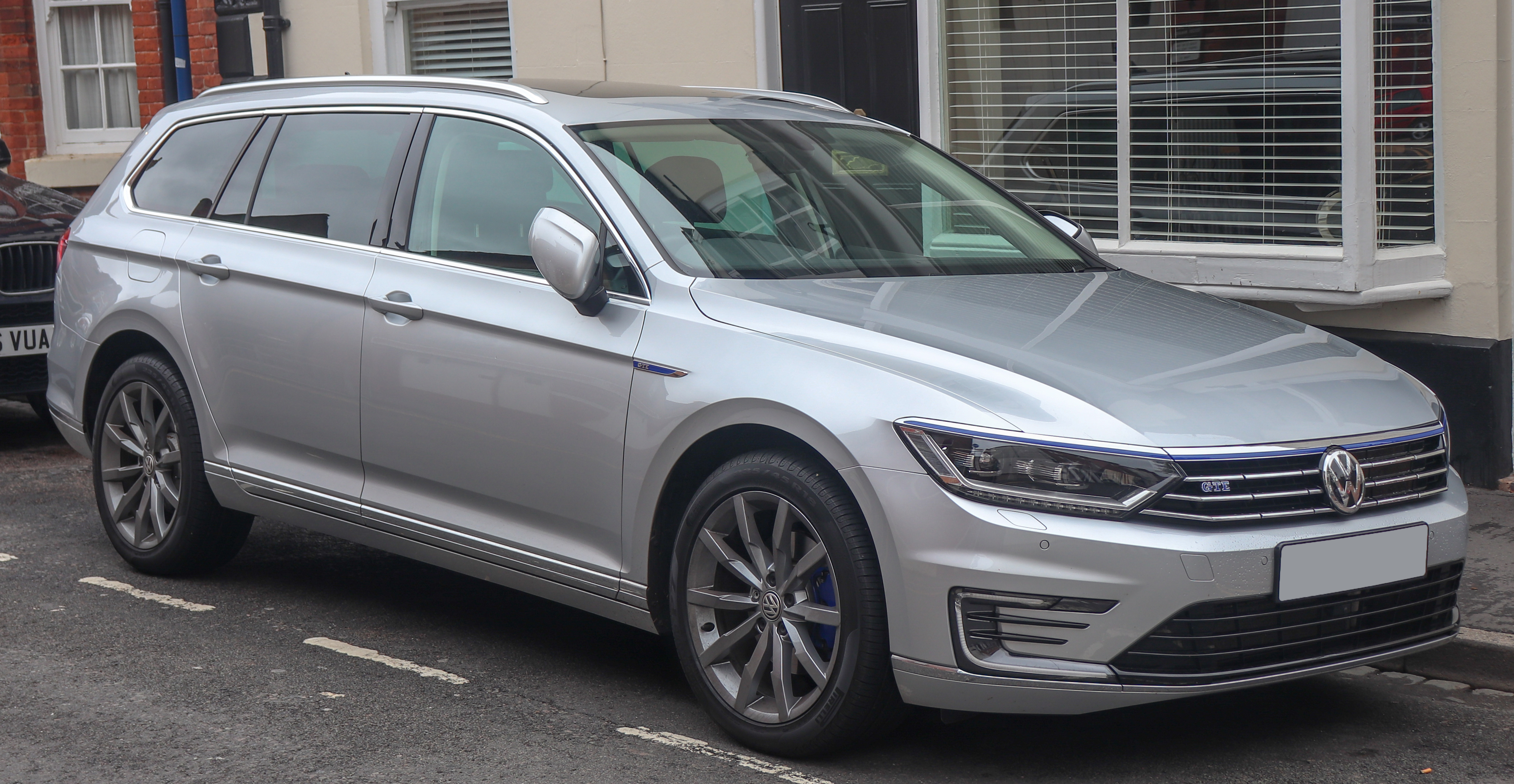
Front (station wagon)

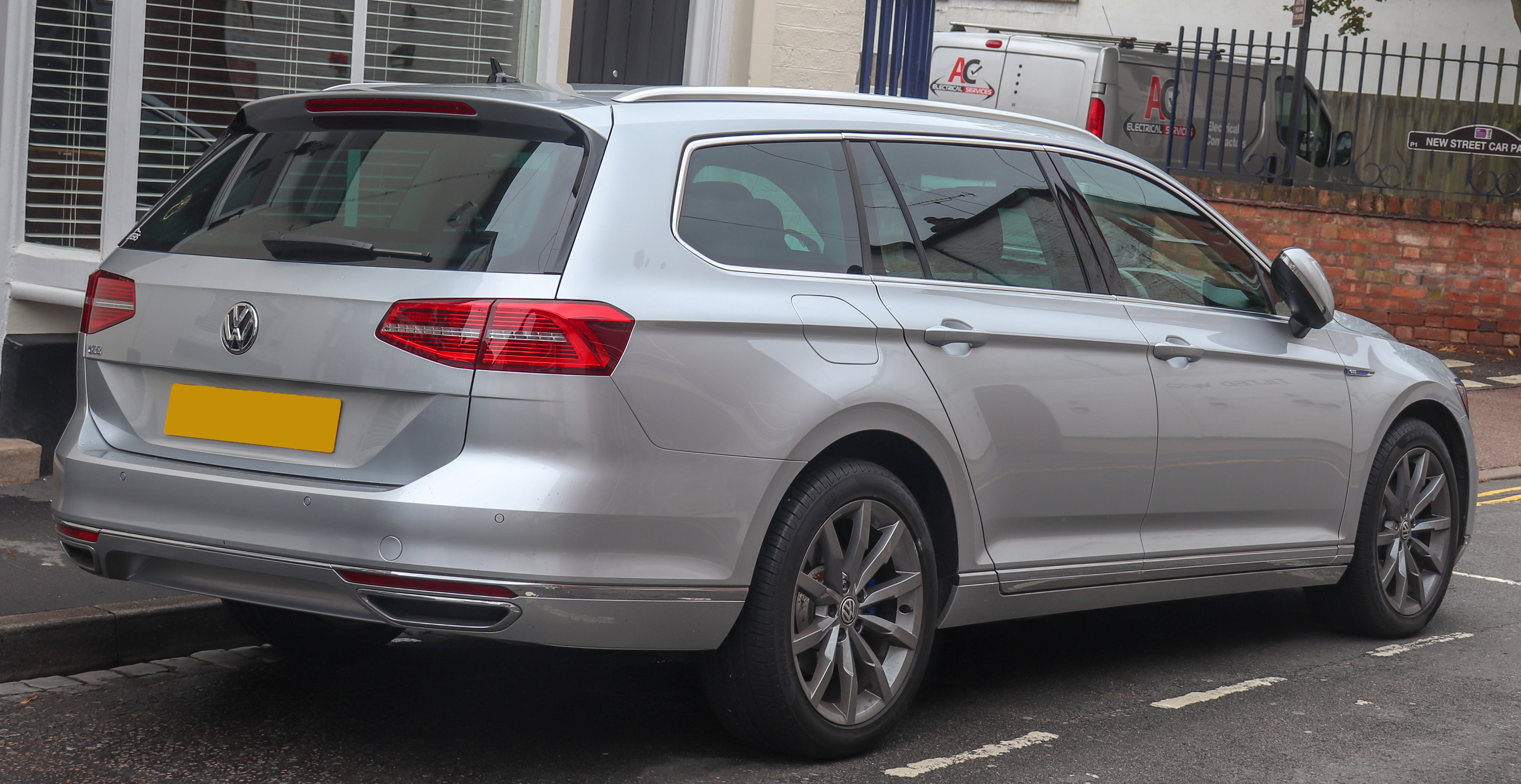
Rear (station wagon)

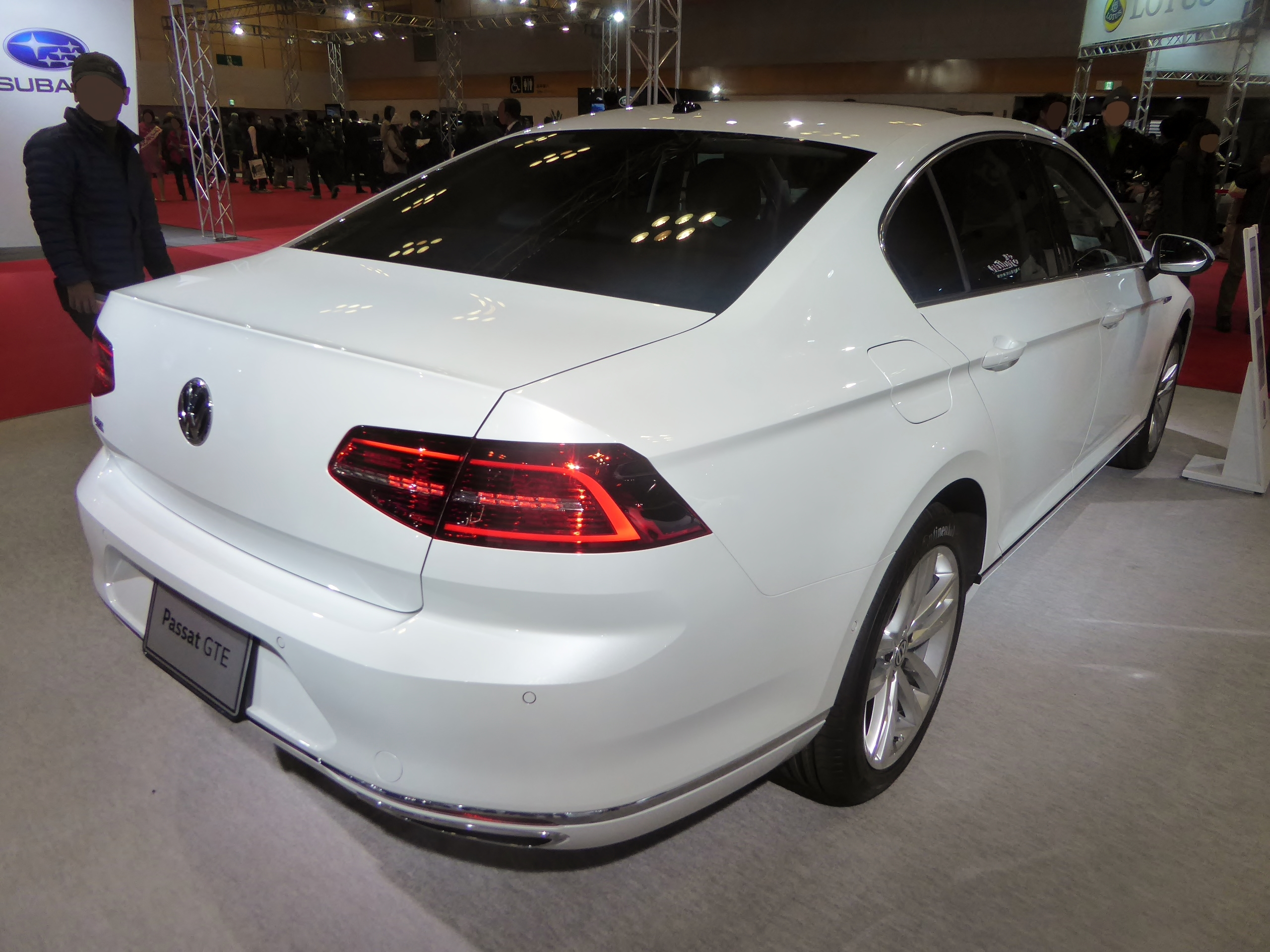
Sedan

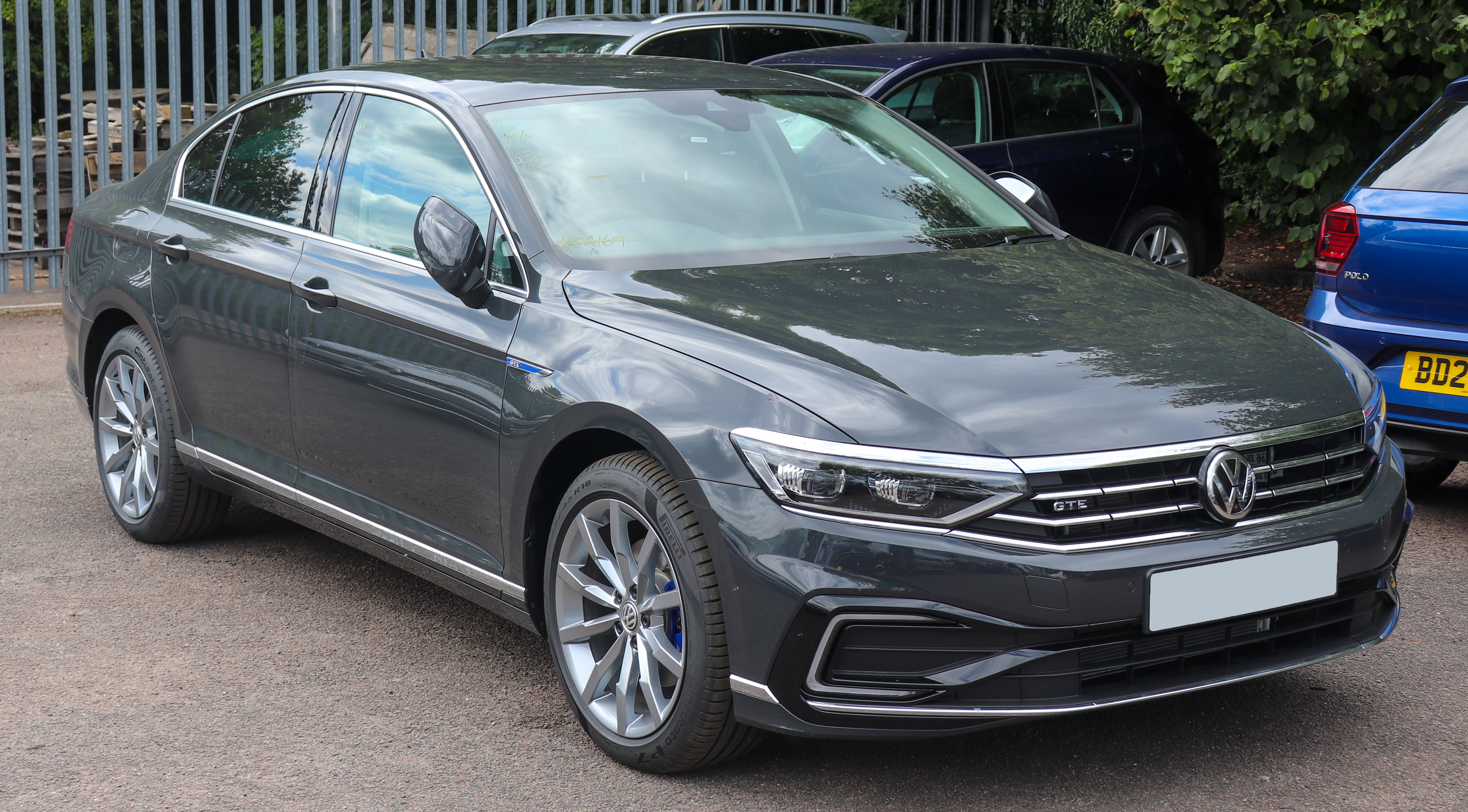
Front (sedan; facelift)

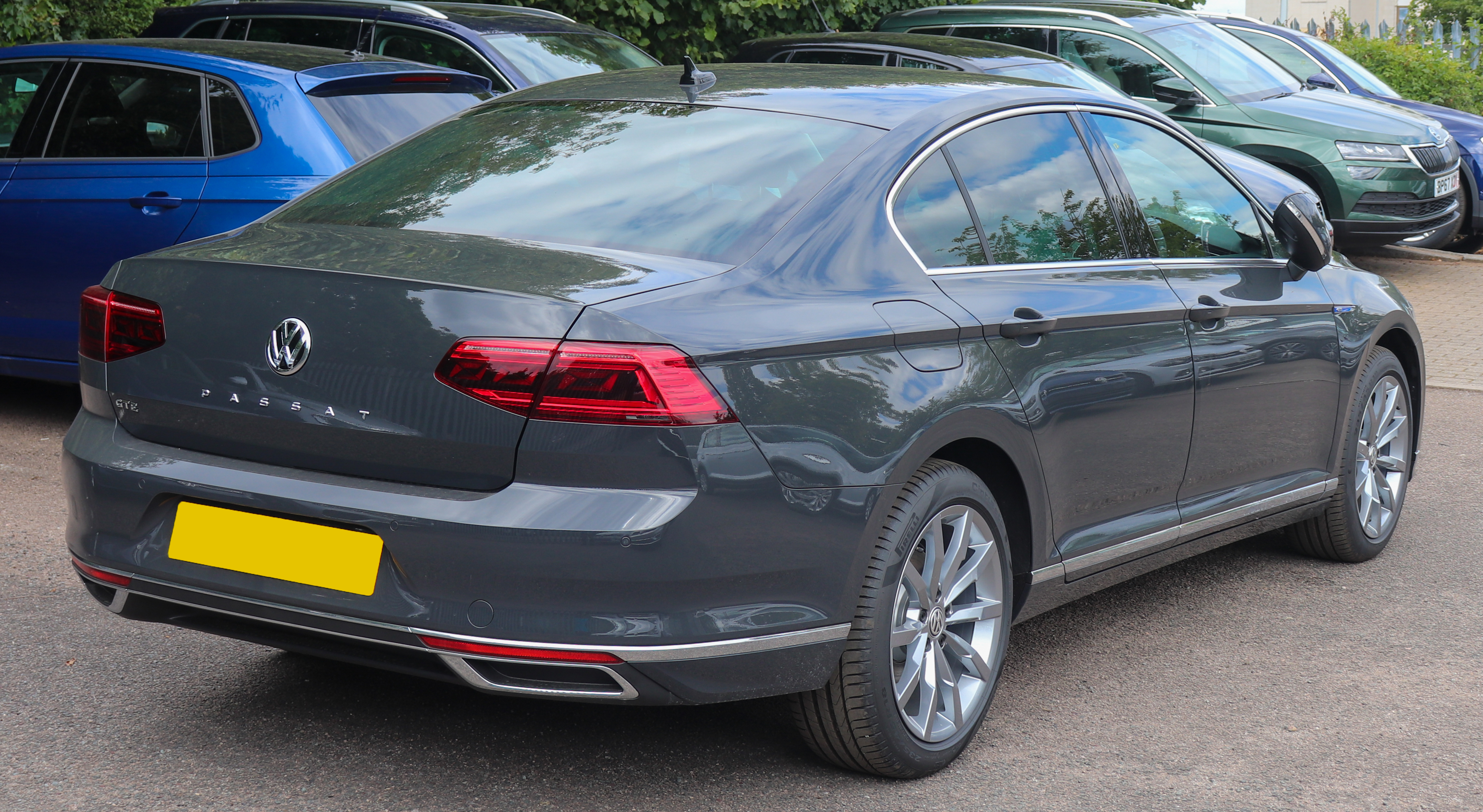
Rear (sedan; facelift)

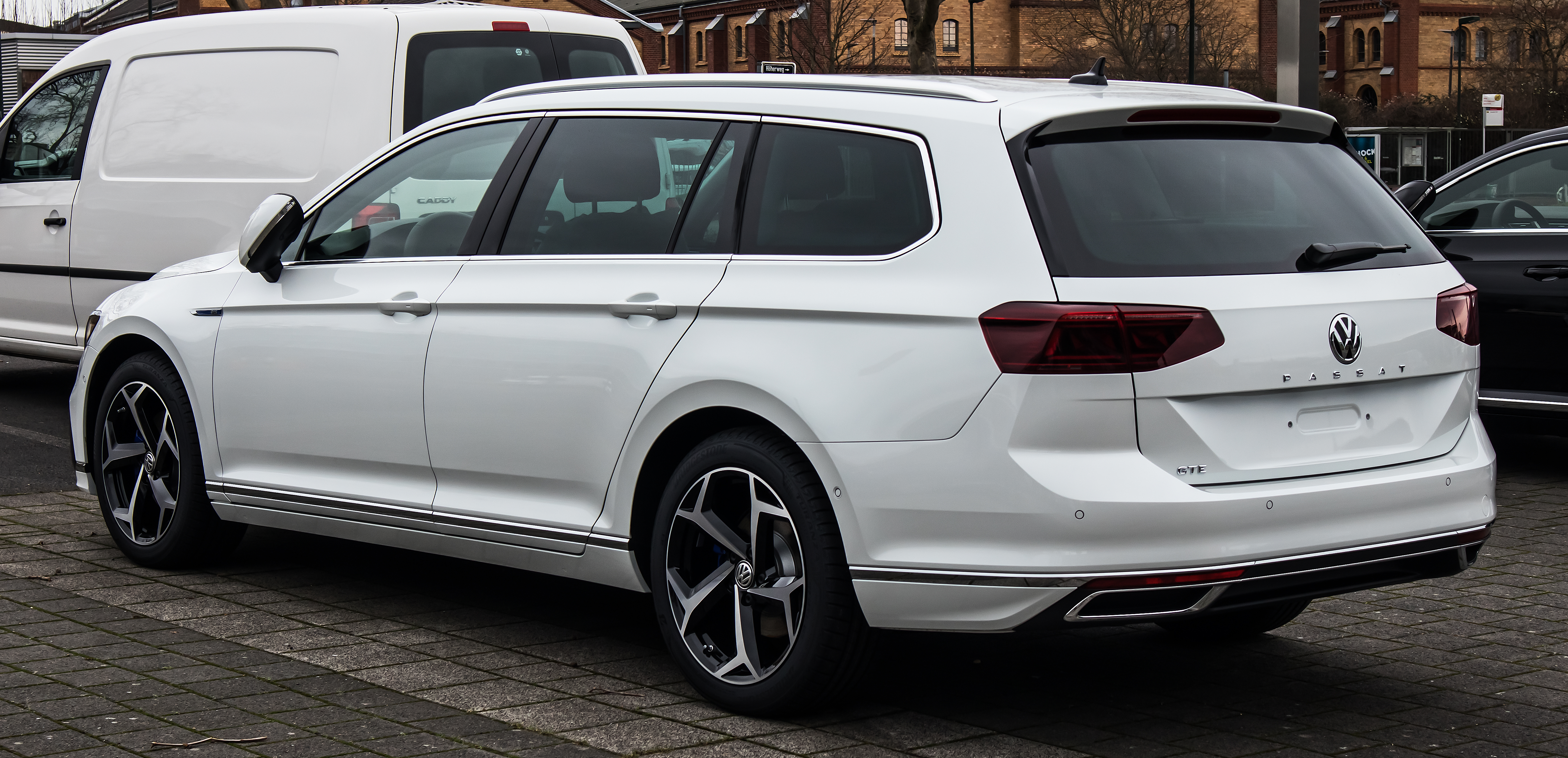
Passat variant (facelift)

=== Sales ===
UK sales began in mid-2015, with deliveries in October 2015. In the Netherlands, pre-orders were opened in early 2015 with deliveries in September 2015.

== Passat Alltrack ==
The Passat Alltrack was introduced in late 2015 for European markets and in early 2016 for Australian and New Zealand markets. The main differences for the Alltrack compared to a normal Passat Estate is 25 mm (0.98 in) of added ground clearance compared to a normal Passat Estate for a total of 174 mm (6.9 in), body cladding, and 4MOTION standard across the range. There are more smaller changes, for example matte chrome wing mirrors, underbody protection, and Alltrack badging in the front, side, and rear. There are also interior changes, mainly adding Alltrack branding. Exclusive to the Alltrack is an off-road mode in the driving mode selector. There is 639 L (23 cu ft) of boot space, 11 less than a normal Passat Estate.

Powertrains consist of one TSI and three TDI engines, carried over from the regular Passat. Only the 110 kW (150 PS) TDI engine is offered with a manual 6-speed gearbox, while all other models come with VW's dual-clutch DSG gearbox. The 4MOTION system used in the Alltrack is a normally front-biased Haldex system.

Petrol engines
| Model | Production | Engine | Power | Torque |
|---|---|---|---|---|
| 2.0 TSI BlueMotion Technology | 2015– | 1,984 cc (121.1 cu in) turbocharged inline-four | 160 kW (220 hp; 220 PS) | 350 N⋅m (258 lb⋅ft) |
Diesel engines
| Model | Years | Engine | Power | Torque |
| 2.0 TDI BlueMotion Technology | 2015– | 1,968 cc (120.1 cu in) turbocharged inline-four | 110 kW (150 hp; 150 PS) | 340 N⋅m (251 lb⋅ft) |
| 2.0 TDI SCR BlueMotion Technology | 2015– | 1,968 cc (120.1 cu in) turbocharged inline-four | 140 kW (190 hp; 190 PS) | 400 N⋅m (295 lb⋅ft) |
| 2.0 TDI SCR BlueMotion Technology | 2015– | 1,968 cc (120.1 cu in) twin-turbocharged inline-four | 180 kW (240 hp; 240 PS) | 500 N⋅m (370 lb⋅ft) |

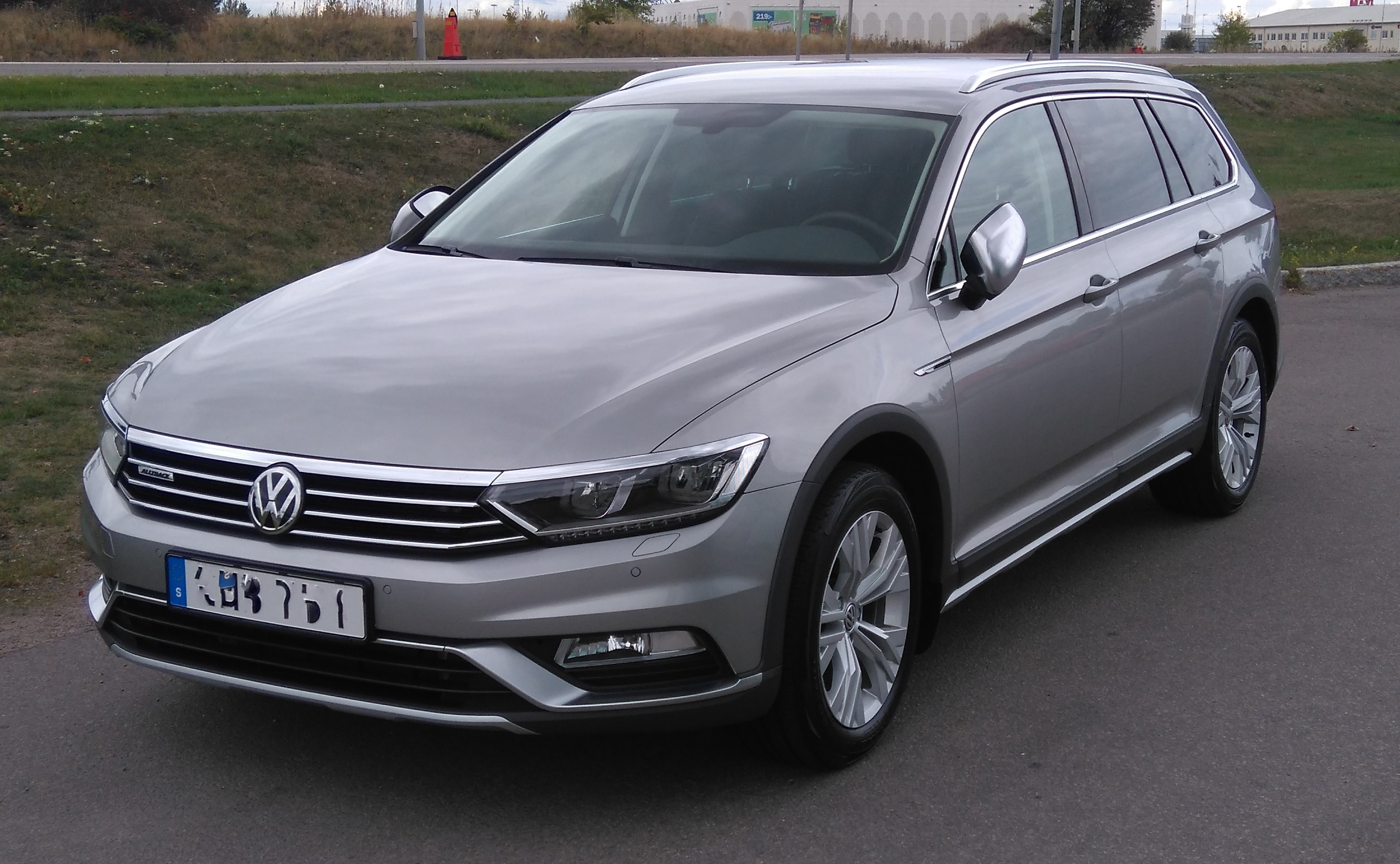
Volkswagen Passat Alltrack

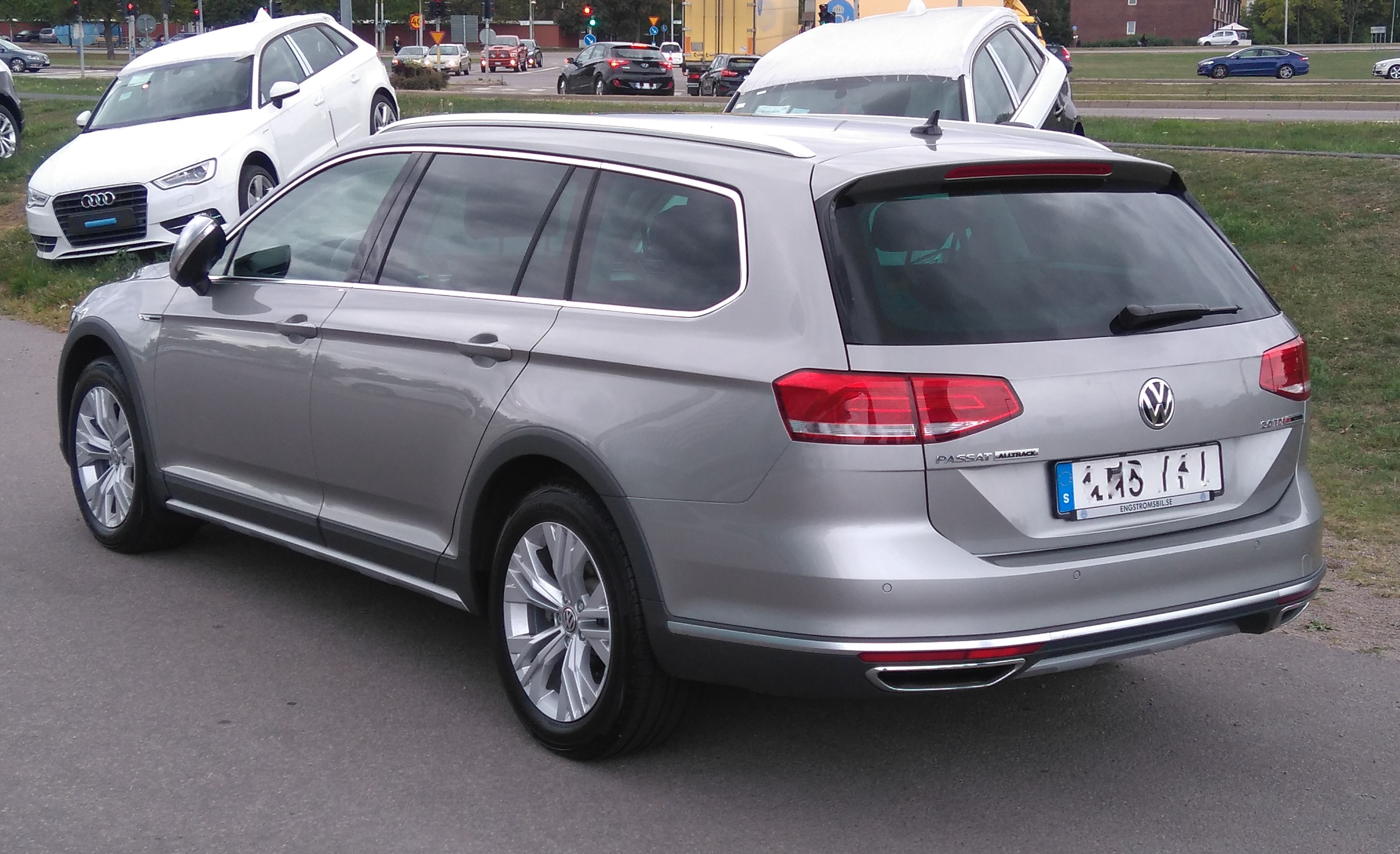
Volkswagen Passat Alltrack

== Saloon discontinuation ==
In December 2021, Volkswagen put the 4-door saloon version of the Passat out of the production line in Europe and withdrew it from price lists when it was announced in January 2022. The estate version sells better in Europe, and that Volkswagen's Arteon liftback is positioned in a similar market segment.

== Reception ==
According to the chairman of the board of Volkswagen, Martin Winterkorn, the B8 is "a premium car without the premium price", indicating that the Passat nameplate was moved to the small car segment, as opposed to the previous generation models that were conceived as large family cars, although some auto journalists have criticised this strategy since it effectively puts the Passat in competition with the Audi A6.
