= Active Fuel Management =

Trademarked variable displacement technology

Active Fuel Management (formerly known as displacement on demand (DoD)) is a trademarked name for the automobile variable displacement technology from General Motors. It allows a V6 or V8 engine to "turn off" half of the cylinders under light-load conditions to improve fuel economy. Estimated performance on EPA tests shows a 5.5–7.5% improvement in fuel economy.

GM's Active Fuel Management technology used a solenoid to deactivate the lifters on selected cylinders of a pushrod V-layout engine.

GM used the Active Fuel Management technology on a range of engines including with the GM Small Block Gen IV engine family, first-generation GM EcoTec3 engine family, second-generation GM High-Feature V6 DOHC engine family, and first-generation High-Feature V8 DOHC engine family. Vehicle applications included the 2005 Chevy TrailBlazer EXT, the GMC Envoy XL, Envoy XUV, and Pontiac Grand Prix.

== Displacement on demand ==
General Motors was the first to modify existing production engines to enable cylinder deactivation, with the introduction of the Cadillac L62 "V8-6-4" in 1981.

== Second generation ==
In 2004, the electronics side was improved greatly with the introductions of Electronic Throttle Control, electronically controlled transmissions, and transient engine and transmission controls. In addition, computing power was vastly increased. A solenoid control valve assembly integrated into the engine valley cover contains solenoid valves that provide a pressurized oil signal to specially designed hydraulic roller lifters provided by Eaton Corp. and Delphi. These lifters disable and re-enable exhaust and intake valve operation to deactivate and reactivate engine cylinders . Unlike the first generation system, only half of the cylinders can be deactivated. It is notable that the second generation system uses engine oil to hydraulically modulate engine valve function. As a result, the system is dependent upon the quality of the oil in the engine. As anti-foaming agents in engine oil are depleted, air may become entrained or dissolve in the oil, delaying the timing of hydraulic control signals. Similarly engine oil viscosity and cleanliness is a factor. Use of the incorrect oil type, i.e. SAE 10W40 instead of SAE 5W30, or the failure to change the engine oil or oil filter at factory recommended intervals, can also significantly impair system performance.

In 2001, GM showcased the 2002 Cadillac Cien concept car, which featured Northstar XV12 engine with Displacement on Demand. Later that year, GM debuted Opel Signum² concept car in Frankfurt Auto Show, which uses the global XV8 engine with displacement on demand. In 2003, GM unveiled the Cadillac Sixteen concept car at the Detroit Opera House, which featured an XV16 concept engine that can switch between 4, 8, and 16 cylinders.

On April 8, 2003, General Motors announced this technology (now called Active Fuel Management) to be commercially available on 2005 GMC Envoy XL, Envoy XUV and Chevrolet TrailBlazer EXT using optional Vortec 5300 V8 engine. GM also extended the technology on the new High Value LZ8 V6 engine in the Chevrolet Impala and Monte Carlo as well as the 5.3L V8 LS4 engine in the last generation Chevrolet Impala SS, Monte Carlo SS and Pontiac Grand Prix GXP. In both designs, half of the cylinders can be switched off under light loads.

On July 21, 2008, General Motors unveiled the production version of the 2010 Chevrolet Camaro. The Camaro SS with an automatic transmission features the GM L99 engine, a development of the LS3 with Active Fuel Management which allowed it to run on four cylinders during light load conditions.

== Third generation ==
In January 2018, GM announced an improved version of AFM called Dynamic Fuel Management to be initially released in Chevy Silverado trucks. This system shuts off any number of cylinders in a variety of combinations, maximizing fuel economy and avoiding switching between banks of cylinders. This is achieved by using oil pressure solenoids to collapse each individual hydraulic valve lifter, allowing for fully independent individual cylinder control. The system is based on Dynamic Skip Fire, a technology developed by California company Tula Technology. The 6.2L V8 engine of the Chevrolet Silverado incorporating the technology was named one of Ward's 10 Best Engines for 2019.

== See also ==
- Variable displacement
- Honda's Variable Cylinder Management (VCM)
- Chrysler's Multi-Displacement System (MDS)
- Daimler AG's Active Cylinder Control (ACC)
- Start-stop system
- Cadillac Variable Displacement V8-6-4 L62 Engine
