= Multi-Displacement System =

Chrysler automobile technology

Chrysler's Multi-Displacement System (MDS) is an automobile engine variable displacement technology. It debuted in 2005 on the 5.7 L modern Hemi V8. Like Mercedes-Benz's Active Cylinder Control, General Motors' Active Fuel Management, and Honda's Variable Cylinder Management, it deactivates four of the V8's cylinders when the throttle is closed or at steady speeds.

The system was first offered only on passenger cars, since the heavy demands of trucks would interfere with its operation. However, it was recalibrated for 2006 and was offered on all seven models, including SUVs and 1500 series trucks, using the 5.7 L engine.

Chrysler expected that the technology would boost economy by 10% to 20%. In the Jeep Grand Cherokee with MDS, highway fuel mileage for the V8 is the same as the V6 at 21 mpg (11.2 liters per 100 km).

In order to preserve the characteristic rumble of the V8 engines, Chrysler and Eberspaecher North America designed a special exhaust system for MDS-equipped vehicles. This includes four separate mufflers, two large central ones for V8 mode and two smaller ones near the tailpipes for four-cylinder mode. Unlike the system used on Mercedes-Benz V12 engines, also designed by Eberspaecher, the system is mechanically passive.

Applications:

- 2005–2023 Chrysler 300C
- 2005–2008 Dodge Magnum
- 2005–present Jeep Grand Cherokee
- 2006–2023 Dodge Charger
- 2006–2009, 2011–present Dodge Durango
- 2006–present Dodge Ram/Ram pickup (1500 only)
- 2006–2010 Jeep Commander
- 2007–2009 Chrysler Aspen
- 2009–2023 Dodge Challenger
- 2021–present Jeep Wrangler Rubicon 392
- 2022–present Jeep Wagoneer

== See also ==
- Daimler AG's Active Cylinder Control (ACC)
- Displacement on Demand
- General Motors' Active Fuel Management (AFM)
- Honda's Variable Cylinder Management (VCM)
- Variable displacement
