= Variable Cylinder Management =

Engine fuel economy system

Variable Cylinder Management (VCM) is Honda's term for its variable displacement technology, which saves fuel by deactivating the rear bank of 3 cylinders during specific driving conditions—for example, highway driving. It was first introduced in the 2003 Honda Inspire sedan. The second version of VCM (VCM-2) took this a step further, allowing the engine to go from 6 cylinders, down to 4 or 3 during cruising and deceleration. This version had an "ECO" indicator light on the dashboard. The most recent version of VCM (VCM-3) reverted to the previous 3- and 6-cylinder operation.

Unlike the pushrod systems used by DaimlerChrysler's Multi-Displacement System and General Motors' Active Fuel Management, Honda's VCM uses overhead cams. A solenoid unlocks the cam followers on one bank from their respective rockers, so the cam follower floats freely while the valve springs keep the valves closed. The system operates through controlling the flow of hydraulic engine oil pressure to locking mechanisms in the cam followers. The engine's drive by wire throttle allows the engine management computer to smooth out the engine's power delivery, making the system nearly imperceptible on some vehicles. When the VCM system disables cylinders, an "ECO" indicator lights on the dashboard, Active Noise Cancellation (ANC) pumps an opposite-phase sound through the audio speakers to reduce cabin noise, and Active Control Engine Mount (ACM) systems reduce vibration.

== Problems ==
The VCM hydraulic circuit control is defaulted open, meaning that the engine has to build up enough oil pressure on initial startup to disable the rear bank of cylinders. A single solenoid on the rear camshaft is activated to close oil pressure to unlock the cam followers, thereby closing the valves. In theory, the closing of all rear bank valves produces an ‘air spring’ effect. However, the reciprocating effect of the piston with closed valves reportedly produces a vacuum condition where oil can get pulled past the piston rings to flood the cylinder. When VCM disengages, the engine then misfires if needing to clear the cylinder of oil. This unique type of oil consumption has led to premature failure of parts like spark plugs, catalytic converters, engine mounts, pistons/rings, and cylinder walls. Newer versions of VCM have been developed to improve system reliability but consumers continue to log complaints.

Owners of vehicles equipped with VCM frequently face vibration problems due to engine motor mount malfunction while ECO mode is enabled. Instead of replacing motor mounts, owners often override the VCM with a bypass mechanism, such as an in-line resistor based temperature override module. This has the effect of the vehicle computer believing that a sufficient engine temperature to enable VCM has not been reached. While this cannot guarantee that VCM will be disabled (e.g. differing climates/load scenarios), it can generally keep VCM from engaging under normal driving conditions. More advanced VCM disabler systems include a variable-resistance potentiometer or a microcontroller to manually or automatically adjust the resistance according to different conditions, which makes it possible to fully disable the VCM system, though at a somewhat higher cost.

== Lawsuit ==
In a 2012 class-action lawsuit, Soto et al v. American Honda Motor Co., Inc., plaintiffs Vince Eagen and Alex Soto alleged that certain Honda vehicles had a systemic design defect that resulted in vehicles burning motor oil at a faster rate than intended, engine misfire symptoms and conditions, and premature spark plug fouling

In 2013, Honda agreed to settle the lawsuit involving 1.6 million vehicles with V-6 engines with VCM technology. The Settlement between Honda and more than 1.87 million consumers included certain Honda vehicles with 6-cylinder engines with Variable Cylinder Management (“VCM-2”) purchased or leased between 2008 and 2013 including the Honda Accord (2008-2012), Honda Odyssey (2008-2013), Honda Pilot (2009-2013), Honda Accord Crosstour (2010-2011), Honda Crosstour (2012). The settlement included a warranty extension for a period of eight years to cover Engine Misfire repairs. In addition, the settlement included full reimbursement to settlement class members who submitted proof of payments for repairs or parts involving diagnostic trouble codes (“DTC”) P0301, P0302, P0303, or P0304.

== Post-Lawsuit ==
Customers continued to experience engine misfires and spark plug fouling on Honda vehicles equipped with VCM sold after the settlement. On June 17, 2025, American Honda announced another warranty extension for certain 2013-2015 Pilot and 2013-2017 Odyssey vehicles.

== Vehicles equipped with VCM ==
- 2003 Honda Inspire (3- and 6-cylinder operation)
- 2004+ Honda Elysion V6
- 2005–2007 Honda Accord Hybrid (JNA1)
- 2005-10 Honda Odyssey (USDM) - EX-L and Touring Models only (J35A7) - 2005-2007 models are equipped with VCM-1 (3- and 6-cylinder operation) - 2008-2010 models are equipped with VCM-2 (3-, 4-, and 6-cylinder operation).
- 2011+ Honda Odyssey (USDM) - 2011-2017 models are equipped with VCM-2 (3-, 4-, and 6-cylinder operation) - 2018+ models are equipped with VCM-3 (3- and 6-cylinder operation).
- 2006–2008 Honda Pilot 2WD Models only (J35Z1) - VCM-1 (3- and 6-cylinder operation)
- 2008–2017 Honda Accord V6 (except EX-L V6 6MT Coupe) - 2008-2012 models are equipped with VCM-2 (3-, 4-, and 6-cylinder operation) - 2013-2017 models are equipped with VCM-3 (3- and 6-cylinder operation).
- 2009+ Honda Pilot (all models) - 2009-2015 models are equipped with VCM-2 (3-, 4-, and 6-cylinder operation) - 2016+ models are equipped with VCM-3 (3- and 6-cylinder operation).
- 2010-2014 Acura TSX (V6)
- 2013-2015 Acura RDX V6 VCM-2, 2016-2018 VCM-3
- 2013 Acura RLX - VCM-3 (3- and 6-cylinder operation)
- 2014 Acura MDX - VCM-3 (3- and 6-cylinder operation)
- 2015 Acura RLX Sport Hybrid - VCM-3 (3- and 6-cylinder operation)
- 2016-2020 Acura TLX V6
- 2017 Honda Ridgeline
- 2026 Honda Passport

== See also ==
- Chrysler's Multi-Displacement System (MDS)
- Daimler AG's Active Cylinder Control (ACC)
- General Motors' Active Fuel Management (AFM)
- Variable displacement
