= Active Cylinder Control =

Daimler AG's Active Cylinder Control (ACC) is a variable displacement technology. It debuted in 2001 on the 5.8 L V12 in the CL600 and S600. Like Chrysler's later Multi-Displacement System, General Motors' Active Fuel Management, and Honda's Variable Cylinder Management, it deactivates one bank of the engine's cylinders when the throttle is closed.

In order to preserve the sound of the engines, DaimlerChrysler worked with Eberspächer to design a special exhaust system for ACC-equipped vehicles. The system uses an active valve to divert exhaust between two different exhaust systems. It also has a variable length intake manifold system to optimize output in the two modes.

== Applications ==
- M138 V12 2001–2002

== See also ==
- Chrysler's Multi-Displacement System (MDS)
- General Motors' Active Fuel Management (AFM)
- Honda's Variable Cylinder Management (VCM)
- Variable displacement
