= Variable displacement =

Combustion engine technology

Variable displacement is an automobile engine technology that allows the engine displacement to change, usually by deactivating cylinders, for improved fuel economy. The technology is primarily used in large multi-cylinder engines. Many automobile manufacturers have adopted this technology as of 2005, although the concept has existed for some time prior to this.

== Theory of operation ==
Cylinder deactivation is used to reduce the fuel consumption and emissions of an internal combustion engine during light-load operation. In typical light-load driving the driver uses only around 30 percent of an engine’s maximum power. In these conditions, the throttle valve is nearly closed, and the engine needs to work to draw air. This causes an inefficiency known as pumping loss. Some large capacity engines need to be throttled so much at light load that the cylinder pressure at top dead centre is approximately half that of a small four-cylinder engine. Low cylinder pressure results in lower fuel efficiency. The use of cylinder deactivation at light load means there are fewer cylinders drawing air from the intake manifold, which works to increase its fluid (air) pressure. Operation without variable displacement is wasteful because fuel is continuously pumped into each cylinder and combusted even though maximum performance is not required. By shutting down half of an engine's cylinders, the amount of fuel being consumed is much less. Between reducing the pumping losses, which increases pressure in each operating cylinder, and decreasing the amount of fuel being pumped into the cylinders, fuel consumption can be reduced by 8 to 25 percent in highway conditions.

Cylinder deactivation is achieved by keeping the intake and exhaust valves closed for a particular cylinder. By keeping the intake and exhaust valves closed, it creates an "air spring" in the combustion chamber – the trapped exhaust gases (kept from the previous charge burn) are compressed during the piston’s upstroke and push down on the piston during its downstroke. The compression and decompression of the trapped exhaust gases have an equalising effect – overall, there is virtually no extra load on the engine. In the latest breed of cylinder deactivation systems, the engine management system is also used to cut fuel delivery to the disabled cylinders. The transition between normal engine operation and cylinder deactivation is also smoothed, using changes in ignition timing, cam timing and throttle position (due to electronic throttle control). In most instances, cylinder deactivation is applied to relatively large displacement engines that are particularly inefficient at light load. In the case of a V12, up to six cylinders can be disabled.

Two issues to overcome with all variable-displacement engines are unbalanced cooling and vibration.

== History ==
The oldest engine technological predecessor for the variable-displacement engine is the hit-and-miss engine, developed in the late 19th century. These single-cylinder stationary engines had a centrifugal governor that cut the cylinder out of operation so long as the engine was operating above a set speed, typically by holding the exhaust valve open.

=== Cadillac L62 V8-6-4 ===
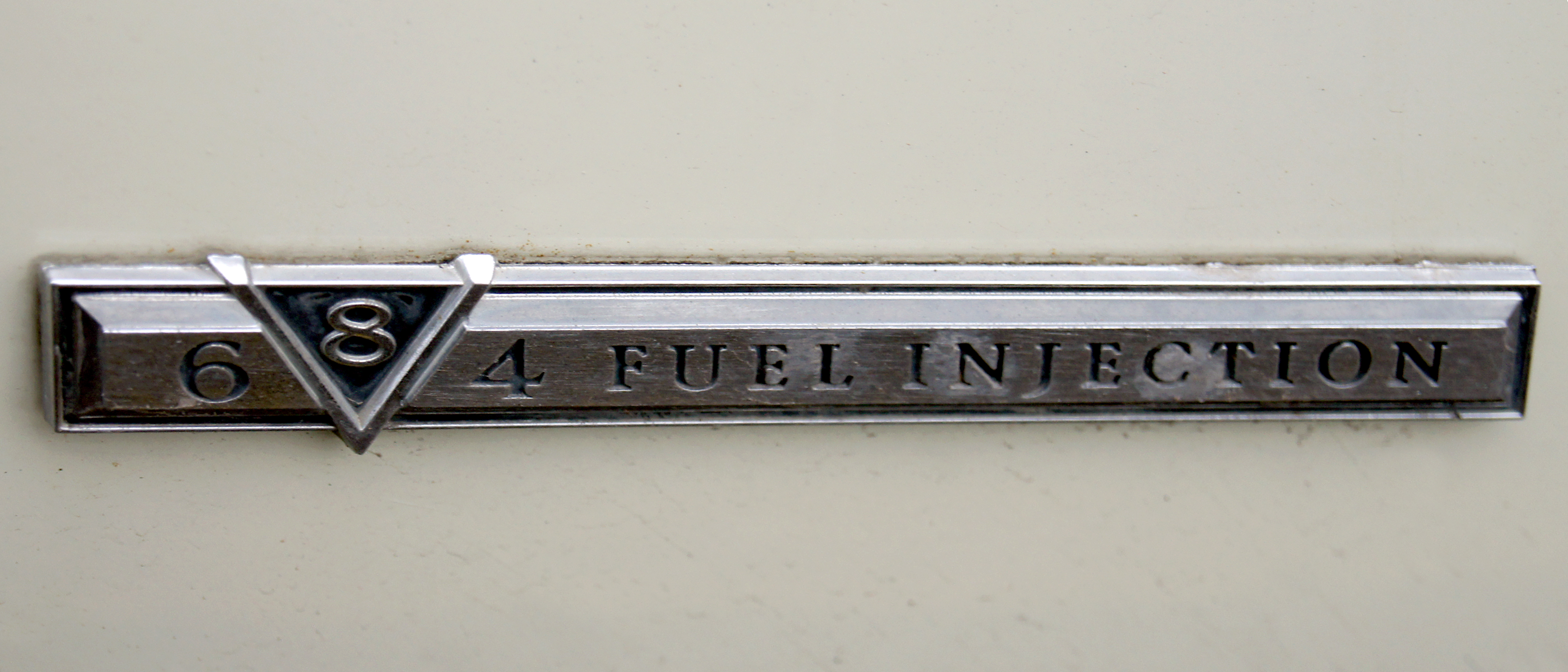
Cadillac V8-6-4 emblem

First experiments with multiple-cylinder engines during WWII, were re-attempted in 1981 on Cadillac's ill-fated L62 "V8-6-4" engine. The technology was made a standard feature on all Cadillac models except Seville, which had the 350 diesel V-8 engine as a base engine. Cadillac, in conjunction with Eaton Corporation, developed the innovative V-8-6-4 system which used the industry's first engine control unit to switch the engine from eight- to six- to four-cylinder operation depending on the amount of power needed. The original multi-displacement system turned off opposite pairs of cylinders, allowing the engine to have three different configurations and displacements. The cars had an elaborate diagnostics procedure, including showing engine trouble codes on the air conditioning display. However, the system was troublesome, misunderstood by customers, and a rash of unpredictable failures led to the technology being quickly retired.

=== Alfa Romeo Alfetta CEM ===
In 1981 Alfa Romeo developed in collaboration with the University of Genoa a semi-experimental variable displacement engine version of the Alfa Romeo Alfetta, called Alfetta CEM (Controllo Elettronico del Motore, or Electronic Engine Management), and showed it at the Frankfurt Motor Show. The 130 PS (96 kW; 128 bhp) 2.0-litre modular engine featured fuel injection and ignition systems governed by an engine control unit, which could shut off two of four cylinders as needed in order to reduce fuel consumption. An initial batch of 10 examples were assigned to taxi drivers in Milan, to verify operation and performance in real-world situations. According to Alfa Romeo during these tests cylinder deactivation was found to reduce fuel consumption by 12% in comparison to a CEM fuel-injected engine without variable displacement, and almost by 25% in comparison to the regular production carburetted 2.0-litre. After the first trial, in 1983 a small series of 1000 examples was put on sale, offered to selected clients; 991 examples were produced. Despite this second experimental phase, the project had no further developments.

=== Mitsubishi MD ===
In 1982 Mitsubishi developed its own variable displacement in the form of MD (Modulated Displacement) which proved that the technology, first used in Mitsubishi's 1.4 L 4G12 straight-four engine, can function successfully. Because Cadillac's system proved to be a failure and a four-cylinder engine was used, Mitsubishi hailed their own as a world first. The technology was later used in Mitsubishi's V6 engines.

The system worked by disabling the valves on cylinders number 1 and 4 at speeds below 70 km/h (43.5 mph), at idling, and while decelerating. Fuel consumption figures were generally about 20 percent improved over the regular 4G12 engine. Period sources, however, complained about the engine running very roughly while in two-cylinder mode, despite special engine mounts with hydraulic damping. Other efforts taken to minimize vibrations and harshness included a section of flexible exhaust pipe, not operating the system until the coolant temperature reached 70C, and a 70 percent heavier flywheel. Mitsubishi's effort remained short-lived, mainly because of a lack of response from car buyers.

In 1993, a year after Mitsubishi developed its own variable valve timing technology, the MIVEC-MD variant was introduced. The revived MD technology was now in its second generation with improved electronic engine controls enabling the switch from 4 to 2 cylinders to be made almost imperceptibly. In MD mode, the MIVEC engine utilizes only two of its four cylinders, which reduces significantly the energy wasted due to pumping losses. In addition, power loss due to engine friction is also reduced. Depending on conditions, the MIVEC-MD system can reduce fuel consumption by 10–20 percent; although some of this gain is from the variable valve timing system, not from the variable-displacement feature. Modulated Displacement was dropped around 1996.

=== Aftermarket systems ===
A number of companies have developed aftermarket cylinder deactivation systems, with varying degrees of success. The 1979 EPA evaluation of the Automotive Cylinder Deactivation System (ACDS), which allowed eight-cylinder engines to be run on four cylinders, found that carbon monoxide and nitrogen oxide emissions were increased beyond the legal limits of the emission standards then in force. While fuel economy was increased, acceleration was seriously compromised, and the loss of engine vacuum led to a dangerous loss of braking assist when the system was in four-cylinder mode. In addition to these issues, while the company proposed a hydraulically controlled system that could be switched from within the car, the version they implemented had to be manually changed in the engine compartment using hand tools.

== Present ==
There are currently two main types of cylinder deactivation mechanizations used today, depending on the type of the engine's valvetrain. The first is for pushrod designs which uses solenoids to alter oil pressure delivered to lock pins in the lifters. With lock pin out of place, the lifters are collapsed and unable to elevate their companion pushrods under the valve rocker arms, resulting in valves that remain closed when the cam pushes on the part in lost motion.

The second type is for overhead cam engines, and uses a pair of locked-together rocker arms that are employed for each valve. One rocker follows the cam profile, while the other actuates the valve. When a cylinder is deactivated, solenoid-controlled oil pressure releases a locking pin between the two rocker arms. While one arm still follows the camshaft, the unlocked arm remains motionless and doesn't move the valve. With computer control, fast cylinder deactivation and reactivation occur almost instantly.

Several automotive manufacturers have engines with cylinder deactivation in current production.

Daimler AG's Active Cylinder Control (ACC) variable displacement technology debuted in 2001 on the 5.8 L V12 in the CL600 and S600.

Mercedes-Benz developed their Multi-Displacement System V12 in the late 1990s, which shuts off every other cylinder in the firing order. It was widely deployed on pushrod V8 engines starting with the 2004 DaimlerChrysler Hemi.

Starting in 2003, Honda introduced Variable Cylinder Management on the J family engines. Honda's system works by deactivating banks of cylinders, switching from six to four to three cylinders.

In 2005, GM introduced their Active Fuel Management cylinder deactivation system (in the Generation IV small-block) which, similar to Chrysler's MDS, switched off half of the cylinders. In 2018 GM introduced an improved system called Dynamic Fuel Management that shuts off any number of cylinders, in a variety of combinations, depending on immediate needs. The system is based on Dynamic Skip Fire, a technology developed by California company Tula Technology and the 6.2L engine incorporating it was named one of Ward's 10 Best Engines for 2019.

In 2012 Volkswagen introduced Active Cylinder Technology (ACT), the first manufacturer to do so in four-cylinder engines.

In 2015 Alfa Romeo implemented cylinder bank deactivation in the Giulia and Stelvio Quadrifoglio V6 engine, allowing it to operate as an inline-three under light loads.

In November 2016 Ford announced its compact three-cylinder Ecoboost engine with deactivation on one of the cylinders. This is the smallest engine so far to use deactivation, and will allow the benefits to be applied in small cars.

In November 2017, Mazda announced standard cylinder deactivation in all 2018 CX-5 models, and availability on Mazda6 models.

As of the 2020 model year, about 15% of light-duty vehicles sold in the United States used cylinder deactivation, predominantly used by Mazda (64%), GM (44%), Honda (24%), and FCA (23%).

== Related technologies ==
Variable compression ratio. The best known such system was the experimental Saab Variable Compression engine, which used a hinged block to move the pistons closer to or further from the head, thus changing the size of the combustion chambers. Other experimental systems include the Hefley engine, which uses a sliding crank race on an eccentric shaft, and the Scalzo Piston Deactivation Engine, which uses a four-bar linkage, and has the distinction of being able to stop individual pistons entirely. There are currently no production vehicles that use any of these designs.

Additionally, some engines such as Cadillac's Northstar engine series and Ford's Modular and Duratec engines feature a fail-safe mode where if the engine overheats or loses coolant, the engine controller would cut fuel and spark to half of the cylinders. With valve operation left unaltered, the noncombustive cylinders would air-cool the engine.

== Variable-displacement technologies ==
- Bentley unveiled an updated L-Series engine in 2015 with variable displacement
- DaimlerChrysler Multi-Displacement System (MDS) was used in Chrysler models
- DaimlerChrysler Active Cylinder Control (ACC) was used in Mercedes-Benz models
- General Motors V8-6-4 (Cadillac)
- General Motors Cadillac Sixteen (Cadillac)
- General Motors Active Fuel Management
- Honda Variable Cylinder Management (VCM)
- Mazda Skyactiv-G 2.5 engines manufactured from 2018 on feature cylinder deactivation.

== See also ==
- Camless engine
- Saab Variable Compression engine
- Start-stop system
