= North American International Auto Show =

Annual auto show in Detroit, Michigan

Coordinates: 42°19′34″N 83°2′49″W

Detroit Auto Show
- Genre: Auto show
- Venue: Huntington Place
- Location: Detroit, Michigan
- Country: United States
- Inaugurated: 1907
- Previous event: January 14–25, 2026
- Next event: January 12–24, 2027
- Organiser: Detroit Auto Dealers Association
- Website: detroitautoshow.com

The Detroit Auto Show, formerly known as the North American International Auto Show (NAIAS), is an annual auto show held in Detroit, Michigan. Hosted at Huntington Place (formerly Cobo Center) since 1965, it is among the largest auto shows in North America, and is widely regarded as one of the automotive industry's most important events.

The show is organized by the Detroit Auto Dealers Association (DADA), and has been held annually in January for much of its recent history. It is usually open to the general public for 1–2 weeks, preceded by previews for industry employees and media, and a black-tie "charity preview" fundraiser for local children's charities.

== History ==
In 1899, William E. Metzger helped organize the Detroit Auto Show, only the second of its kind, after the 1898 Paris Auto Show. An auto show was held in Detroit in 1907 at Beller's Beer Garden at Riverside Park and since then annually except 1941–1953. During the show's first decades of existence it portrayed only a regional focus. In 1957 international carmakers exhibited for the first time.

In 1987, the DADA proposed that the show become international. The members of the DADA went to places such as Europe and Japan in the attempt to convince those unveiling their new brands or vehicles in those countries to bring those unveilings to the North American Auto Show. That attempt proved to be successful; the North American Auto Show was then renamed the North American International Auto Show in 1989. The NAIAS was the first (and, until 2006, only) auto show in the United States sanctioned by the OICA.

Since 1965, the show has been held at Huntington Place (formerly Cobo Center), where it occupies nearly 1 million square feet (93,000 m^{2}) of floor space. Prior to being held at Huntington Place, the show was held at other well-known places in the Metro Detroit area, including the Light Guard Armory, Wayne Gardens pavilion, and Michigan State Fairgrounds.

Record attendance was in 2003, with 838,066 attendees. In 2009, attendance was 650,517. In 2016, there were 815,575 in ticketed attendance, after reaching 803,451 in 2015. In 2004 and 2005, the charity preview attracted 17,500 people at $400 a ticket and raised $7 million in total. Over 800,000 attended during the days the show was open to the general public in 2018; it is estimated that the show generates a revenue of over $500 million to the local economy.

Audi, BMW and Mercedes-Benz were not present at the 2019 edition, following recent absences of other luxury manufacturers like Porsche, Jaguar, Land Rover and Volvo.

In 2018, plans were made to move the show from January to June beginning in 2020, in hopes of attracting more visitors and adding outdoor events, with plans for an "auto plaza" around Woodward and Jefferson avenues, in addition to the indoor exhibition at TCF Center. An outdoor festival known as "Motor Bella" was to precede the show, which would showcase European supercars. The 2020 edition was cancelled due to the COVID-19 pandemic, during which TCF Center was used as a field hospital by FEMA.

In 2020, plans were made to move the 2021 show from June to late September due to the continued pandemic. However, the 2021 edition was also canceled. The NAIAS organizers held Motor Bella at the M1 Concourse in Pontiac, Michigan as a partial replacement, which was an outdoor enthusiast event running from September 21–26. Executive director Rod Alberts stated that "we cannot ignore the major disruptions caused by the pandemic and the impact it has had on budgets. As such, we will be providing an amazing experience to the media, the auto industry and the public in a cost-effective way."

For the 2022 and 2023 editions, the show returned to downtown Detroit and was held in September. With the 2025 edition, the show returned to January, and was rebranded again as the Detroit Auto Show.

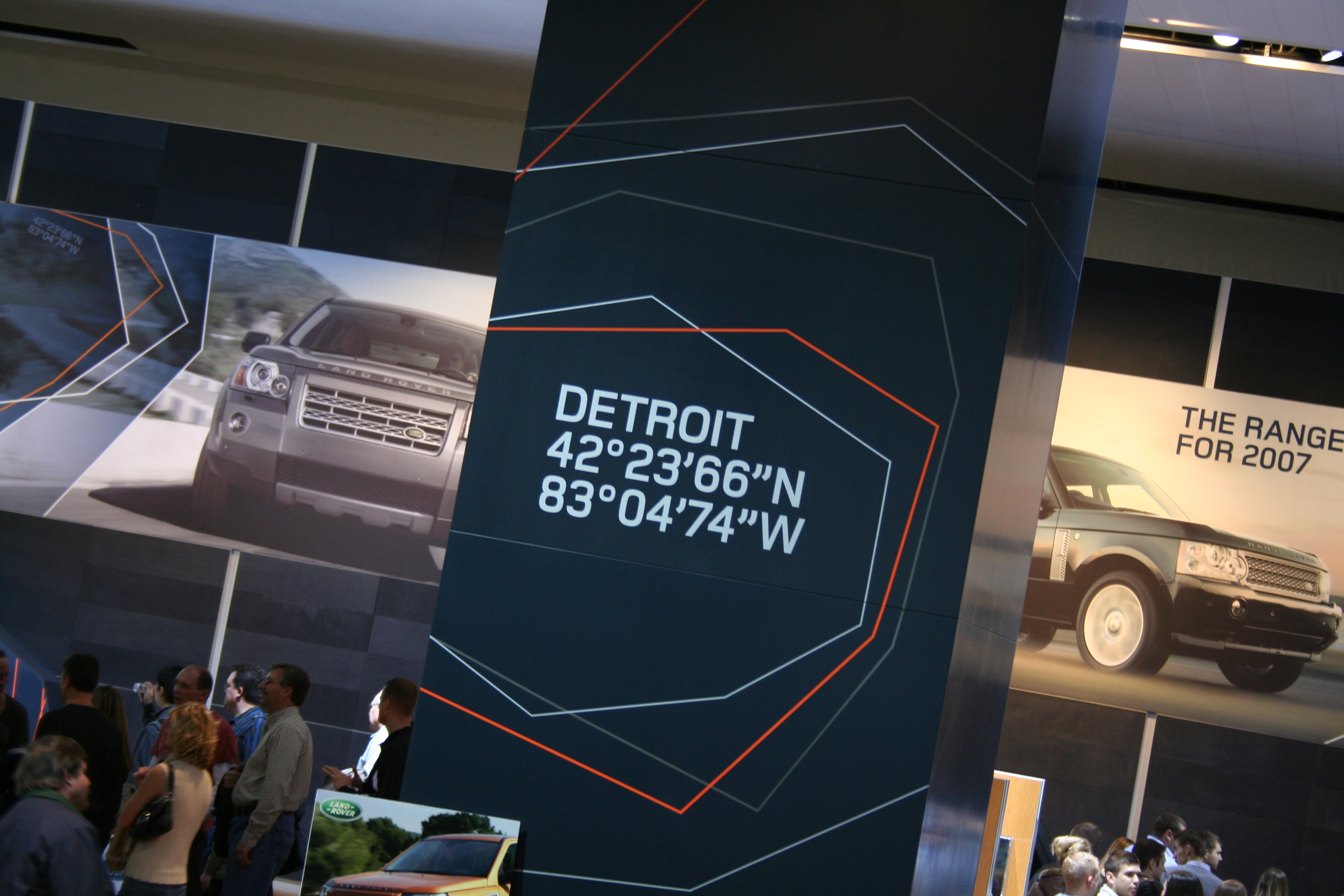
2007 North American International Auto Show

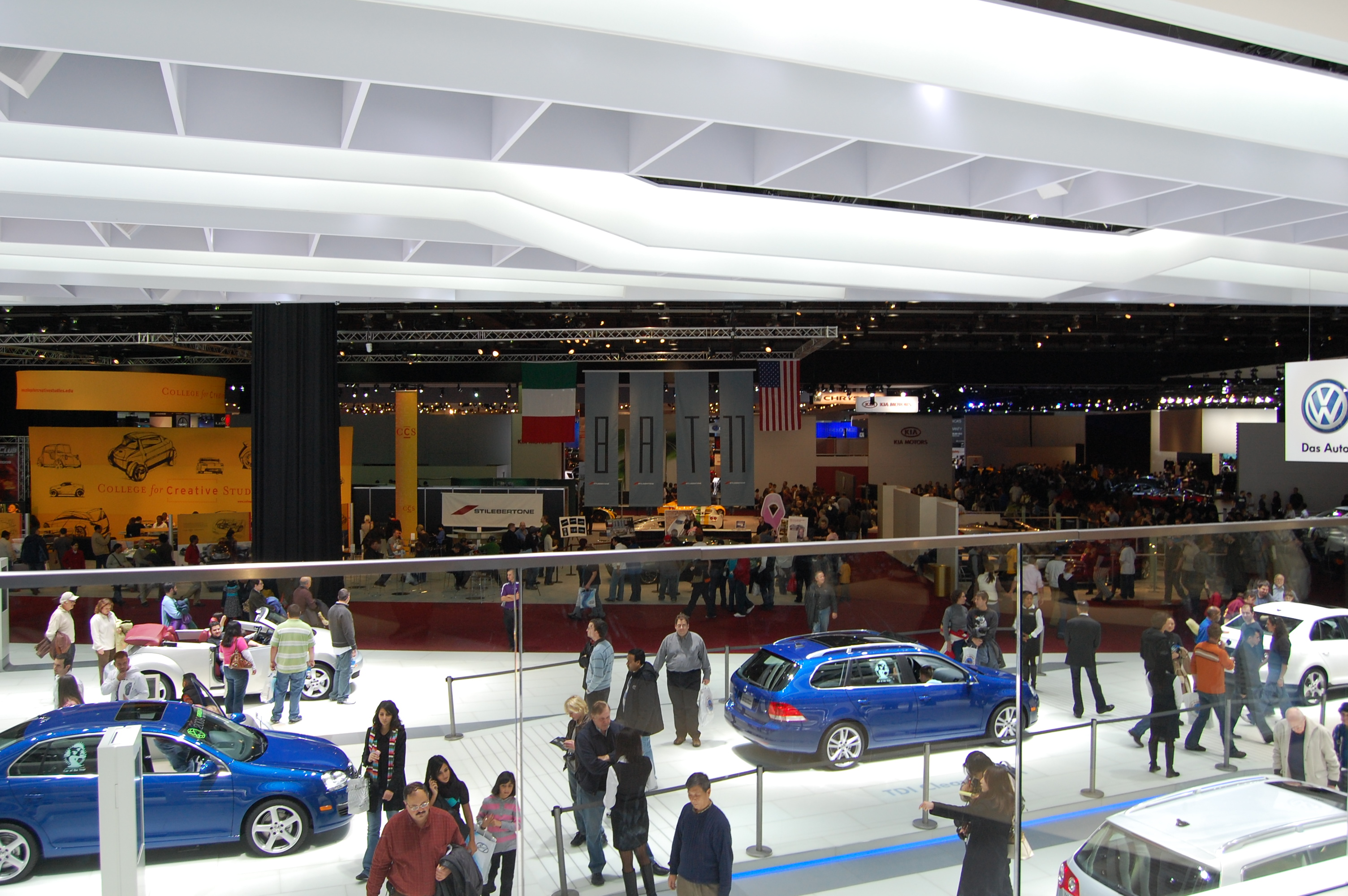
NAIAS 2009 overlooking the Volkswagen exhibit

== Editions ==
=== 2026 ===
The 2026 public show ran from January 17–25, with media and industry events on the 14th and 15th, and charity preview (featuring a performance by Robin Thicke) on the 16th.

=== 2025 ===
In 2025, the show was moved back to its previous January timeframe; as a result, no show was held in 2024. The 2025 public show ran from January 11–20, with the media and charity previews held on the 10th, the latter featuring a performance by Flo Rida.

Like in 2023, the 2025 show was held entirely indoors at Huntington Place. Ford, General Motors, Kia, Stellantis, Toyota, and Volkswagen returned as full exhibitors; and BMW, Honda, Hyundai, Ineos, Mazda, and Mercedes-Benz were represented by exhibits organized by local dealerships, with Ineos making their first Detroit Auto Show appearance. High-end and exotic vehicles were exhibited in The Gallery, a separate section also programmed by local dealers.

The 2025 show included four test tracks on the show floor: the returning Powering Michigan EV Experience, featuring electric vehicles from BMW, Cadillac, Chevrolet, GMC, and Rivian (in the latter's Detroit Auto Show debut); the new Detroit Grand Prix Track, with electric and gasoline-powered electric vehicles from Buick, Ford, Honda, Mazda, and Volkswagen; and the returning Ford Bronco Built Wild Experience and Camp Jeep off-road courses in their manufacturers' respective exhibits.

The 2025 show featured few vehicle introductions, in part due to the decline in popularity of auto shows in North America, and in part due to conflicting with the Consumer Electronics Show, where several concept and production vehicles were introduced along with vehicle interior technology and concepts were showcased. The only new vehicles shown were from Ford, who revealed the Mustang RTR prototype and Mustang GTD Spirit of America edition in a separate press conference before the event on January 9.

==== Production car introductions ====
- Ford Mustang GTD Spirit of America (special edition)

==== Concept car introductions ====
- Ford Mustang RTR (prototype)

=== 2023 ===
The 2023 public show ran from September 16–24, with the media preview on the 13th and charity preview (featuring a performance by Jennifer Hudson) on the 15th. Notably, its run coincided with the beginning of the 2023 United Auto Workers strike, which targeted Ford, General Motors, and Stellantis, the show's three largest exhibitors. The UAW held a rally outside Huntington Place on the evening of the charity preview, but did not picket the event or call for a consumer boycott of the show.

For 2023, the show returned to its previous all-indoor format. All three Detroit-based automakers exhibited, joined by Kia, Toyota, and Volkswagen. Subaru declined to return for the 2023 show, while Honda and Hyundai were represented in exhibits organized by their Detroit-area dealerships. Like in 2022, non-participating automakers were represented by smaller displays of their automobiles in a separate section of the show floor.

The 2023 show introduced the Powering Michigan EV Experience, a large indoor test track at the rear of the show floor, on which attendees rode in new electric vehicles from GM, Ford, Volkswagen, BMW, and Tesla. The track included a 300-foot acceleration strip, and a serpentine course to demonstrate the vehicles' handling. The separate Ford and Jeep off-road demonstration courses, as well as the Ram truck course, returned from the 2022 show. Tesla's participation in the EV Experience marked the company's first NAIAS appearance since 2015.

==== Production car introductions ====
- 2025 Cadillac CT5 (refresh)
- 2024 Ford F-150 (refresh)
- 2024 Ford Mustang Mach-E Rally (auto show debut)
- 2024 GMC Acadia
- 2024 Jeep Gladiator (refresh)

=== 2022 ===
In 2022, the full NAIAS returned to Huntington Place, with the public show running from September 17–25, preceded by the media preview on the 14th and the charity preview on the 16th. The media preview was visited by then-U.S. President Joe Biden, and the charity preview featured a performance by Nile Rodgers & Chic.

The 2022 edition featured a redesigned layout, with the main exhibits indoors on the show floor at Huntington Place, and other supporting events outdoors in nearby Hart Plaza. Stellantis, Ford, General Motors, Toyota, and Subaru were the only automakers with major exhibits on the convention floor, while Volkswagen had a smaller display in the lobby of Huntington Place. In recognition of Jeep ducking, Stellantis rented the World's Largest Rubber Duck for the show, which stood in the plaza outside Huntington Place. Many non-participating automakers, such as Nissan, Hyundai, and Mercedes-Benz, were represented by new vehicles on display on the convention floor, but without a branded exhibit.

Returning from Motor Bella were interactive test tracks on the show floor, offering rides in Ford and Stellantis vehicles, included with show admission. Ford's track featured an acceleration strip, used to demonstrate the F-150 Lightning, and a large hill, showcasing the Bronco's off-road capabilities. Stellantis operated two tracks: Camp Jeep, an off-road course featuring the Jeep Wrangler, Gladiator, and Grand Cherokee; and a second demonstration course featuring Ram pickup trucks.

==== Production car introductions ====
- 2023 Chevrolet Tahoe RST Performance Edition
- 2023 Chrysler 300C
- 2024 Ford Mustang
- 2023 Jeep Grand Cherokee 4xe 30th Anniversary Edition
- 2023 Jeep Wrangler Willys 4xe
- 2023 Lincoln Corsair (refresh)
- 2023 Toyota Crown (auto show debut)

==== Concept car introductions ====
- Lincoln Star (auto show debut)

The 2023 North American Car, Truck, and Utility of the Year semi-finalists were announced and displayed at the show, with the winners to be announced in January 2023.

=== 2021: Motor Bella ===
Plans for the full NAIAS to return in September 2021 were cancelled due to the COVID-19 pandemic. In lieu, the show's organizers hosted an outdoor event, Motor Bella, at the M-1 Concourse in nearby Pontiac from September 21–26.

==== Production car introductions ====
- 2022 Toyota Tundra

=== 2020 (cancelled) ===
The 2020 show was scheduled to be held from June 13–20 but it was canceled in March 2020 due to the worldwide COVID-19 pandemic.

=== 2019 ===
The 2019 show ran from January 19–27 at Cobo Center and opened with the lowering of a 2020 Shelby GT500 from the Cobo Center ceiling. 30 cars launched in the previews, down from 69 in 2018. Among various cars, it displayed new versions of the Kia Soul. Other major attractions included the 2020 Shelby GT500. USA Today noted that Chevrolet, Ford, Honda, Jeep and Toyota were all re-introducing discontinued models at the show with the media previews, for example the Toyota GR Supra and midsize Ford Ranger. Virtual reality displays were utilized by several carmakers. A number of protests took place outside the event regarding Ford's environmental record and GM layoffs.

- January 12 – Gallery
- January 14–15 – Press preview
- January 14–17 – Automobili-D (mobility and autonomy exposition)
- January 16–17 – Industry preview
- January 18 – Charity preview
- January 19–27 – Open to public

==== Production car introductions ====
- 2020 Cadillac XT6
- 2020 Ford Explorer
- 2020 Ford Mustang Shelby GT500
- 2019 Hyundai Elantra GT N-Line
- 2020 Kia Telluride
- 2020 Lexus RC F Track Edition
- 2019 Ram 2500/3500 HD
- 2020 Subaru WRX STI S209
- 2020 Toyota Supra
- 2020 Volkswagen Passat

==== Concept car introductions ====
- GAC Group (Trumpchi) Entranze
- Infiniti QX Inspiration (electric SUV concept)
- Lexus LC Convertible concept
- Nissan IMs (EV sports sedan)
- Workhorse Group SureFly eVTOL Octocopter concept

==== Race car introductions ====
- Hyundai Veloster N TCR
- Subaru WRX STI VT19x (with new livery)

At the show, Ford Motor Company and Volkswagen Group announced a global alliance to collaborate on commercial vans and mid-size pickup trucks, and potentially share EV and autonomous vehicle technology in the future.

=== 2018 ===
The 2018 show took place January 20 to 28 at the Cobo Center. It ran from January 14 to 28. The press preview was extended by one day and the second edition of Automobili-D was extended by three days.

The Washington Post reported that the fastest cars at the 2018 auto show included the 2019 Acura NSX, the 2019 Dodge Challenger SRT Hellcat Widebody, the 2019 Nissan GT-R, the 2019 Alfa Romeo Giulia, and the 2019 Corvette ZR1.

- January 14–16 – Press preview
- January 14–21 – Automobili-D (mobility and autonomy exposition)
- January 17–18 – Industry preview
- January 19 – Charity preview
- January 20–28 – Open to the public

==== Production car introductions ====
- 2019 Acura RDX (prototype)
- 2019 Audi A7 (US debut)
- 2019 BMW i8 Coupe (refresh)
- 2018 BMW X2
- 2019 Chevrolet Silverado
- 2019 Ford Edge (refresh), Edge ST
- 2019 Ford Mustang Bullitt
- 2019 Ford Ranger
- 2019 Honda Insight (prototype)
- 2019 Hyundai Veloster (second generation)
- 2019 Jeep Cherokee (refresh)
- 2019 Kia Forte sedan
- 2019 Lamborghini Urus (US debut)
- 2019 Mercedes-AMG CLS53, E53 Coupe/Cabriolet
- 2019 Mercedes-Benz G-Class
- 2018 Mercedes-Benz GLS-Class (X166) Grand Edition
- 2019 Mini Hatch (refresh)
- 2019 Ram 1500
- 2018 Rolls-Royce Phantom (US debut)
- 2018 Smart Fortwo ED 10th Anniversary Edition (US debut)
- 2019 Toyota Avalon
- 2019 Volkswagen Jetta
- 2018 Volkswagen Passat GT

==== Concept car introductions ====
- GAC Group (Trumpchi) Enverge
- Infiniti Q Inspiration
- Lexus LF-1 Limitless
- Nissan Xmotion

=== 2017 ===
The 2017 show ran from January 9 to 22. Automobili-D, an exposition dedicated to automotive autonomy and mobility, ran in conjunction with the show on January 8–12. Sam Slaughter served as chairman.

- January 9–10 – Press preview
- January 11–12 – Industry preview
- January 13 – Charity preview
- January 14–22 – Open to the public

==== Production car introductions ====
- 2018 Audi A5/S5 Cabriolet
- 2018 Audi SQ5
- 2017 BMW 5 Series
- 2018 Chevrolet Traverse
- 2018 Ford F-150 (refresh)
- 2018 Ford Mustang (refresh – shown during public days)
- 2018 GMC Terrain
- 2018 Honda Odyssey
- 2018 Kia Stinger
- 2018 Lexus LS (XF50)
- 2018 Mercedes-AMG GT (refresh), GT C Coupe
- 2018 Mercedes-Benz E-Class Coupe
- 2018 Mercedes-Benz GLA-Class (refresh)
- 2017 Mercedes-Benz S-Class Coupe Night Edition
- 2017 Nissan Rogue Sport
- 2017 Ram 1500 Rebel Black
- 2018 Subaru WRX (refresh)
- 2018 Toyota Camry
- 2018 Volkswagen Atlas R-Line
- 2018 Volkswagen Tiguan (long-wheelbase version)
- 2018 Volvo V90 (North American debut)

==== Concept car introductions ====
- Audi Q8 concept
- BMW Concept X2 (North American debut)
- Ford Transit Connect Hybrid Taxi Prototype
- Infiniti QX50 Concept
- Nissan Vmotion 2.0
- Volkswagen I.D. Buzz

==== Race car introductions ====
- BMW M6 GT3 (North American debut)
- 2018 Toyota Camry Cup Car

=== 2016 ===
The 2016 show ran from January 11 to 24. The show drew 5,068 credentialed members of the media from 60 countries during the media preview, with the industry preview afterwards drawing 39,788 visitors from 25 countries and 2,000 companies. Among celebrity visitors was Barack Obama. The first day saw the debut of models like the Lexus LC 500, the new Pacifica minivan, and an Audi hydrogen concept car.

- January 11–12 – Press preview
- January 13–14 – Industry preview
- January 15 – Charity preview
- January 16–24 – Open to the public

==== Production car introductions ====
- 2017 Audi A4 (North American debut)
- 2017 Audi A4 allroad quattro
- 2016 BMW M2
- 2016 BMW X4 M40i
- 2016 Buick Envision (North American debut)
- 2017 Chevrolet Cruze Hatchback
- 2017 Chrysler Pacifica
- Fisker Force 1
- 2017 Ford F-150 Raptor SuperCrew
- 2017 Ford Fusion (refresh)
- 2017 Genesis G90
- 2017 Genesis G80 (refresh)
- 2017 GMC Acadia
- 2017 Honda Ridgeline
- 2016 Infiniti Q50 (refresh)
- 2017 Infiniti Q60
- 2016 Infiniti QX60 (refresh)
- 2017 Kia Forte/Forte5 (refresh)
- 2018 Lexus LC 500
- 2017 Lincoln Continental
- 2017 Mercedes-AMG S65 Cabriolet
- 2017 Mercedes-Benz E-Class (sedan)
- 2017 Mercedes-Benz SLC-Class (refresh)
- 2017 Porsche 911 Turbo, Turbo S (991.2)
- 2017 Smart Fortwo Cabrio (North American debut)
- 2017 Volvo S90

==== Concept car introductions ====
- Acura Precision Concept
- Audi h-tron quattro concept
- Buick Avista
- Kia Telluride
- Nissan IDS (US debut)
- Nissan Titan Warrior Concept
- Volkswagen Tiguan GTE Active Concept

=== 2015 ===
The 2015 show ran from January 12 to 25.

- January 12–13 – Press preview
- January 14–15 – Industry preview
- January 16 – Charity preview
- January 17–25 – Open to the public

==== Production car introductions ====
- 2017 Acura NSX
- 2015 Alfa Romeo 4C Spider
- 2017 Audi Q7
- 2016 BMW 6 Series, M6 (refresh)
- 2016 Buick Cascada
- 2016 Cadillac CTS-V
- 2016 Chevrolet Volt (second generation)
- 2017 Ford F-150 Raptor
- 2017 Ford GT
- 2016 Ford Shelby GT350R Mustang
- 2016 Hyundai Sonata Hybrid (North American debut)
- 2016 Hyundai Sonata Plug-in Hybrid
- 2017 Jaguar XE (North American debut)
- 2016 Lexus GS F
- 2016 Lincoln MKX
- 2016 Mercedes-Benz C350 Plug-in Hybrid
- 2015 Mercedes-Benz C450 AMG
- 2016 Mercedes-Benz GLE-Class Coupé
- 2015 Mini John Cooper Works Hardtop
- 2016 Nissan Titan XD
- 2015 Porsche 911 Targa 4 GTS
- 2015 Porsche Cayenne Turbo S (refresh)
- 2015 Ram 1500 Rebel
- 2016 Range Rover Td6, Range Rover Sport Td6 (North American debut)
- 2016 Toyota Tacoma
- 2016 Volvo S60 Cross Country
- 2016 Volvo S60 Inscription (LWB)

==== Concept car introductions ====
- Buick Avenir
- Chevrolet Bolt EV
- Honda FCV Concept (North American debut)
- Hyundai Santa Cruz Crossover Truck Concept
- Infiniti Q60 Concept
- Volkswagen Cross Coupe GTE Concept

=== 2014 ===
The 2014 show ran from January 13 to 26.

- January 13–14 – Press preview
- January 15–16 – Industry preview
- January 17 – Charity preview
- January 18–26 – Open to the public

==== Production car introductions ====
- 2015 Audi A8/S8 (facelift) (North American debut)
- 2015 Audi Q3 (North American debut)
- 2014 BMW 2 Series
- 2015 BMW M3
- 2015 BMW M4
- 2015 Cadillac ATS Coupe
- 2015 Chevrolet Corvette Z06
- 2015 Chrysler 200
- 2015 Ford F-150
- 2015 Ford Mustang (auto show debut)
- 2015 GMC Canyon
- 2015 Honda Fit
- 2015 Hyundai Genesis
- 2015 Lexus RC (North American debut)
- 2015 Lexus RC F
- 2015 Mercedes-Benz C-Class
- 2015 Mercedes-Benz GLA45 AMG
- 2015 Mercedes-Benz S600
- 2015 Porsche 911 Targa
- 2015 Subaru WRX STI
- 2015 Volkswagen Golf R (North American debut)

==== Concept car introductions ====
- Acura TLX Prototype
- Audi allroad shooting brake
- Infiniti Q50 Eau Rouge
- Kia GT4 Stinger
- Mercedes-Benz Concept S-Class Coupé (North American debut)
- Mini John Cooper Works concept
- Nissan IDx Freeflow and IDx NISMO (U.S. debut)
- Nissan Sport Sedan concept
- Toyota FT-1
- Volkswagen Beetle Dune
- Volkswagen Passat BlueMotion Concept
- Volvo Concept XC Coupe

==== Race car introductions ====
- Acura TLX GT Race Car
- Chevrolet Corvette C7.R

=== 2013 ===
The 2013 show ran from January 14 to 27.

- January 14–15 – Press preview
- January 16–17 – Industry preview
- January 18 – Charity preview
- January 19–27 – Open to the public

==== Production car introductions ====
- 2014 Audi R8 (facelift)
- 2013 Audi RS5 Cabriolet (North American debut)
- 2014 Audi RS7
- 2014 Audi SQ5 (gasoline version)
- Bentley Continental GT Speed Convertible
- 2013 BMW 320i (U.S. market debut)
- 2014 BMW M6 Gran Coupe
- 2014 BMW Z4 (E89)
- 2014 Cadillac ELR
- 2014 Chevrolet Corvette Stingray
- 2014 Chevrolet Silverado
- 2013 Chrysler 300 Motown Edition
- 2013 Dodge Dart GT
- 2015 Ford Transit (North American debut)
- 2014 GMC Sierra
- 2014 Infiniti Q50
- 2014 Jeep Compass
- 2014 Jeep Grand Cherokee (facelift)
- 2014 Kia Cadenza (North American debut)
- 2014 Lexus IS
- 2014 Maserati Quattroporte
- 2014 Mercedes-Benz CLA-Class
- 2014 Mercedes-Benz E-Class (facelift)
- 2014 Mini John Cooper Works Paceman
- 2014 Nissan Versa Note (North American debut)
- 2014 Porsche Cayenne Turbo S
- 2013 Shelby Focus ST
- 2014 Volkswagen Tiguan R-Line
- 2014 Volkswagen Touareg R-Line

==== Concept car introductions ====
- Acura MDX pre-production concept
- Acura NSX Concept (updated 2013 version with interior)
- BMW Concept 4 Series Coupe
- Fiat 500 Abarth "Tenebra" and "Cattiva" design concepts
- Ford Atlas
- Honda Urban SUV Concept
- Hyundai HCD-14 Genesis
- Lincoln MKC concept
- Nissan Resonance
- Toyota Corolla Furia
- Volkswagen Crossblue
- Volkswagen Passat Performance Concept

Chevrolet also displayed five models sold outside the United States: the Onix, Orlando, Sail, Spin, and Trax.

=== 2012 ===
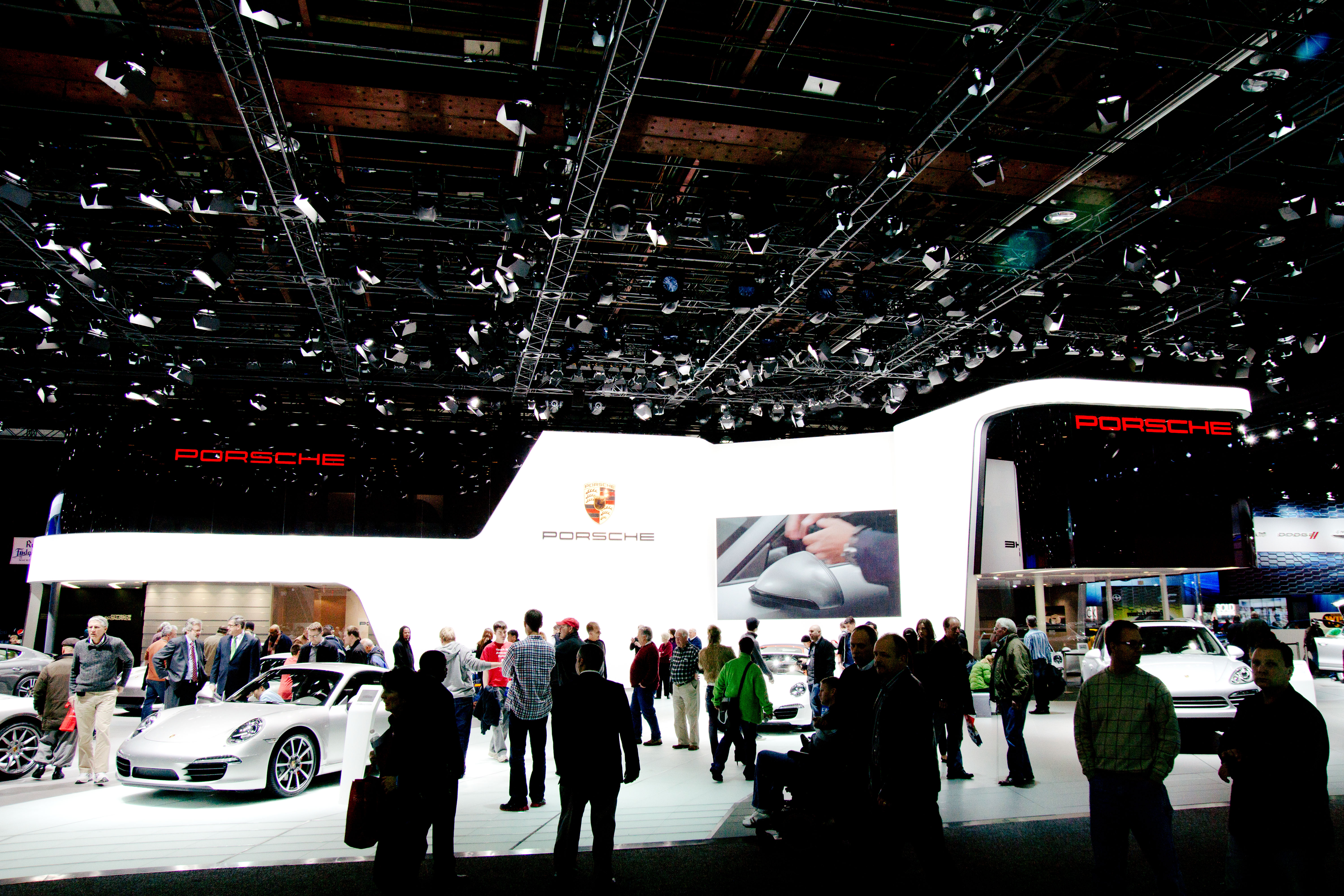
Porsche exhibit stand at the 2012 NAIAS

The 2012 show ran from January 9 to 22.

- January 9–10 – Press preview
- January 11–12 – Industry preview
- January 13 – Charity preview
- January 14–22 – Open to the public

Nissan returned to the show after a three-year absence.

Bryan Herta was presented with the Baby Borg trophy for the 2011 Indianapolis 500 during the show, which coincided with the promotion of the return of the IZOD IndyCar Series to Detroit later in June. A replica Baby Borg was also presented to Suzie Wheldon, the widow of the winning driver of the race.

==== Production car introductions ====
- 2013 Acura RDX
- 2013 Audi A4
- 2013 Audi S4
- 2013 Audi allroad
- 2012 Bentley Continental GT V8
- 2012 BMW 3 Series (North American debut)
- 2012 BMW ActiveHybrid 3
- 2012 BMW ActiveHybrid 5
- 2013 Buick Encore
- 2013 Cadillac ATS
- 2013 Chevrolet Sonic RS
- 2012 Chrysler 200 Super S
- 2012 Dodge Charger Redline
- 2013 Dodge Dart
- 2013 Ford Fusion
- 2013 Hyundai Genesis Coupe (North American debut)
- 2013 Hyundai Veloster Turbo
- 2013 Lexus LX
- 2013 Mercedes-Benz SL-Class
- 2012 Mini Roadster
- 2012 Porsche 911 Carrera/Carrera S Cabriolet
- 2013 Scion FR-S (North American debut)
- 2013 Subaru BRZ (U.S. debut)
- 2012 Toyota Prius c (North American debut)
- 2013 Volkswagen Jetta Hybrid

==== Concept car introductions ====
- Acura ILX concept
- Acura NSX concept
- Audi Q3 Vail
- Chevrolet Code 130R
- Chevrolet Tru 140S
- Chrysler 700C
- Ford Evos (North American debut)
- Honda Accord Coupe concept
- Lexus LF-LC
- Lincoln MKZ concept
- Maserati Kubang (North American debut)
- Nissan e-NV200 Concept
- Nissan Pathfinder concept
- Smart For-Us
- Toyota NS4
- Volkswagen E-Bugster
- Volvo XC60 Plug-in Hybrid

=== 2011 ===
The 2011 show ran from January 10 to 23.

- January 10–11 – Press preview
- January 12–13 – Industry preview
- January 14 – Charity preview
- January 15–23 – Open to the public

Porsche returned to the show for the first time since 2007. A new "Smarter Living in Michigan" section showcased alternative energy technologies outside of the automotive sector, in addition to an electric vehicle track condensed from its 2010 size.

==== Production car introductions ====
- 2012 Audi A6
- 2012 BMW 1 Series M Coupe
- 2012 BMW 6 Series (F12) Convertible
- 2012 Buick Verano
- 2012 Chevrolet Sonic
- 2011 Chrysler 300
- 2012 Ford C-Max (North American debut – production plans canceled)
- 2013 Ford C-Max Energi
- 2013 Ford C-Max Hybrid
- 2012 Hyundai Veloster
- 2011 Jeep Compass
- 2012 Mercedes-Benz C-Class
- 2012 Mercedes-Benz S350 Bluetec
- 2013 Toyota Prius Plug-in
- 2012 Toyota Prius V
- 2012 Volkswagen Passat (North American version)

==== Concept car introductions ====
- Ford Vertrek
- GMC Sierra All Terrain HD
- Honda Civic & Civic Si concept
- Hyundai Curb
- Kia KV7
- Mini Paceman
- Porsche 918 RSR
- Toyota Prius C Concept

=== 2010 ===
The 2010 show ran from January 11 to 24.

- January 11–12 – Press preview
- January 13–14 – Industry preview
- January 15 – Charity preview
- January 16–24 – Open to the public

A new "Electric Avenue" section showcased electric vehicles from around the world, including some entrants for the Automotive X-Prize. Saab, Hummer, Infiniti, Suzuki, and Porsche did not attend the 2010 show. Nissan and Mitsubishi did not have regular floor space, but the Nissan Leaf and Mitsubishi i MiEV appeared in the Electric Avenue section. A small electrical fire at the Audi exhibit caused an evacuation on January 21. Nobody was hurt.

==== Production car introductions ====
- 2011 BMW 740i/Li (North American debut)
- 2011 BMW Z4 (E89) sDrive35is
- 2011 Cadillac CTS-V Coupe
- 2012 Ford Focus
- 2011 Ford Mustang GT
- 2011 Ford Mustang Boss 302R
- 2011 GMC Acadia Denali
- 2011 Honda CR-Z
- 2010 Hyundai Santa Fe
- 2010 Jeep Liberty Renegade
- 2010 Jeep Wrangler Islander / Mountain editions
- 2011 Lincoln MKX
- 2011 Mercedes-Benz E-Class Cabriolet
- Revenge Verde supercar

==== Concept car introductions ====
- Audi e-tron Detroit showcar
- BMW Concept ActiveE
- Buick Regal GS
- Cadillac XTS Platinum
- Chevrolet Aveo RS
- Chrysler/Lancia Delta
- Fiat 500 Elettra
- GMC Granite
- Hyundai Blue-Will plug-in hybrid
- Mini Beachcomber
- Toyota FT-CH dedicated hybrid
- Volkswagen NCC
- Volvo C30 electric

=== 2009 ===
The 2009 show ran from January 11 to 25.

- January 11–13 – Press days
- January 14–15 – Industry days
- January 16 – Charity preview
- January 17–25 – Open to the public

Nissan, Infiniti, Mitsubishi, Suzuki, Rolls-Royce, Land Rover, Ferrari, and Porsche did not attend the 2009 auto show, the largest number of non-returning automakers in the show's history. As a result, the show became the first with Chinese automakers (BYD and Brilliance) exhibited on the main floor.

==== Production car introductions ====
- 2010 Audi A3 2.0 TDI (North American debut)
- 2009 BMW Z4 (E89)
- 2010 Buick LaCrosse
- 2010 Cadillac SRX
- 2011 Chevrolet Cruze (North American debut)
- 2010 Chevrolet Equinox
- Fisker Karma
- 2010 Ford Mustang Shelby GT500
- 2010 Ford Taurus
- 2010 Honda Insight
- 2010 Jaguar XFR
- 2010 Jaguar XKR
- 2010 Lexus HS 250h
- 2010 Lincoln MKT
- 2009 Mini Cooper Convertible
- 2009 Saab 9-5 Griffin
- 2010 Toyota Camry
- 2010 Toyota Prius

The 2010 Mercedes-Benz E-Class was announced and shown to invited members of the press, but was not put on public display until the March 2010 Geneva Motor Show.

GM also announced the production of the Chevrolet Spark mini-car (previously shown as the Chevrolet Beat concept), for sale in Europe in 2010 and North America in 2011, as well as the Chevrolet Orlando compact MPV, for sale in North America in 2011. The Spark will be shown at the 2009 Geneva Motor Show.

==== Concept car introductions ====
- Audi Sportback concept
- Cadillac Converj
- Chevrolet Orlando concept (North American debut)
- Chrysler 200C EV
- Dodge Circuit EV
- Fisker Karma S Concept
- Jeep Patriot EV
- Kia Soul'ster
- Lincoln C
- Mercedes-Benz BlueZero concepts
  - E-Cell (electric)
  - E-Plus (plug-in hybrid), 100 km electric-only range
  - F-Cell (fuel cell)
- Subaru Legacy concept
- Toyota FT-EV
- Volkswagen Concept BlueSport
- Volvo S60 concept

=== 2008 ===
The 2008 show ran from January 13 to 27.

- January 13–15 – Press days
- January 16–17 – Industry days
- January 18 – Charity preview
- January 19–27 – Open to the public

==== Production car introductions ====
- 2009 Audi TTS
- 2008 BMW 1 Series Convertible (North American debut)
- 2009 BMW 335d (North American debut)
- 2009 BMW X5 (E70) xDrive35d
- 2009 BMW X6
- 2009 Cadillac CTS-V
- 2009 Chevrolet Corvette ZR-1
- 2009 Dodge Ram
- 2009 Ford F-150
- 2009 Hyundai Genesis
- 2012 Land Rover Range Rover Evoque
- 2009 Kia Borrego
- 2009 Mazda RX-8
- 2009 Mercedes-Benz SLK-Class (North American debut)
- 2009 Mitsubishi Lancer Ralliart
- 2008 Scion xB RS 5.0 ("Mica Gold")
- 2009 Saturn Vue Green Line 2-Mode Hybrid
- 2009 Subaru Forester
- 2009 Toyota Venza
- 2009 Volkswagen Passat CC

==== Concept car introductions ====
- Audi R8 TDI
- Buick Riviera (North American debut)
- BYD F6DM
- Cadillac CTS Coupe concept
- Cadillac Provoq (also appearing at the 2008 Consumer Electronics Show)
- Chrysler ecoVoyager
- Dodge ZEO
- Fisker Karma
- Ford Explorer America
- Ford Verve
- Hummer HX
- Honda Pilot Prototype
- Jeep Renegade
- Land Rover LRX
- Lincoln MKT concept
- Lexus LF-A Roadster
- Mazda Furai
- Mercedes-Benz Vision GLK Freeside
- Mitsubishi Concept-RA
- Nissan Forum
- Saab 9-4X BioPower
- Saturn Flextreme
- Toyota A-BAT

=== 2007 ===
The 2007 show was held from January 7 to 21.

- January 7–9 – Press days
- January 10–11 – Industry days
- January 12 – Charity preview
- January 13–21 – Open to the public

==== Production car introductions ====
- 2008 Audi Q7 3.0 TDi
- 2007 BMW 3 Series convertible
- 2008 Cadillac CTS
- 2008 Chevrolet Equinox Sport
- Chevrolet HHR Premium Edition
- 2008 Chevrolet Malibu
- 2008 Chrysler Town and Country
- 2008 Dodge Avenger
- 2008 Dodge Grand Caravan
- 2008 Dodge Magnum
- 2008 Dodge Viper SRT-10
- 2008 Ford Five Hundred (renamed to Ford Taurus for the 2007 Chicago Auto Show)
- 2008 Ford Focus
- 2007 Hyundai Veracruz (North American introduction)
- 2008 Infiniti QX56
- 2008 Lexus IS-F
- 2007 Maserati Quattroporte Automatica
- 2008 Mazda Tribute HEV
- 2007 MINI Cooper (North American introduction)
- 2007 MINI Sidewalk
- 2008 Mitsubishi Lancer
- 2008 Nissan Rogue
- 2008 Pontiac G6 GXP
- 2008 Pontiac Torrent GXP
- 2008 Porsche Cayenne
- 2008 Rolls-Royce Phantom Drophead Coupé
- 2007 Scion tC RS 3.0 ("Blizzard Pearl")
- 2008 Smart Fortwo (North American introduction)
- 2008 Subaru Legacy (North American introduction)
- 2008 Subaru Outback (North American introduction)
- 2007 Toyota Tundra CrewMax

==== Concept car introductions ====
- Acura Advanced Sports Car concept
- Audi Q7 V12 TDI concept (North American introduction)
- Changfeng Liebao CS7 concept
- Changfeng Liebao CS6 concept
- Changfeng Feibao CT5 concept
- Changfeng UU-CT3 concept
- Changfeng rhombus concept car
- Chevrolet Camaro Convertible concept
- Chevrolet Volt
- Chrysler Nassau
- Dodge Viper SRT-10 Mopar concept
- Ford Airstream
- Ford Interceptor
- Honda Accord Coupe concept
- Hummer H3 Open-Top concept
- Jaguar C-XF (Concept XF)
- Jeep Trailhawk
- Kia Kue
- Lexus LF-A (updated concept)
- Lincoln MKR concept
- Mazda Ryuga
- Mercedes-Benz Vision GL420 Bluetec
- Mercedes-Benz Ocean Drive
- Mitsubishi Prototype-X (Lancer Evolution Prototype)
- Nissan Bevel
- Saab 9-3 BioPower Hybrid concept
- Suzuki Flix
- Toyota FT-HS Hybrid Sports concept
- Volvo XC60 concept
- Volvo BeeVan

GM also displayed five "global" concept cars for the first time in North America: Chevrolet T2X, Chevrolet WTCC, Holden Efijy, Opel Antara GTC, and Saab Aero-X.

=== 2006 ===
The 2006 show was held from January 8 to 22.

- January 8–10 – Press days
- January 11–12 – Industry days
- January 13 – Charity preview
- January 14–22 – Open to the public

==== Production car introductions ====
- 2006 Audi RS4
- 2007 Audi S6
- 2007 Audi S8
- 2006 BMW 325xi Sports Wagon
- 2007 BMW M Roadster
- 2006 BMW M6
- 2006 BMW Z4 (E85) Coupe
- 2007 Cadillac Escalade
- 2007 Cadillac Escalade ESV
- 2007 Cadillac Escalade EXT
- 2007 Chevrolet Aveo
- 2007 Chevrolet Suburban LTZ
- 2007 Chevrolet Tahoe LTZ
- 2007 Chevrolet Tahoe Two-Mode Hybrid
- 2007 Chrysler Aspen
- 2007 Dodge Caliber
- 2007 Ford Edge
- 2007 Ford Shelby GT500
- 2007 Ford Explorer Sport Trac Adrenalin
- 2007 GMC Yukon
- 2007 GMC Yukon XL
- 2007 Honda Fit
- 2007 Hummer H3x
- 2007 Hyundai Santa Fe
- 2007 Jaguar XK convertible
- 2007 Jeep Compass
- 2007 Jeep Wrangler
- 2007 Kia Optima
- 2007 Lexus LS
- 2007 Lincoln MKX
- 2006 Maserati GranSport Spyder
- 2006 Maserati Quattroporte Sport GT and Executive GT
- 2007 Mercedes-Benz E320 Bluetec
- 2007 Mercedes-Benz GL320 Bluetec
- 2007 Mercedes-Benz GL450
- 2007 Mercedes-Benz ML63 AMG
- 2007 Mercedes-Benz R63 AMG
- 2007 Mercedes-Benz S550
- 2007 Mercedes-Benz S65 AMG
- 2007 Mitsubishi Eclipse Spyder
- 2007 Nissan Versa
- 2007 Nissan Sentra
- 2007 Pontiac Solstice GXP
- 2007 Saturn Sky
- 2007 Saturn Vue Green Line
- 2007 Toyota Camry (AutoWeek "Most Significant")
- 2007 Toyota Camry Hybrid
- 2007 Toyota FJ Cruiser
- 2007 Toyota Yaris
- 2006 Volvo C70 Convertible
- Geely 7151CK (the first Chinese automobile ever shown in the United States, only shown to press)

==== Concept car introductions ====
- Aston Martin Rapide concept
- Acura RDX prototype
- Audi Roadjet
- BMW X3 Hybrid Efficient Dynamics concept
- Buick Enclave concept
- Chevrolet Camaro concept (AutoWeek "Best In Show")
- Chrysler Imperial concept
- Dodge Challenger concept (AutoWeek "Best Concept")
- Ford F-250 Super Chief
- Ford Iosis (North American introduction)
- Ford Reflex
- Hyundai HCD9 Talus
- Infiniti G35 Coupe concept
- Jeep Patriot concept
- Kia Soul
- Lamborghini Miura concept
- Lincoln MKS concept
- Maybach Exelero
- Mazda Kabura concept
- Mazda Mazda5 hydrogen rotary concept
- Mini Concept Detroit
- Mitsubishi Concept-CT MIEV
- Nissan Urge (AutoWeek "Most Fun"), with built in Xbox 360
- Saab 9-5 Aero BioPower concept
- Subaru B5-TPH
- Toyota F3R
- Volvo C30 concept

=== 2005 ===
==== Production car introductions ====
- 2006 Acura RL
- 2006 Cadillac STS-V
- 2006 Chevrolet Corvette Z06
- 2006 Chrysler 300C SRT-8
- 2006 Dodge Charger
- 2006 Dodge Viper SRT-10 Coupe
- 2006 Ford Fusion
- 2006 Honda Ridgeline
- 2006 Hyundai Sonata
- 2006 Infiniti M
- 2006 Kia Rio
- 2006 Land Rover Range Rover
- 2006 Land Rover Range Rover Sport
- 2006 Lexus GS
- 2006 Lincoln Zephyr/MKZ
- 2006 Mercedes-Benz M-Class
- 2006 Mercury Milan
- 2006 Mitsubishi Eclipse
- 2006 Mitsubishi Raider
- 2006 Porsche 911 Cabrio
- 2005 Saab 9-7X
- 2006 Subaru B9 Tribeca
- 2005 Toyota Avalon

==== Concept car introductions ====
- Chrysler Firepower
- Ford Explorer Sport Trac Concept
- Ford Fairlane Concept
- Ford Shelby GR-1
- Ford SYNUS
- General Motors Sequel
- GMC Graphyte
- Infiniti Kuraza
- Jaguar Advanced Lightweight Coupe Concept
- Jeep Gladiator (2005 concept)
- Jeep Hurricane
- Kia KCD-II Mesa
- Lexus LF-A concept
- Mazda MX-Crossport
- Mercury Meta One
- Nissan AZEAL
- Opel Astra hybrid concept
- Saturn Aura concept
- Saturn Sky concept
- Suzuki Concept X
- Toyota FT-SX
- Volkswagen New Beetle Ragster
- Volvo 3CC

=== 2004 ===
The 2004 show was held from January 10 to 19.

==== Production car introductions ====
- 2005 Chevrolet Corvette (C6)
- 2004 Ferrari 612 Scaglietti
- 2005 Ford Five Hundred
- 2005 Ford Freestyle
- 2005 Ford Mustang
- 2005 Infiniti QX56
- 2005 Kia Spectra
- 2006 Lexus GS
- 2005 Nissan Frontier
- 2005 Nissan Pathfinder
- 2005 Pontiac G6
- 2005 Pontiac Solstice
- 2005 Scion tC
- 2005 Volvo S40
- 2005 Volvo V50

==== Concept car introductions ====
- Chevrolet Nomad (2004 concept)
- Chrysler ME Four-Twelve
- Dodge Slingshot
- Ford Bronco (2004 concept)
- Honda SUT
- Jeep Rescue
- Land Rover Range Stormer
- Lincoln Aviator (2004 concept)
- Lincoln Mark X
- Mazda MX-Micro Sport
- Mercedes-Benz Vision GST (2004 concept)
- Mitsubishi Eclipse Concept-E
- Mitsubishi Sport Truck Concept
- Nissan Actic
- Saturn Curve
- Toyota FTX
- Toyota Rugged Youth Utility
- Volkswagen Concept T

=== 2003 ===
The 2003 show was held from January 11 to 20.

==== Production car introductions ====
- 2004 Acura TSX
- 2004 Cadillac SRX
- 2004 Chevrolet Colorado
- 2005 Chevrolet Equinox
- 2004 Chevrolet Malibu
- 2004 Ford F-150
- 2003 Infiniti FX45
- 2004 Lexus RX 330
- 2004 Mitsubishi Endeavor
- 2004 Nissan Maxima
- 2004 Nissan Quest
- 2004 Nissan Titan
- 2004 Pontiac Grand Prix
- 2003 Rolls-Royce Phantom VII
- 2004 Toyota Sienna

==== Concept car introductions ====
- Aston Martin AMV8 Vantage
- Audi Pikes Peak
- BMW xActivity
- Buick Centieme
- Cadillac Sixteen
- Chevrolet Cheyenne
- Chevrolet SS (2003 concept)
- Dodge Avenger (2003 concept)
- Dodge Durango (concept)
- Dodge Kahuna
- Dodge Tomahawk V10 'motorcycle'
- Ford 427
- Ford Freestyle FX
- Ford Model U
- Ford Mustang GT (2003 concept)
- Infiniti Triant
- Kia KCD-1 Slice
- Lincoln Navicross
- Matra P75
- Mazda Washu
- Mercury Messenger
- Mitsubishi Tarmac Spyder
- Pontiac G6 (concept)
- Toyota Fine-S

=== 2002 ===
==== Production car introductions ====
- 2003 Audi A4 Cabriolet
- 2002 Bentley Arnage T
- 2004 Cadillac XLR
- 2003 Ford Expedition
- 2003 Honda Pilot
- 2003 Infiniti G35
- 2003 Lexus GX 470
- 2002 Maserati Coupé
- 2003 Mazda6
- 2003 Mazda RX-8 (North American debut)
- 2003 Range Rover
- 2003 Subaru Baja
- 2002 Suzuki Aerio
- 2003 Volvo XC90

==== Concept car introductions ====
- Acura RD-X concept
- Cadillac Cien
- Chevrolet Bel Air concept
- Chrysler Pacifica concept
- Dodge M80
- Dodge Ram SRT-10 concept
- Dodge Razor
- Ford GT40
- Ford Mighty F-350 Tonka
- Infiniti FX45 concept
- Isuzu Axiom SXR, SXT
- Jeep Compass concept
- Lincoln Continental concept
- Mercedes-Benz Vision GST
- Mitsubishi SUP (Sports Utility Pack)
- Nissan Quest concept
- Pontiac Solstice concept
- Saab 9-3X concept
- Toyota ccX
- Volkswagen Magellan

=== 2001 ===
==== Production car introductions ====
- Acura RSX
- BMW M3 Convertible
- Daewoo Leganza
- Dodge Viper SRT-10
- Ford Thunderbird
- Infiniti Q45
- Jeep Liberty
- Lexus SC430
- Mercedes-Benz C-Class Wagon
- Nissan Sentra SE-R
- Subaru Impreza WRX
- Toyota Matrix

==== Concept car introductions ====
- BMW X-Coupe
- Chrysler Crossfire
- Cunningham C7
- Dodge Super 8 Hemi
- Honda Model X
- Infiniti FX45
- Jeep Willys
- Mitsubishi RPM 7000
- Nissan alpha-T
- Oldsmobile Alero, Aurora, Intrigue Zebra Show Vehicle
- Volkswagen Microbus
- Volvo ACC
- Volvo SCC

=== 2000 ===
==== Concept car introductions ====
- Dodge Viper GTS-R Concept
- Ford Equator
- Ford Think
- Ford 021C
- GMC Terradyne
- Honda Spocket
- Infiniti XVL Concept
- Isuzu VX-4
- Lexus Sport Coupe
- Mazda RX-8 Concept 1
- Mercedes-Benz Vision SLA
- Opel Zafira Snowtrekker

==== Production car introductions ====
- 2001 BMW M3
- 2001 Chevrolet Avalanche
- 2003 Chevrolet SSR
- 2001 Chrysler PT Cruiser
- 2001 Ford Escape
- 2001 Hummer H2
- 2001 Hyundai Santa Fe
- 2001 Lexus LS 430
- 2001 Mitsubishi Eclipse
- 2000 Nissan Sentra
- 2001 Pontiac Aztek
- 2001 Porsche 996 Turbo
- 2001 Toyota Prius
- 2001 Toyota Sequoia
- 2001 Volvo V70 XC

=== 1999 ===
==== Concept car introductions ====
- Cadillac Evoq
- Chevrolet Nomad concept
- Dodge Charger concept
- Ford Thunderbird
- Jeep Commander concept
- Lincoln Blackwood
- Mercedes-Benz Vision SLR concept
- Mercury My concept
- Nissan 240Z concept
- Oldsmobile Recon
- Pontiac Aztek concept
- Pontiac GTO concept

=== 1998 ===
==== Production car introductions ====
- Aston Martin DB7 "Alfred Dunhill"
- Chrysler 300M
- Chrysler LHS
- Dodge Dakota R/T Club Cab
- Dodge Dakota R/T Regular Cab
- Ford Ranger
- Ford NASCAR Taurus
- GMC Jimmy 5-door
- GMC Yukon Denali
- Isuzu Amigo
- Isuzu Rodeo
- Isuzu Trooper
- Lexus RX300
- Mercedes-Benz ML430
- Mercedes-Benz CLK430
- Jeep Grand Cherokee
- Oldsmobile Alero
- Pontiac Grand Am
- Saab 9-3
- Subaru Legacy SUS
- Toyota Camry Solara Coupe
- Volkswagen New Beetle

==== Concept car introductions ====
- Aston Martin Project Vantage
- Dodge TekQua
- Dodge Big Red Truck
- Dodge Intrepid ESX2
- Buick Signia
- Chevrolet Monte Carlo Intimidator
- Chevrolet Guts Truck
- Chevrolet Silverado Show Truck
- Chrysler Chronos
- Jeep Jeepster
- Mitsubishi SST
- Oldsmobile Bravada X-Scape
- Plymouth Pronto Spyder
- Pontiac Montana Thunder
- Ford P2000 DIATA
- Ford Alpe Limited
- Ford Courier F1
- General Motors EV1 parallel hybrid
- General Motors EV1 CNG
- General Motors EV1 fuel cell
- General Motors EV1 Electric
- Mobility Outfitters Gear Box Concept
- GMC Sierra ACE Show Truck
- Acura TL-X Concept
- Audi Allroad Quattro Concept
- Honda MV-99
- BMW R1200C Sidecar Concept
- Suzuki SUP-1
- Karmann AFB Concept

=== 1997 ===
==== Production car introductions ====
- 1997 Chevrolet Corvette C5
- 1998 Chrysler Concorde
- 1998 Dodge Durango
- 1998 Dodge Intrepid
- 1998 Ford Escort ZX2
- 1998 Mercedes-Benz CLK
- 1998 Subaru Forester
- 1998 Toyota Sienna
- 1998 Volvo C70 convertible

==== Concept car introductions ====
- CCS Solstice
- Chrysler Phaeton
- Dodge Copperhead
- Ford Tremor
- Hyundai Tiburon Convertible Concept
- Jeep Dakar
- Jeep Icon
- Karmann Open View
- Lexus HPS
- Mercury MC4
- Oldsmobile Alero Alpha Concept
- Plymouth Pronto
- Pontiac Rageous
- Volkswagen Coupe Study CJ

=== 1996 ===
==== Concept car introductions ====
- Ford Indigo
- Ford Synergy 2010
- Lincoln Sentinel

=== 1995 ===
This edition featured 52 new vehicles, including 39 worldwide introductions.

==== Production car introductions ====
- AM General Hummer H1
- Acura NSX-T
- BMW 740iL
- Dodge Viper RT/10
- Dodge Caravan
- Cadillac Eldorado
- Chrysler Town & Country
- Chrysler Voyager
- Chrysler Grand Voyager
- Eagle Vision TSi "Autostick"
- GMC Yukon
- Gillet Vertigo
- Jeep Grand Cherokee Orvis
- Land Rover Defender 90
- Lincoln Mark VIII LSC
- Ford Taurus
- Ford Explorer
- Mercury Sable
- Mercury Mystique "Young America" Edition
- Hyundai Accent
- Lamborghini Diablo VT Roadster
- Oldsmobile Bravada
- Plymouth Voyager
- Suzuki Esteem GL
- Suzuki Esteem GLX
- Suzuki Sidekick Sport
- Toyota T100 XtraCab

==== Concept car introductions ====
- Acura CL-X
- Buick XP2000
- Chrysler Atlantic Concept
- Dodge Avenger RT Concept
- Eagle Jazz Concept
- Ford GT90
- Ford Triton Concept
- Ford Windstar SHO-Star Concept
- Hyundai HCD-III
- Lincoln L2K Concept
- Oldsmobile Antares Concept
- Plymouth Backpack
- Pontiac Grand Prix 300GPX Concept

=== 1994 ===
==== Production car introductions ====
- Acura Integra
- Acura Legend GS
- Audi Cabriolet (facelift)
- BMW 325i Cabrio
- Buick Riviera
- Cadillac DeVille
- Chevrolet Camaro Convertible
- Chevrolet Lumina
- Chevrolet Monte Carlo
- Chrysler Cirrus
- Chrysler New Yorker
- Chrysler LHS
- Dodge Stealth
- Dodge Stratus
- Dodge Viper GTS
- Ford Aspire
- Ford Mustang (facelift)
- Ford Thunderbird (facelift)
- Ford Cougar (facelift)
- Ford Windstar
- GMC Jimmy
- Honda Accord
- Hyundai Elantra (facelift)
- Hyundai Sonata
- Infiniti G20t
- Isuzu Trooper SE
- Isuzu Rodeo (facelift)
- Lincoln Continental
- Mazda Millenia
- Mercedes-Benz C220
- Mercedes-Benz C280
- Oldsmobile Aurora
- Pontiac TransSport (facelift)
- Porsche 911 Carrera
- Saab 900
- Toyota Celica

==== Concept car introductions ====
- ASC GMC Sunoma
- ASC Chrysler 300
- ASC Crown Victoria LSS
- Cadillac LSE
- Chrysler Aviat
- Dodge Venom
- Eagle Vision Aerie
- Ford Ranger Sea Splash
- Ford Powerstroke (Power Stroke)
- Lincoln Contempra
- Mercury Premys
- Plymouth Expresso
- Pontiac Sunfire Speedster
- Volkswagen Concept 1

=== 1993 ===
==== Production car introductions ====
- BMW 325is
- BMW 5 Series
- Chevrolet Camaro Z28 Coupe
- Chevrolet Camaro Z28 Indy 500 Pace Car
- Chevrolet Impala SS
- Chrysler LHS
- Chrysler New Yorker
- Dodge Ram 1500
- Ford Explorer Limited
- Lincoln Mark VIII
- Mitsubishi Galant
- Subaru Impreza
- Toyota T100
- Volkswagen Jetta GLX

==== Concept car introductions ====
- Cadillac Seville Coupe Concept by ASC
- Chevrolet Highlander Concept
- Chevrolet Corvette LT-1 Spyder by ASC
- Chevrolet Bass Sport Concept
- Chrysler Thunderbolt Concept
- Chrysler Patriot Concept
- Dodge Ram Sport V10 Concept
- Ford Ranger Open-Air Flare Concept by ASC
- GMC Santa Fe Concept
- Hyundai HCD-II Epoch Concept
- Jeep ECCO
- Mazda Cubist
- Mercedes-Benz "Panorama Roof" SL Concept
- Mercury Villager Nautica Concept
- Plymouth Prowler Concept
- Porsche Boxster Concept
- Pontiac Grand Prix GTP Concept
- Saturn Coupe + Roadster Concept by ASC

=== 1992 ===
==== Production car introductions ====
- Audi 100CS Quattro
- Audi Cabriolet
- BMW E36 3 Series coupes
- Chrysler Concorde
- Chrysler New Yorker
- Dodge Intrepid
- Eagle Vision
- Cadillac Allanté
- Cadillac Allanté Pace Car
- Jeep Grand Cherokee
- Mercedes-Benz S600 Coupe
- Honda Civic CRX
- Mazda MX-6
- Toyota Camry SE
- Porsche 911 Carrera RS America
- Saturn SW
- Lamborghini LM American

==== Concept car introductions ====
- Buick Sceptre
- Chevrolet Lumina Sizigi Concept
- Chevrolet Corvette Sting Ray III Concept
- Chrysler Cirrus Concept
- Dodge EPIC
- Ford Connecta (Ghia)
- Ford F-150 SuperFlare Concept
- General Motors Ultralite
- Hyundai HCD-1
- Lincoln Marque X
- Oldsmobile Anthem
- Pontiac Salsa
- Pontiac Salsa Sport

=== 1991 ===
- Chevrolet Corvette ZR-1 Spyder Concept
- Mercedes-Benz F100

=== 1990 ===
The 1990 Detroit Auto Show was held on January 6–14.

==== Concept car introductions ====
- Acura NSX
- ASC Vision II
- Buick Bolero
- Buick Park Avenue
- Cadillac Aurora
- Chevrolet Corvette CERV III
- C&C LSV
- C&C Tresaire
- Dodge Daytona R/T
- Dodge LRT
- Eagle Optima
- Ford Surf
- Geo Tracker Hugger
- GM Micro Concept
- GMC Mahalo
- Jeep Freedom
- Jeep Rubicon Wrangler
- Mercury Cyclone
- Nissan Gobi
- Oldsmobile Expression
- Plymouth Voyager 3
- Pontiac Sunfire

=== 1989 ===
The Detroit Auto Show was renamed the North American International Auto Show for 1989, as Lexus and Infiniti debuted. The show opened on January 11, with press previews and introductions for the first two days.

==== Production car introductions ====
- Audi V8
- Chevrolet Lumina
- Chevrolet Lumina APV
- Chevrolet Corvette ZR-1
- Chrysler LeBaron GT
- Chrysler Town & Country
- Dodge Dakota convertible
- Geo Prizm
- Geo Storm
- Infiniti Q45
- Lexus LS400
- Lotus Esprit Turbo
- Mazda MPV
- Mitsubishi Eclipse
- Plymouth Laser
- Porsche 911 Carrera 4 and Speedster
- Porsche 944 S2 Cabriolet
- Shelby Dakota
- Shelby CSX-VNT
- Volkswagen Corrado

==== Concept car introductions ====
- Chevrolet PPG XT-2
- Chrysler Millennium
- Chrysler PPG Le Baron Pace Car
- Dodge Viper VM-01
- Ford Splash
- Magna Torrero
- Mercury Concept 50
- Oldsmobile Aerotech II
- Oldsmobile Aerotech III
- Plymouth Speedster
- Pontiac Stinger

=== 1987 ===
The 1987 show ran from January 10 to 18.

==== Production models introductions ====
- Cadillac Allanté

==== Concept cars introductions ====
- Dodge Daytona 199x
- Pontiac Pursuit
- Chevrolet Express Concept
- Oldsmobile Aerotech I Long Tail
- Oldsmobile Aerotech I Short Tail

== Awards ==
Two major awards are presented at the auto show: the EyesOn Design Awards for Design Excellence, and the Car, Truck, and Utility of the Year Award, which was founded in 1994. At the North American Car, Truck and Utility Vehicle of the Year awards, awarded in the preview period of the auto show, around 55 automotive journalists serve as judges. They evaluate "value, innovation, design, performance, safety, technology and driver satisfaction."

EyesOn Design Award winners

- 2004: Winners were the Mazda Kabura concept for "Aesthetics & Innovation", the Ferrari FXX prototype for "Functionality", and the Chevrolet Camaro (fifth generation) model for "Concept Implementation".
- 2007: Winners were the 2007 Chrysler Nassau concept for "Aesthetics & Innovation", the Kia Kue concept for "Functionality", the 2008 Cadillac CTS (second generation) production model for "Concept Implementation", and the Jeep Trailhawk concept for "Spirit of Industrial Design".
- 2008: The Cadillac CTS concept and the Chrysler ecoVoyager won the awards for concept car and truck. The 2009 Cadillac CTS-V and the BMW X6 received the Design Excellence awards for best production car and truck.
- 2009: The Audi Sportback and the Cadillac Converj (ELR) won the "Excellence in Design Award" for concept vehicles debuted at the Detroit. The Audi R8 V10 and the BMW Z4 (E89) received the Design Excellence award for production vehicles.
- 2010: The GMC Granite won the Excellence in Design Award for concept vehicles debuted at the Detroit show and the Audi A8 received the top honor for production vehicles.
- 2011: The Porsche 918 RSR won for concept vehicles debuted at the Detroit show and the 2011 Audi A6 received the award for production vehicles.
- 2012: The Lexus LF-LC won the "Excellence in Design Award" for concept vehicles debuted at the Detroit show and the 2013 Ford Fusion received the top honor for production vehicles.
- 2013: The 2014 Cadillac ELR won the "Production Category" at the Detroit show while the Nissan Resonance concept and the Ford Atlas concept tied for the "Concept Category" award.
- 2014: The 2015 Ford Mustang won "Best Production Vehicle" while the Volvo Concept XC Coupé took awards for both "Best Concept Vehicle" and "Best Use of Color, Graphics, and Materials".
- 2015: The Ford GT won "Best Designed Production Vehicle" award while the Buick Avenir was selected as both "Best Concept Vehicle" and "Best Use of Color, Graphics, and Materials" and the Audi Q7 received Best Designed Interior.
