= Maserati Kubang GT Wagon =

Overview
- Manufacturer: Maserati
- Production: 2003 (Concept car)
- Assembly: Italy
- Designer: Giorgetto Giugiaro at Italdesign

Body and chassis
- Class: Mid-size luxury crossover SUV
- Body style: 5-door SUV
- Layout: F4 layout
- Platform: Audi A8
- Related: Maserati Kubang, Maserati Levante

Powertrain
- Engine: 3.2 L AM 585 V8 (twin-turbocharged petrol)
- Transmission: 6-speed automated manual

Dimensions
- Length: 4,984 mm (196.2 in)
- Width: 1,942 mm (76.5 in)
- Height: 1,650 mm (65.0 in)

Chronology
- Successor: Maserati Kubang

The Maserati Kubang GT Wagon is a 2003 concept car unveiled at the Detroit Auto Show. Designed by Italdesign Giugiaro, it was presented under the Maserati brand which was then owned by Ferrari. In accordance with Maserati's naming tradition, the Kubang is named after a Javanese wind.

== Development ==
The Kubang GT was developed using the floorplan of the Audi A8, and Maserati hoped for it to be produced in collaboration with Audi. It was designed to use the 90° V8 engine from the Maserati 3200 GT, producing 368 hp (274 kW) at 6250 rpm. Due to the agreement with Audi never being sealed, the Kubang GT was never developed past the concept stage. In 2011, Maserati built the Kubang concept as an evolution of the GT Wagon.

== Features ==
Alongside sporty characteristics such as a 48/52% weight distribution and a low center of gravity, the GT Wagon featured a modular interior design. The interior accommodated 5 occupants (2 front seats + a rear bench seat), or 4 occupants in the “Executive” configuration. The interior could also be fitted with a third row of seats.
