= Kubang =

Kubang may refer to:

- Kubang Kerian, a town in Malaysia
- Kubang Pasu, a district in Malaysia
- Maserati Kubang, a crossover SUV
