= Kia Kue =

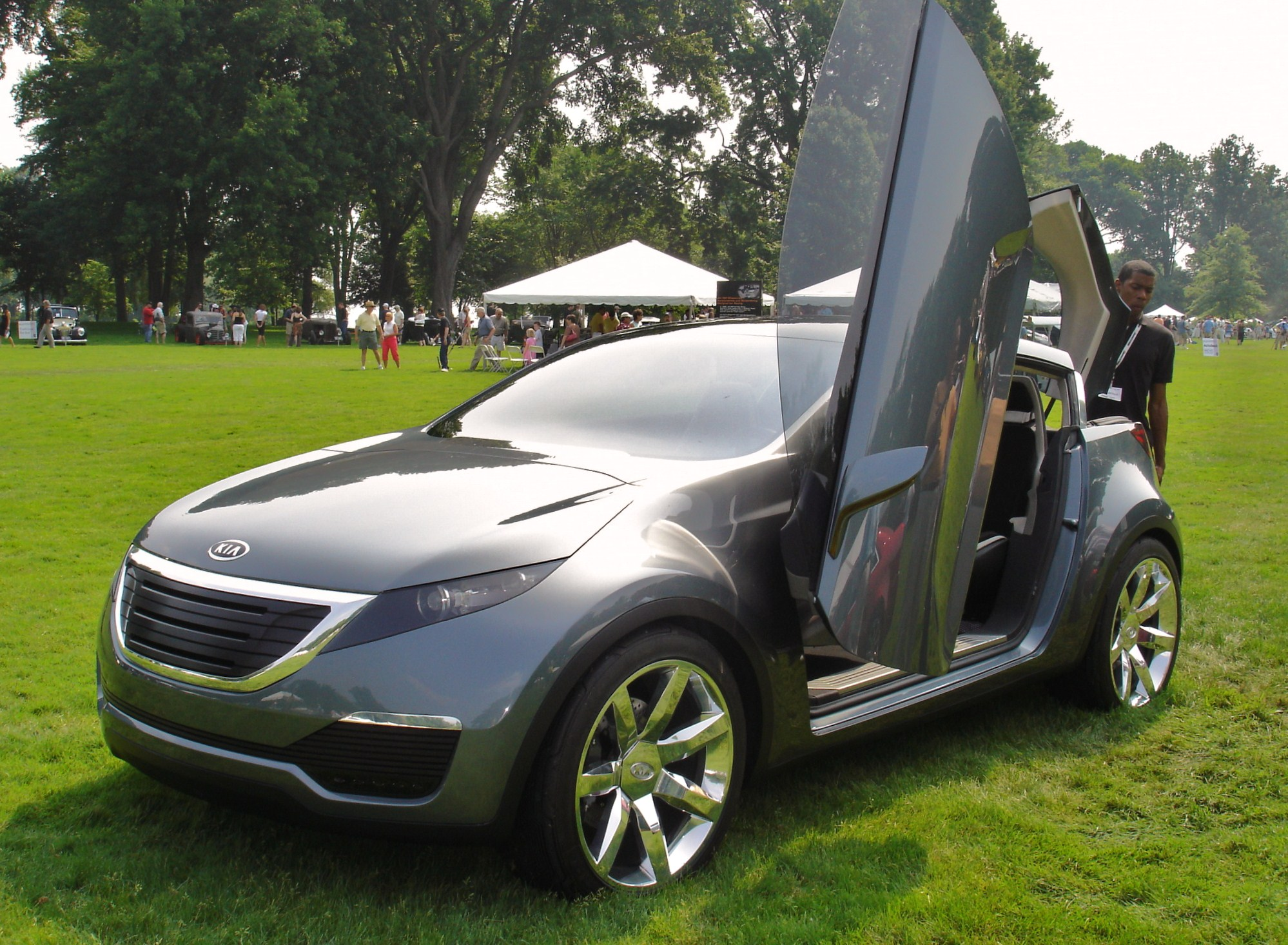

Overview
- Manufacturer: Kia Motors
- Production: 2007 (Concept car)

Body and chassis
- Class: Mid-size crossover SUV
- Body style: 3-door SUV
- Layout: Front-engine, all-wheel-drive
- Doors: Scissor doors
- Related: Hyundai Santa Fe; Hyundai Veracruz; Kia Sorento

Powertrain
- Engine: 4.6L 400 hp (300 kW) V8
- Transmission: 5-speed automatic

Dimensions
- Wheelbase: 114.2 in (2,901 mm)
- Length: 186 in (4,724 mm)
- Width: 75.9 in (1,928 mm)
- Height: 63 in (1,600 mm)

The Kia Kue was a concept crossover SUV introduced during the 2007 North American International Auto Show in Detroit. It was similar in design to the Hyundai Santa Fe platform, and it may also share the same platform used by the Hyundai Santa Fe and Veracruz in that it, like the Santa Fe, it was designed as a crossover SUV. The concept vehicle seated five passengers.

The Kia Kue was the first car to win a Design Award for a Korean company. This concept was awarded with "Eyes on Design Award" for Design Excellence at the 2007 Detroit Auto Show.

The Kue was designed, in part, was to distinguish itself from Hyundai's cars, according to then-US president of Kia Motors, Len Hunt. It only had only two doors, which open scissor style to allow access to all 4 seats. The concept car also boasted a 400-hp, 4.6-liter V8 engine.

The Kue concept eventually went into production as the second-generation Kia Sorento, the first Kia model manufactured in the United States. Some styling cues of the Kue were also used in the third-generation Kia Sportage

== See also ==
- Kia Sorento, the mid-size crossover SUV of the manufacturer
