= Chrysler Nassau =

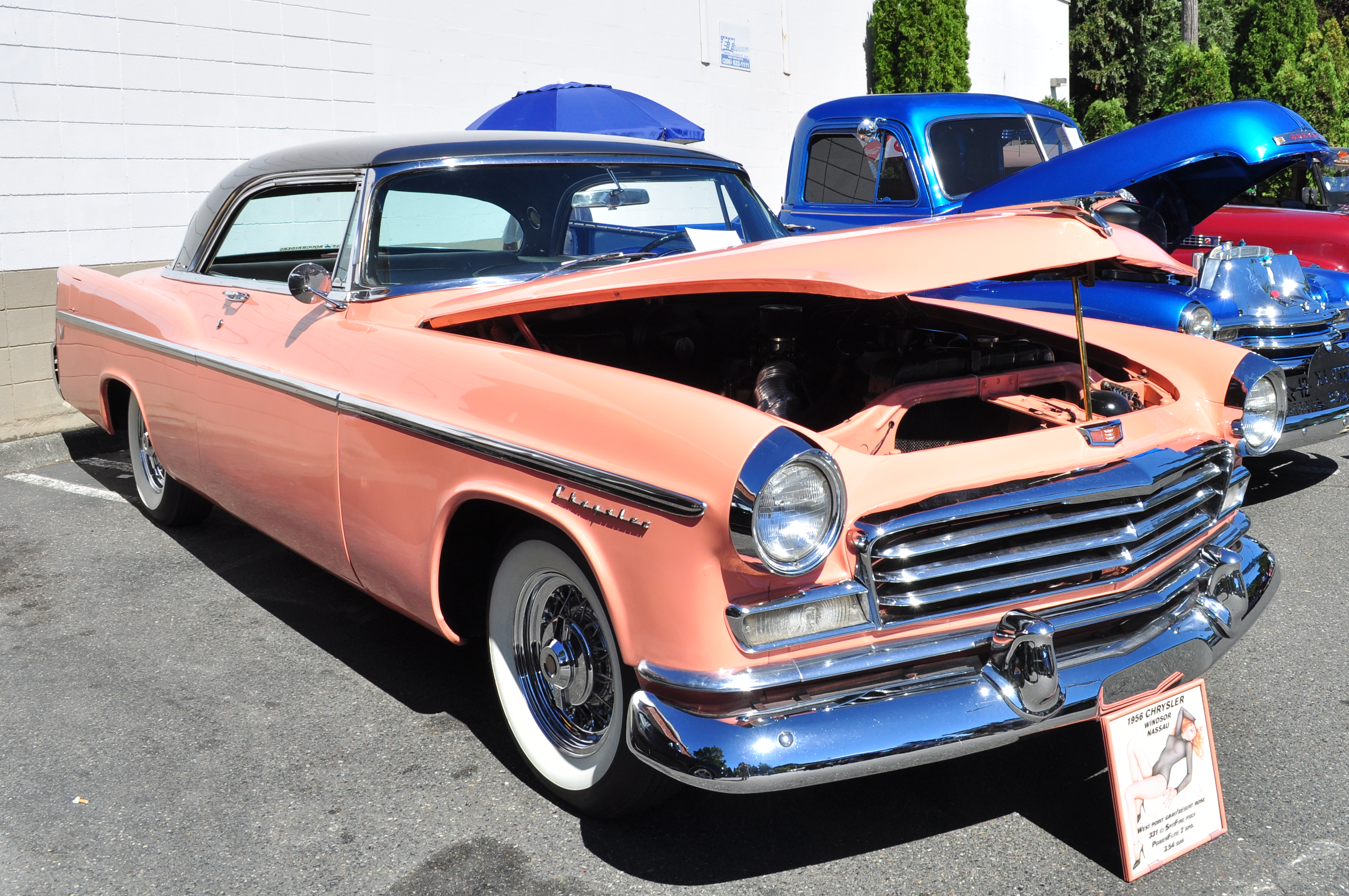
1956 Chrysler Windsor Nassau

Nassau is the name used by several vehicles made by Chrysler. The name was first used as a trim level in 1955, denoting the least expensive two-door hardtop offered by Chrysler, which was part of the Chrysler Windsor series.

More recently, two different concepts by the manufacturer bear the Nassau nameplate.

== 2000 Nassau ==
The first Chrysler Nassau concept was a styling exercise penned in 2000 by Chrysler designer Robert Hubbach. The resulting vehicle became a working model used by engineers and stylists to eventually create the Chrysler 300 sedan, introduced in 2005. As with many recent models from Chrysler, very few exterior details were lost in the translation from concept car to production vehicle. One notable exterior difference between the Nassau and 300 are taillamps that wrap over the rear fenders, similar to the treatment on Cadillac CTS sport sedan.

The 2000 Nassau styling mule was housed in the Walter P. Chrysler Museum before the museum's permanent closure in 2016.

== 2007 Nassau ==
2007 Chrysler Nassau Concept
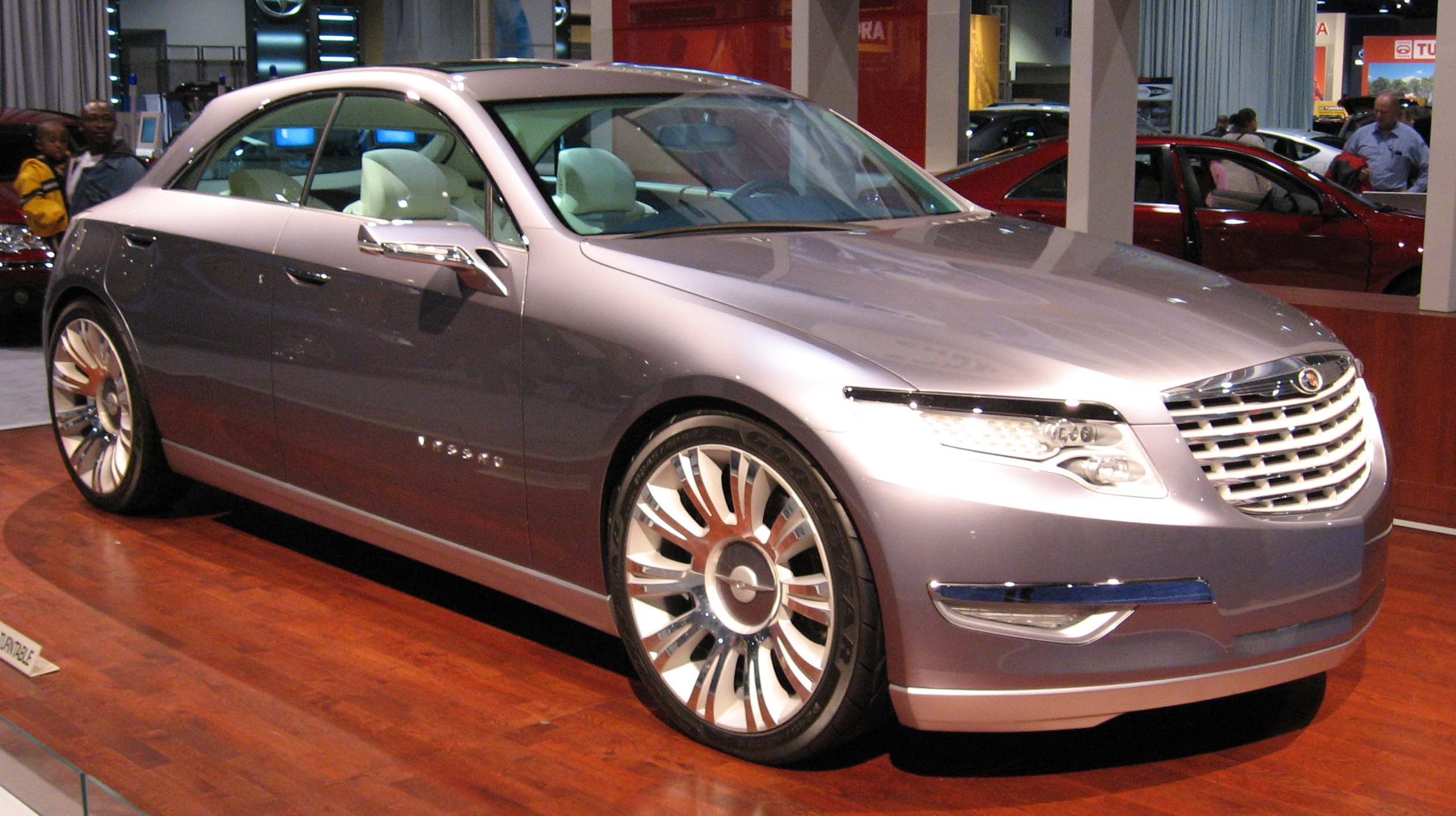

Overview
- Manufacturer: Chrysler (DaimlerChrysler)
- Designer: Alan Barrington; Ben Chang

Body and chassis
- Class: Full-size car
- Body style: 4-door shooting-brake
- Layout: FR layout
- Platform: Chrysler LX platform
- Related: Chrysler 300; Dodge Charger

Powertrain
- Engine: 6.1L Chrysler Hemi V8
- Transmission: 5-speed automatic

Dimensions
- Wheelbase: 120 in (3,048.0 mm)
- Length: 196.1 in (4,981 mm)
- Width: 74.2 in (1,885 mm)
- Height: 58.9 in (1,496 mm)

In late 2006, DaimlerChrysler announced that it would show another concept car carrying the Nassau name, this time at the 2007 North American International Auto Show. Described by Chrysler as a 'four-door coupe' (however, it is a shooting-brake), it was speculated to be a design exploration for the next-generation Chrysler 300 and Dodge Magnum. The concept was equipped with a 425 hp (315 kW) 6.1 L V8. It was designed in Chrysler's Pacifica Advanced Design Studio in southern California by Alan Barrington (exterior) and Ben Chang (interior).
