= Cunningham C7 =

Overview
- Production: 2001
- Designer: Stewart Reed

Body and chassis
- Body style: Grand tourer

The Cunningham C7 was a concept car first shown at the 2001 Detroit Motor Show. The C7 was a grand tourer designed as a modern interpretation of the Cunningham C-4R from the 1950s.

== Description ==
In 1999, a partnership was formed between former Chrysler chairman Bob Lutz and Briggs Cunningham III (son of Briggs Cunningham II), with the intention of reviving the B.S. Cunningham Company.

Designed by Stewart Reed, the C7 was revealed at the 2001 Detroit Motor Show, with styling reminiscent of the 1952 Cunningham C4-R race car. The C7 was planned to use a 6.8 litre, 600 horsepower, V12 engine from General Motors, also featuring carbon fibre or aluminium bodywork and all wheel drive. Production plans included manufacturing 500-600 cars per year, priced at $250,000, with production handled by Roush Industries.

Internal conflict within the company, including a lawsuit filed by Cunningham against Lutz and General Motors bought the project to a halt and the C7 was not produced. The fibreglass concept model is currently owned by Jack Roush as part of his private collection.
