= Volkswagen Cross Coupe GTE Concept =

Volkswagen GTE Concept

Overview
- Manufacturer: Volkswagen

Body and chassis
- Class: Mid-size luxury crossover SUV
- Body style: 5 door, 5 seater SUV
- Layout: four wheel drive, gasoline engine powers front wheels. Rear wheels driven by electric motors.
- Platform: MQB

Powertrain
- Engine: 276 HP 3.6 litre VR6, plus two electric motors.
- Electric motor: 2x AC permanent-magnet synchronous electric motor: Front: 40 kW (54.4 PS; 53.6 hp); Rear: 85 kW (115.6 PS; 114.0 hp); Total: 125 kW (170.0 PS; 167.6 hp)
- Power output: 261 kW (354.9 PS; 350.0 hp) (Combined)
- Transmission: 6 speed dual clutch DSG transmission
- Hybrid drivetrain: PHEV
- Battery: 14.1 kWh Li-ion

Dimensions
- Wheelbase: 2,650 mm (104.3 in)
- Length: 190.8 Inch.
- Width: 79.9 Inch
- Height: 68.3 Inch
- Curb weight: 1,850kg

== Overview ==
The Cross Coupé GTE is a plug in hybrid with four wheel drive. The Cross Coupé GTE is the third concept car shown by Volkswagen Passenger Cars in the run up to the introduction of the production version.

Together, all three concept cars – the CrossBlue presented in Detroit in January 2013, the seven seat CrossBlue Coupé shown in Los Angeles in November 2013, and the Cross Coupé GTE shown at the 2015 North American International Auto Show, it represents the versatility of using Volkswagen's MQB Platform, and is aimed at the market in the United States.

== Specifications ==
The Volkswagen Cross Coupe GTE features gesture recognition which is almost identical to the Volkswagen Golf R Touch concept that was shown at the Consumer Electronics Show in Las Vegas, this system will come out in around five years. The Volkswagen Cross Coupe GTE's gas powered V6 engine and two electric motors produce a total of 355 horsepower and achieve an estimated 70 mpg-e.

The Cross Coupe GTE can drive approximately twenty miles on electric power alone. Once the lithium-ion battery pack is depleted, it can be recharged using the gasoline engine while driving, or by plugging it in. The gasoline engine only powers the front wheels. The rear wheels are driven by the electric motors.

== Performance ==
The Volkswagen Cross Coupe GTE is powered by a 3.6-litre VR6 gasoline engine and two electric motors. The six-cylinder direct-injection engine produces 276 horsepower and 258 lb-ft. The two electric motors produce 54 hp and 162 lb ft (front) and 114 hp and 199 lb ft (rear). They are powered by a lithium-ion battery, it is rated at 14.1 kWh.

The total output of the drive is 355 hp and 280 lb ft; this is enough to power the Cross Coupe GTE to a top speed of 130 mph and accelerate from 0–60 mph in 6.0 seconds.
