= Jeep Trailhawk =

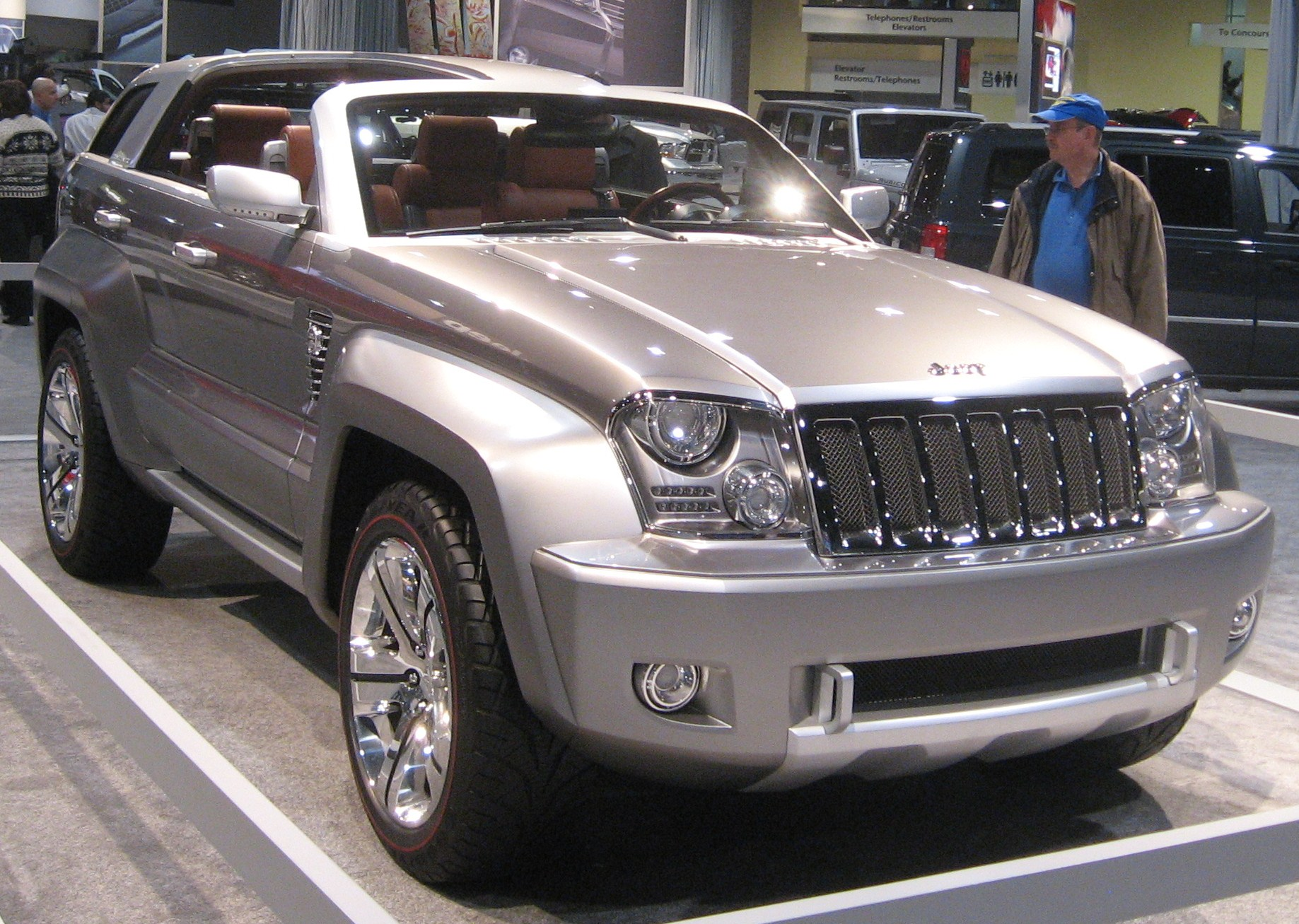

Overview
- Manufacturer: DaimlerChrysler

Body and chassis
- Class: Mid-size SUV
- Body style: 4-door SUV
- Layout: Front engine, rear-wheel drive / four-wheel drive
- Related: Jeep Wrangler

Powertrain
- Engine: 3.0 L 215 hp (160 kW) V6 Diesel

Dimensions
- Wheelbase: 116.0 in (2,946 mm)
- Length: 191.2 in (4,856 mm)
- Width: 77.7 in (1,974 mm)
- Height: 69.3 in (1,760 mm)
- Curb weight: 3,900 lb (1,769 kg) (est)

The Jeep Trailhawk is a mid-size concept SUV unveiled at the 2007 North American International Auto Show.

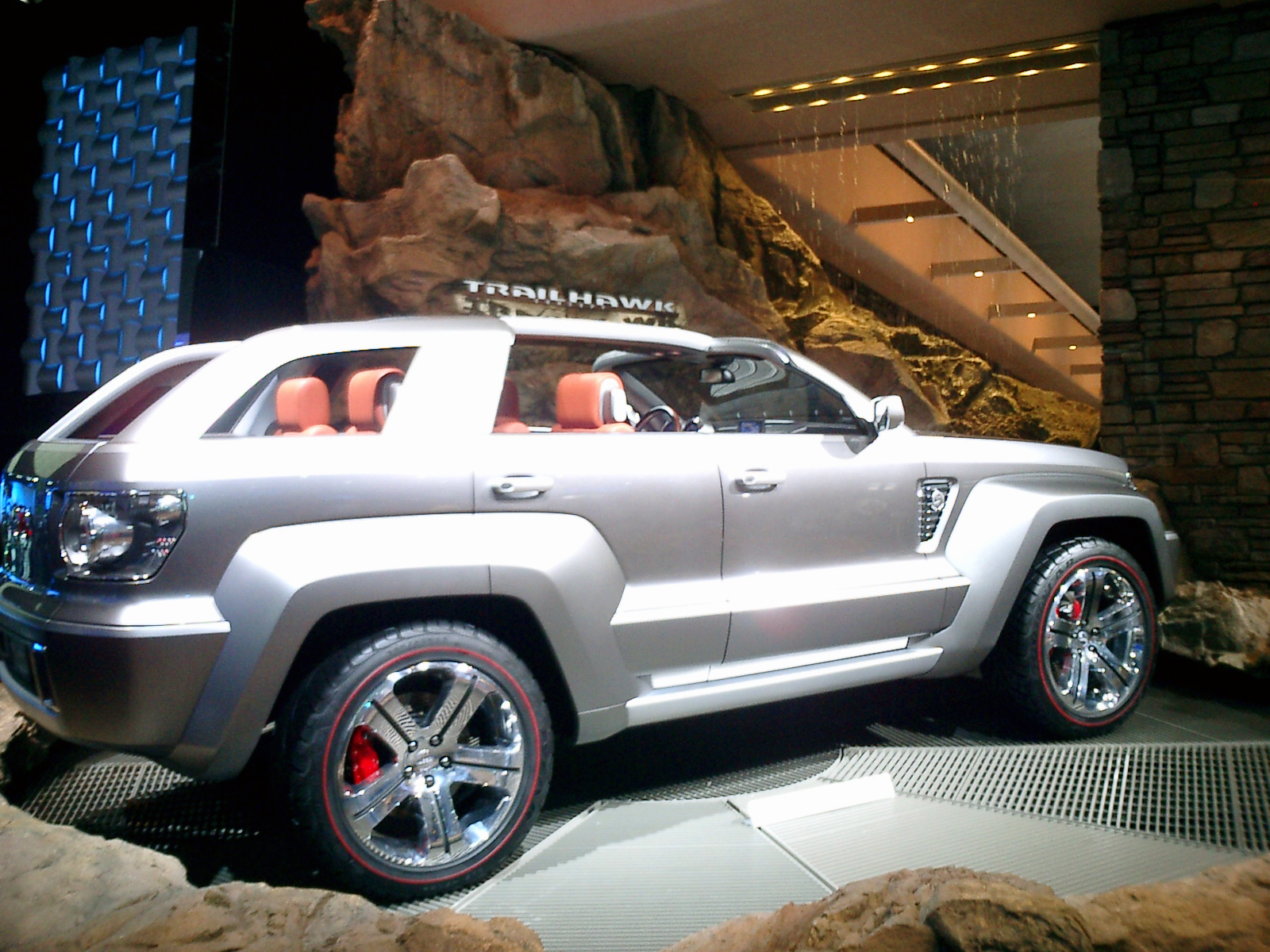
Rear view

The name Trailhawk was later used as a badge on other models in the Jeep lineup to designate a certain trim package.
