= Chrysler ecoVoyager =

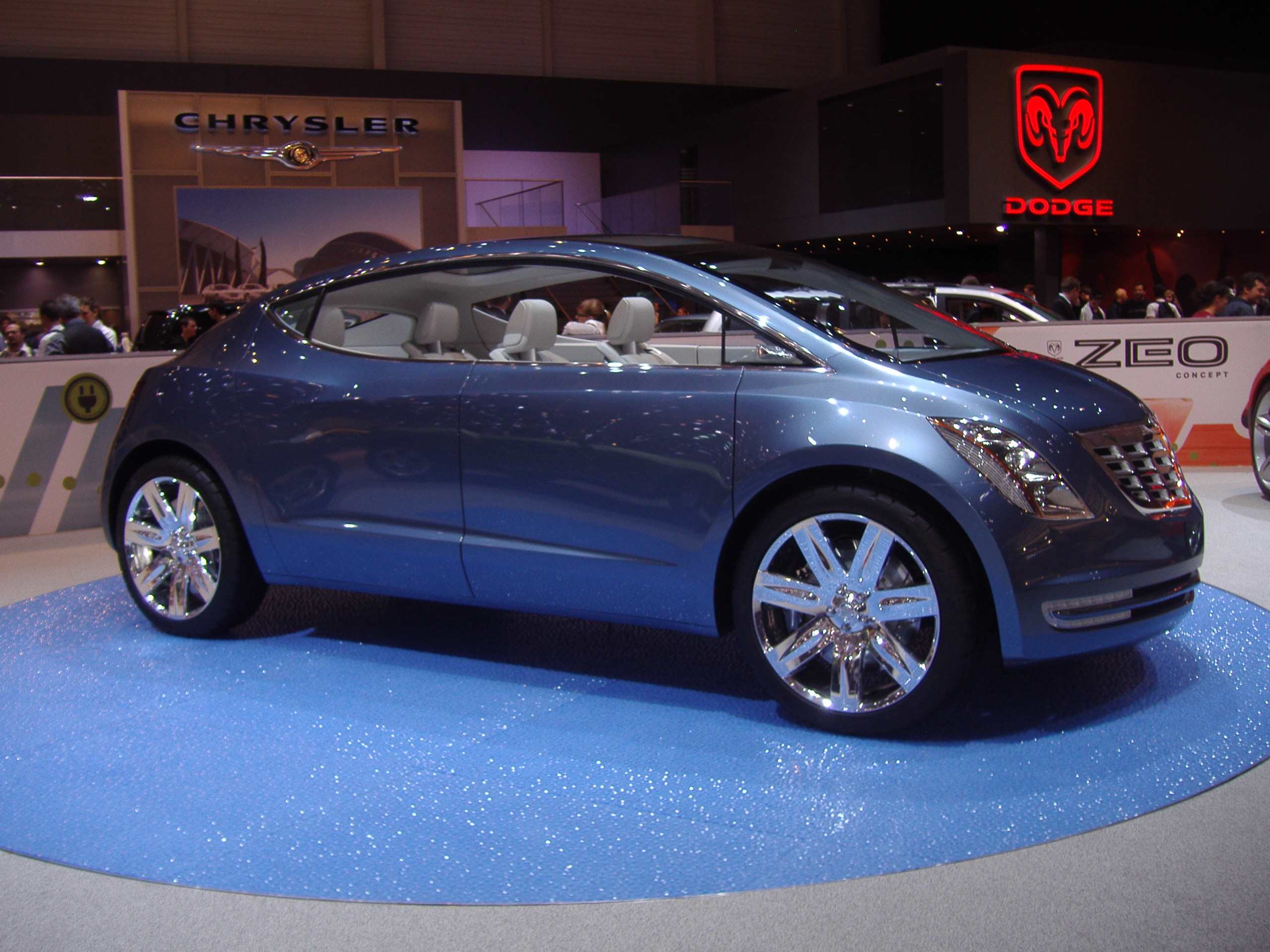

Overview
- Manufacturer: Chrysler LLC

Body and chassis
- Class: Concept car
- Body style: 5-door 4-seat Minivan
- Layout: Transverse front-engine, front-wheel drive
- Doors: Conventional doors (front); Coach Doors (rear)

Powertrain
- Engine: 45 kilowatts (61 metric horsepower; 60 horsepower) fuel cell range extender
- Electric motor: 200 kilowatts (272 metric horsepower; 268 horsepower) electric motor
- Transmission: 1-speed
- Hybrid drivetrain: Fuel cell-powered EREV
- Battery: Lithium-ion battery
- Range: 300 miles (483 kilometres)

Dimensions
- Wheelbase: 116 in (2,900 mm)
- Length: 191.2 in (4,860 mm)
- Width: 75.4 in (1,920 mm)
- Height: 63 in (1,600 mm)
- Curb weight: 2,750 lb (1,247 kg)

The Chrysler ecoVoyager was a concept car that was revealed on January 14, 2008, by Chrysler. It was introduced at the 2008 North American International Auto Show. The combination of a lithium-ion battery pack with an advanced hydrogen fuel cell was claimed to provide a range of 300 miles (483 kilometres).
