= Nissan IDx =

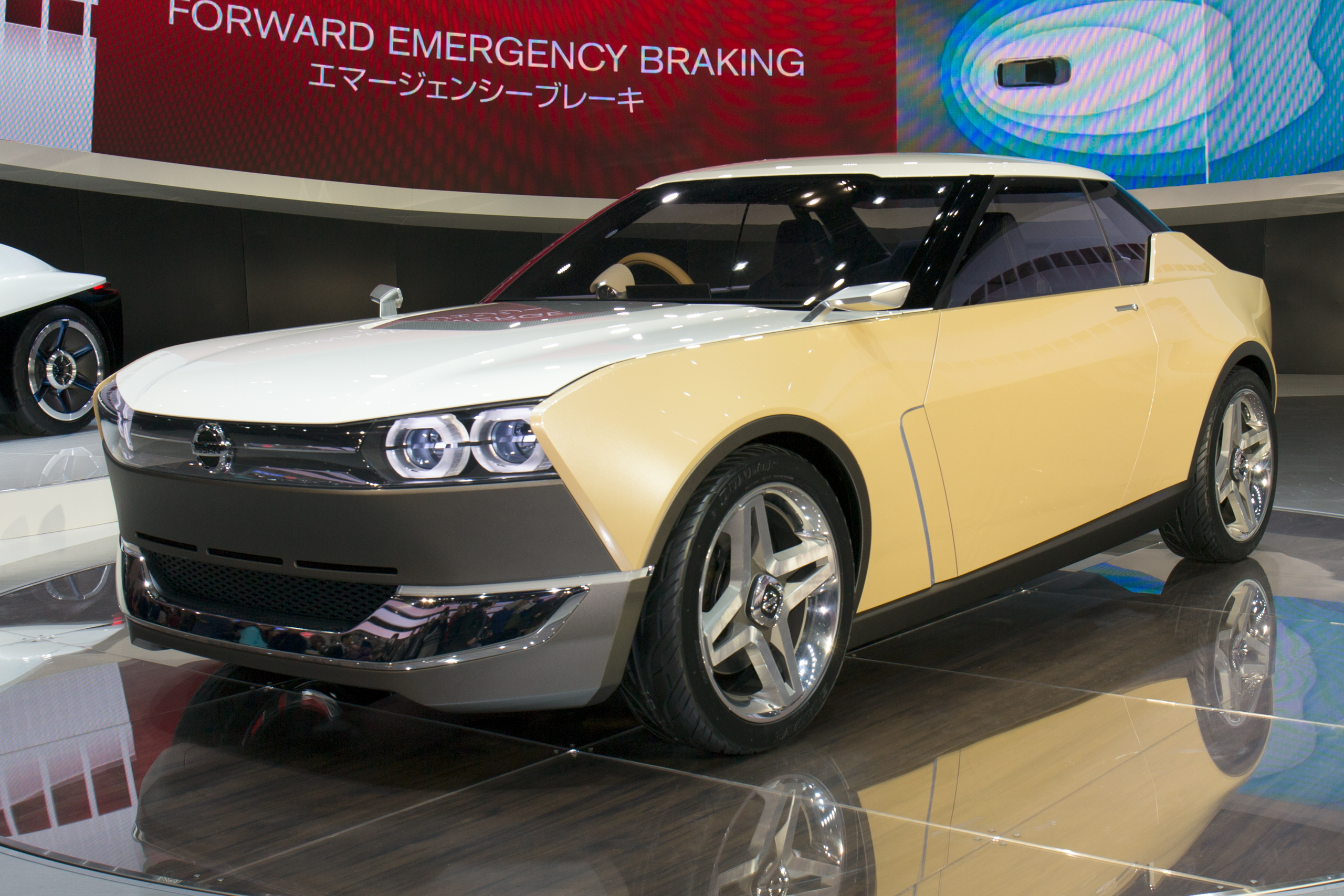
- Nissan IDx Freeflow at the 2013 Tokyo Motor Show

Overview
- Manufacturer: Nissan
- Also called: Nissan IDx Freeflow
- Production: 2013 (concept car)
- Designer: David Beasley / Nissan Design Europe + Global Nissan Design Center

Body and chassis
- Body style: 2-door coupé
- Layout: Front-engine RWD
- Related: IDx NISMO

Powertrain
- Engine: 1.2 L CR12DE I4; 1.5 L HR15DE I4; 1.6 L MR16DDT Turbo I4 (NISMO); 1.8 L MRA8DE I4
- Transmission: 6-speed manual CVT

Dimensions
- Length: 162.0 in (13.5 ft)
- Width: 67.2 in (5.6 ft); 70.8 in (5.9 ft)(NISMO)
- Height: 51.6 in (4.3 ft)
- Curb weight: 1,315 kg (2,900 lb)

Chronology
- Predecessor: Datsun 510 (spiritual)

The Nissan IDx is a concept car introduced at the 2013 Tokyo Motor Show by Nissan. It is supposedly inspired by the Datsun 510. The IDx is Nissan's answer to the "RWD tuner craze" that is ongoing and a direct competitor to the Hyundai Genesis coupe & Scion FRS/Subaru BRZ. The IDx is aimed at young buyers and racing gamers alike. A few quirks the car has that might not make production are the "side view mirrors" that are designed to be cameras rather than traditional mirrors as well as the side-exit exhaust. There is a possibility that Nissan is building more IDx concepts because there are numbers (003 and 004) instead of 001 and 002 on each of the concepts. With Nissan's looming decision to discontinue several current models such as the Quest, Xterra, Cube and possibly the Juke there is expected room in Nissan's lineup for a new entry-level sports car.

== Inspiration ==
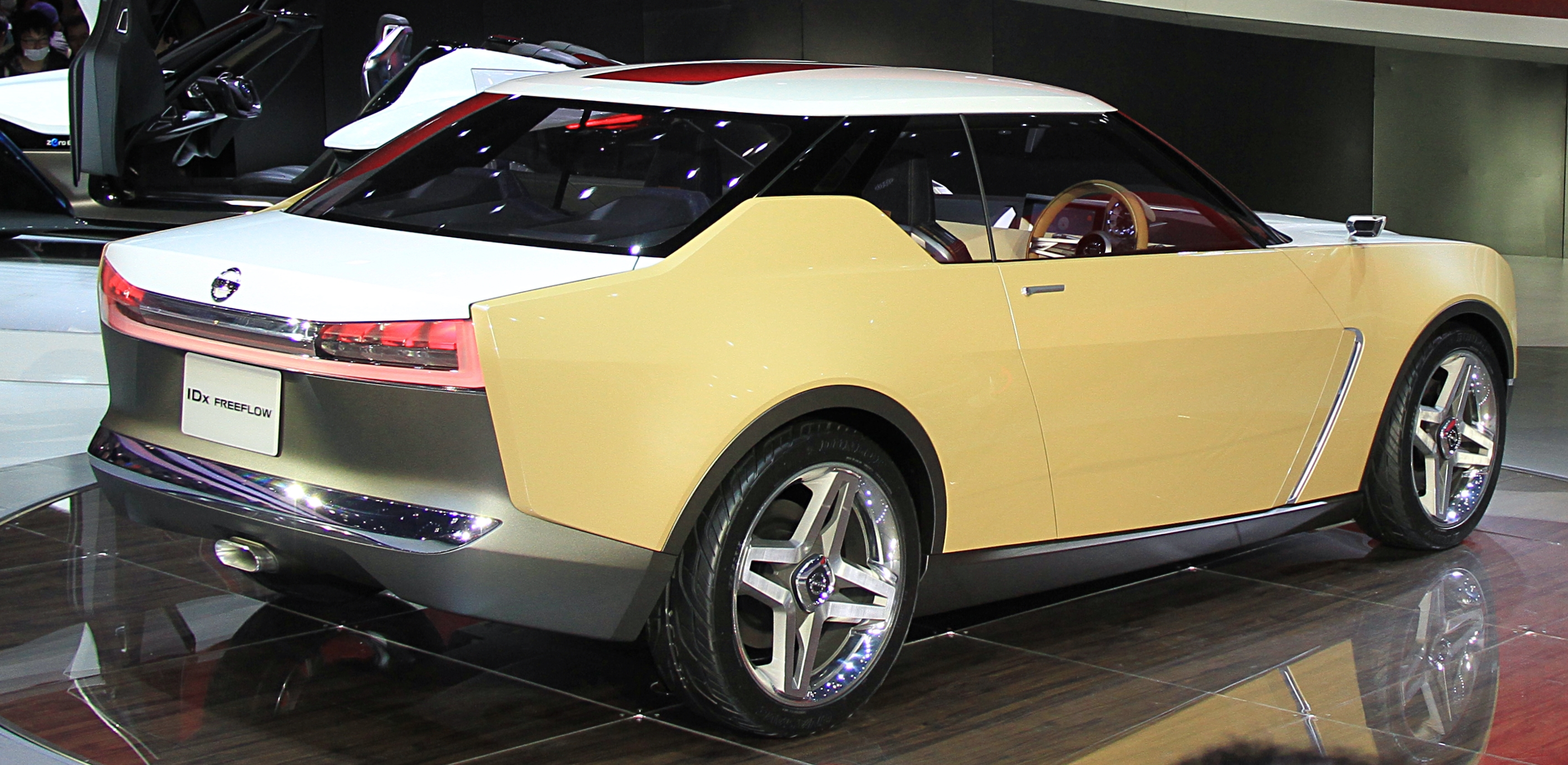
IDx Freeflow rear

Nissan claims the red interior of the NISMO variant was supposed to look like it "came directly from a driving simulator", while the Freeflow variant is inspired by blue jeans

== Naming ==
Nissan claims the name IDx means: "ID is the acronym taken from ‘identification,’ relating to the things all individuals relate to on a personal level in a car. The ‘x’ is the variable, representing the new values and dreams born through communication.” The 'D' and 'X' are also synonymous with the Roman numerals D, meaning 500, and X, meaning 10, possibly a nod to the Datsun model 510.

== IDx NISMO ==
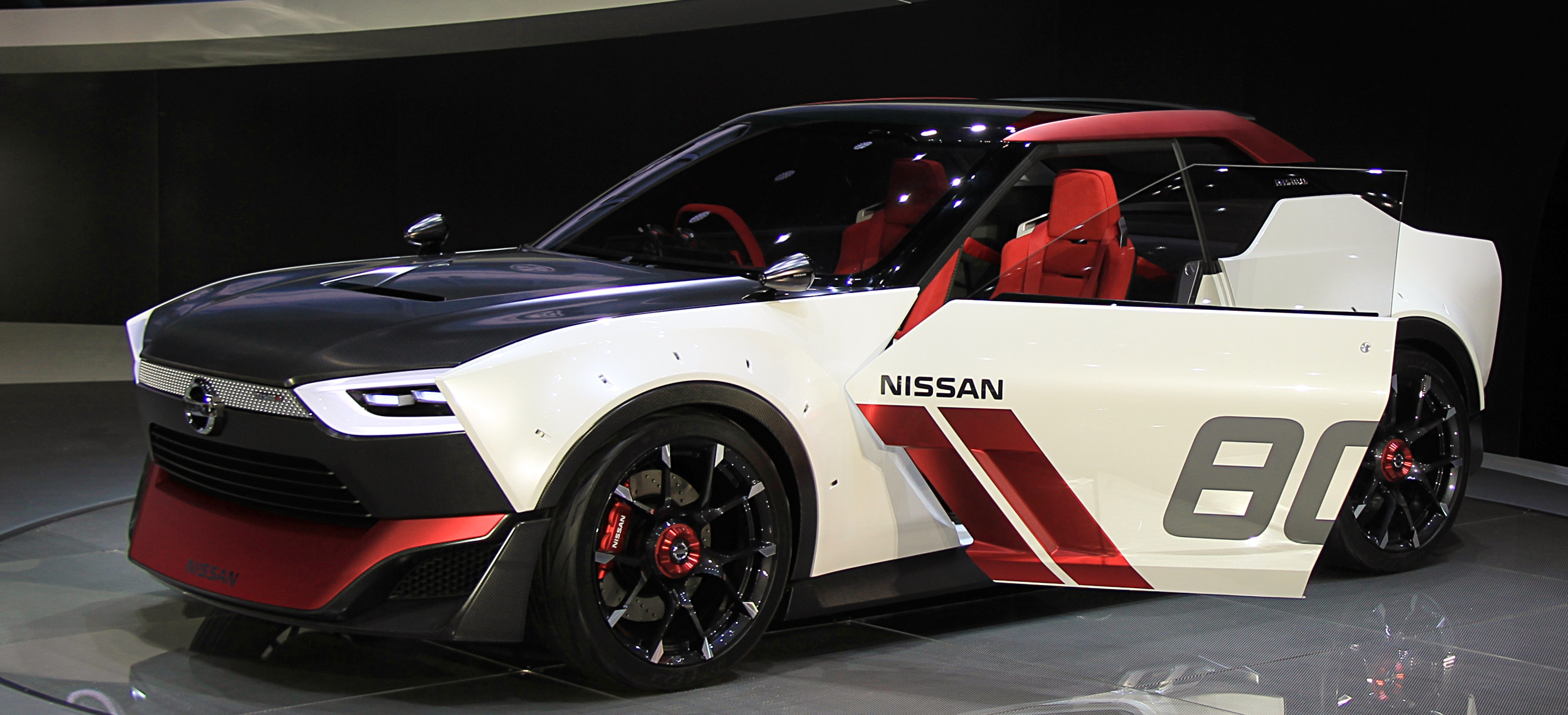
IDx NISMO at the 2013 Tokyo Motor Show

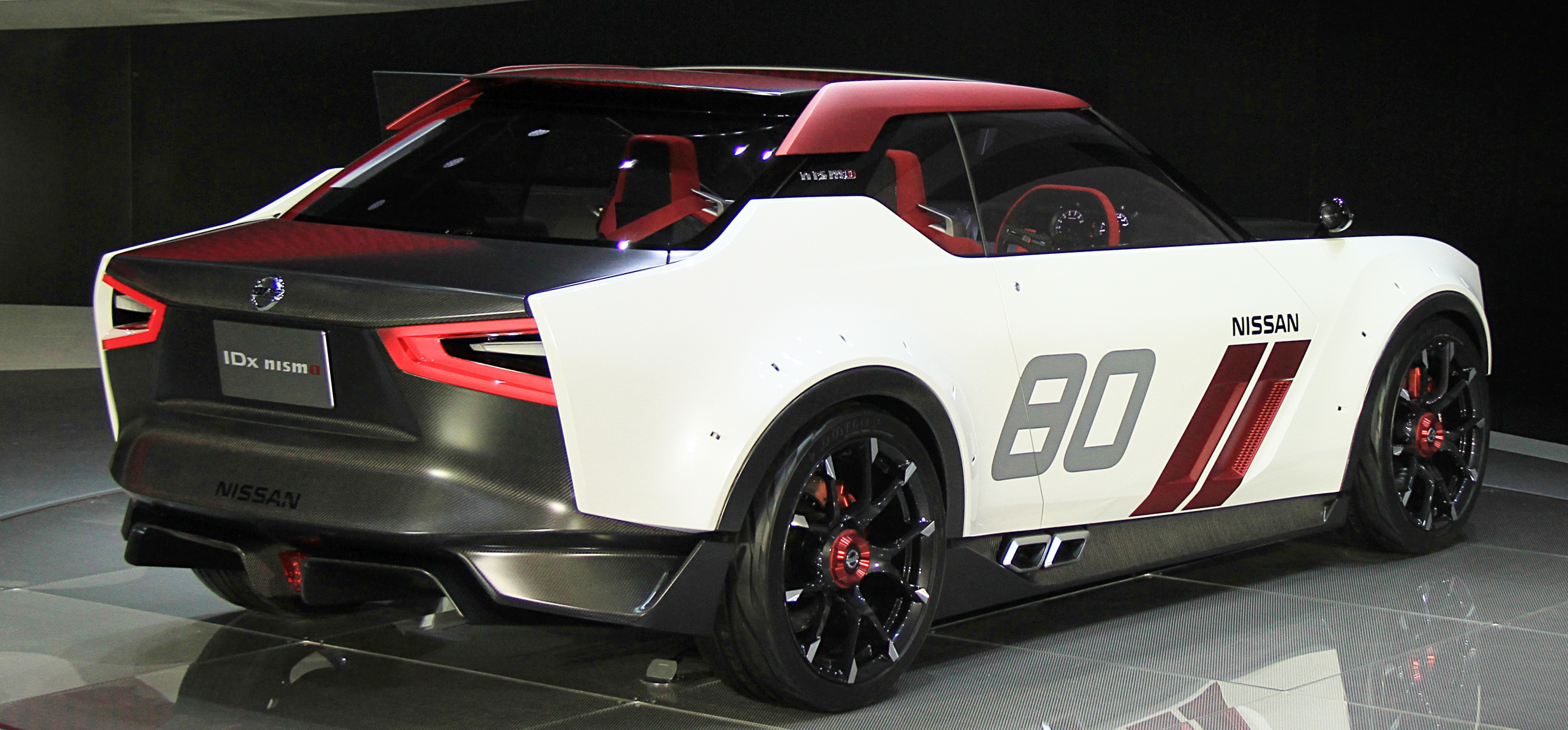
IDx NISMO rear

The NISMO version is expected to produce 200–230 hp (149–172 kW) with its 1.6L I4 shared with the Juke NISMO. This engine should be able to give the vehicle a top speed of 130 mph (209 km/h) and a 0–60 mph time of 7 seconds. It is inspired not only by driving simulators but also by racing.

== Reception ==
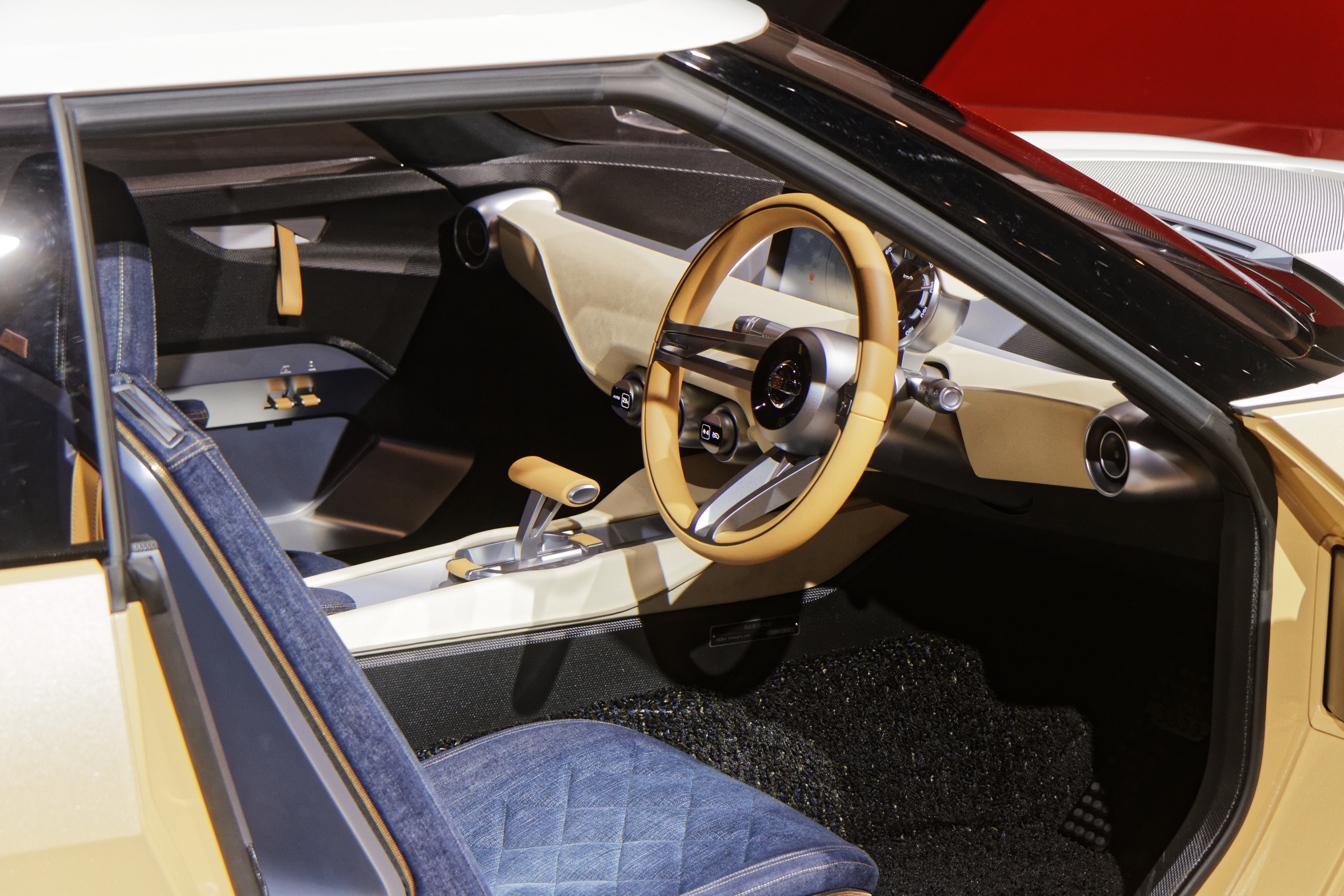
IDx Freeflow interior

The car was well received by the general public at the few events it has been shown at. Jay Leno drove the Nissan IDx NISMO and urged Nissan to turn the IDx into a production car. He said Nissan has created something simple and easy to drive, like the "good old days". Motor Trend complimented the IDx for its compact size and also saying it defines what a sports car should be. Road & Track liked the IDx because it is affordable, can seat a decent number of people and for the cameras in the "side view mirrors". Car and Driver also wants the car to be built adding they also think a sedan and wagon version will make the IDx perfect.

== See also ==
- Nissan Silvia (CSP311)
- Nissan Skyline (C10)
