= Ford Equator Concept =

The Ford Equator Concept could refer to several different concept cars by the American automotive company Ford Motor Company:

- Ford Equator Concept (2000), the 2000 concept car designed by J Mays.
- Ford Equator Concept (2005), the 2005 concept car designed by Ford Lio-Ho that previews the first generation Ford Escape (ZC) sold in the Asia-Pacific region.
