= Hyundai Blue-Will =

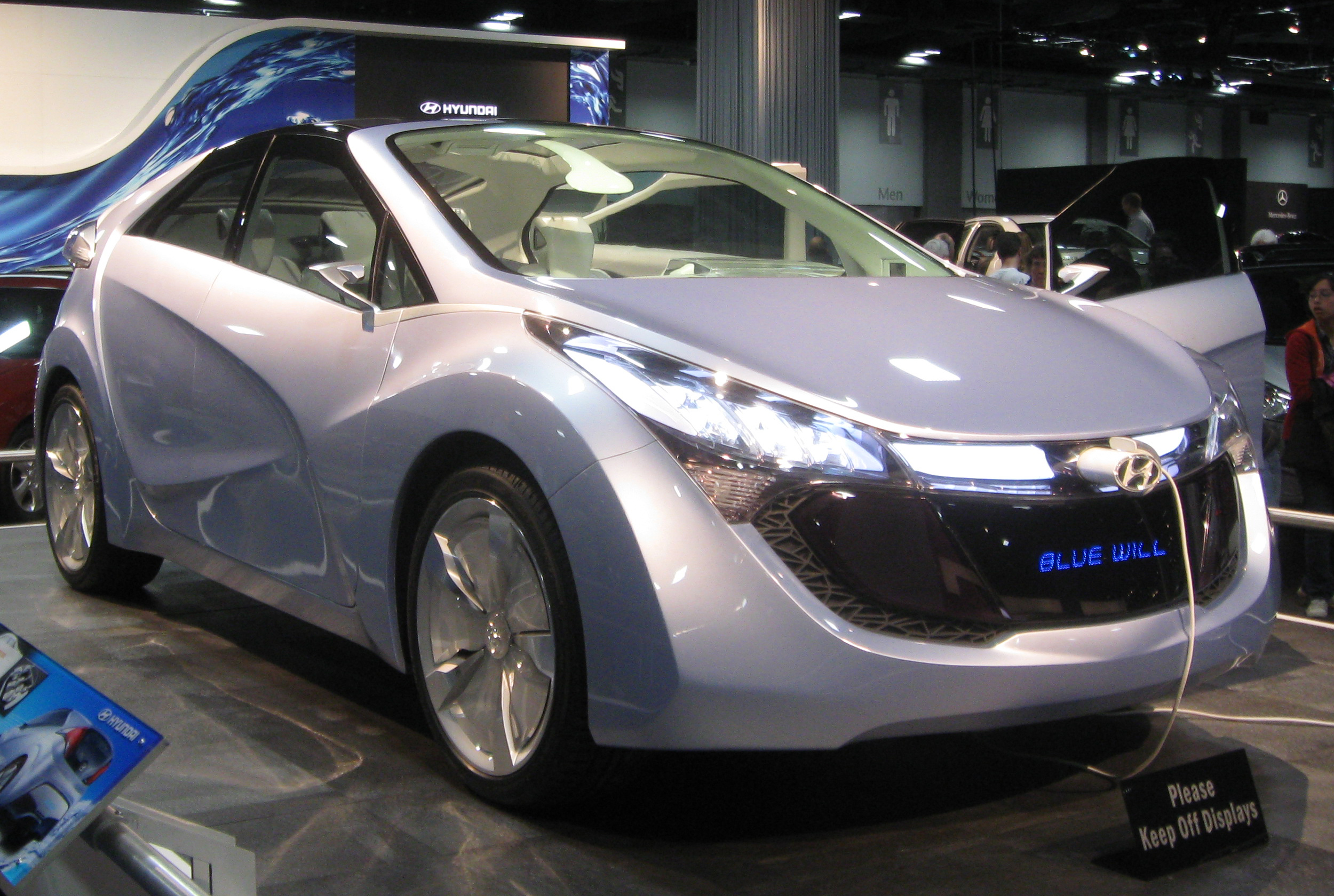

Overview
- Manufacturer: Hyundai
- Production: 2009 (Concept car)

Body and chassis
- Class: Compact car
- Body style: 5-door hatchback
- Layout: Front-engine, front-wheel-drive

Powertrain
- Engine: 1.6-liter Gamma 152-hp GDI engine and 100 kW (134 hp) electric motor
- Transmission: Continuously variable transmission

Dimensions
- Wheelbase: 2,700 mm (106.3 in)
- Length: 4,300 mm (169.3 in)
- Width: 1,801 mm (70.9 in)
- Height: 1,460 mm (57.5 in)

The Hyundai Blue-Will is a plug-in petrol-electric hybrid concept compact car designed by the South Korean car manufacturer Hyundai Motor Company. The vehicle was debuted at the 2009 Seoul Motor Show in South Korea.

The hybrid powertrain is based on the same Blue Drive architecture that Hyundai unveiled at the 2008 Los Angeles Auto Show. The Blue-Will uses a strong parallel hybrid system, meaning it's capable of driving the vehicle under electric power alone, using the internal combustion, or a combination of both. The first production applications from this vehicle will find their way into the Korean market's Hyundai Elantra LPI Hybrid and the Hyundai Sonata Hybrid that debut late in 2010.

== Design ==
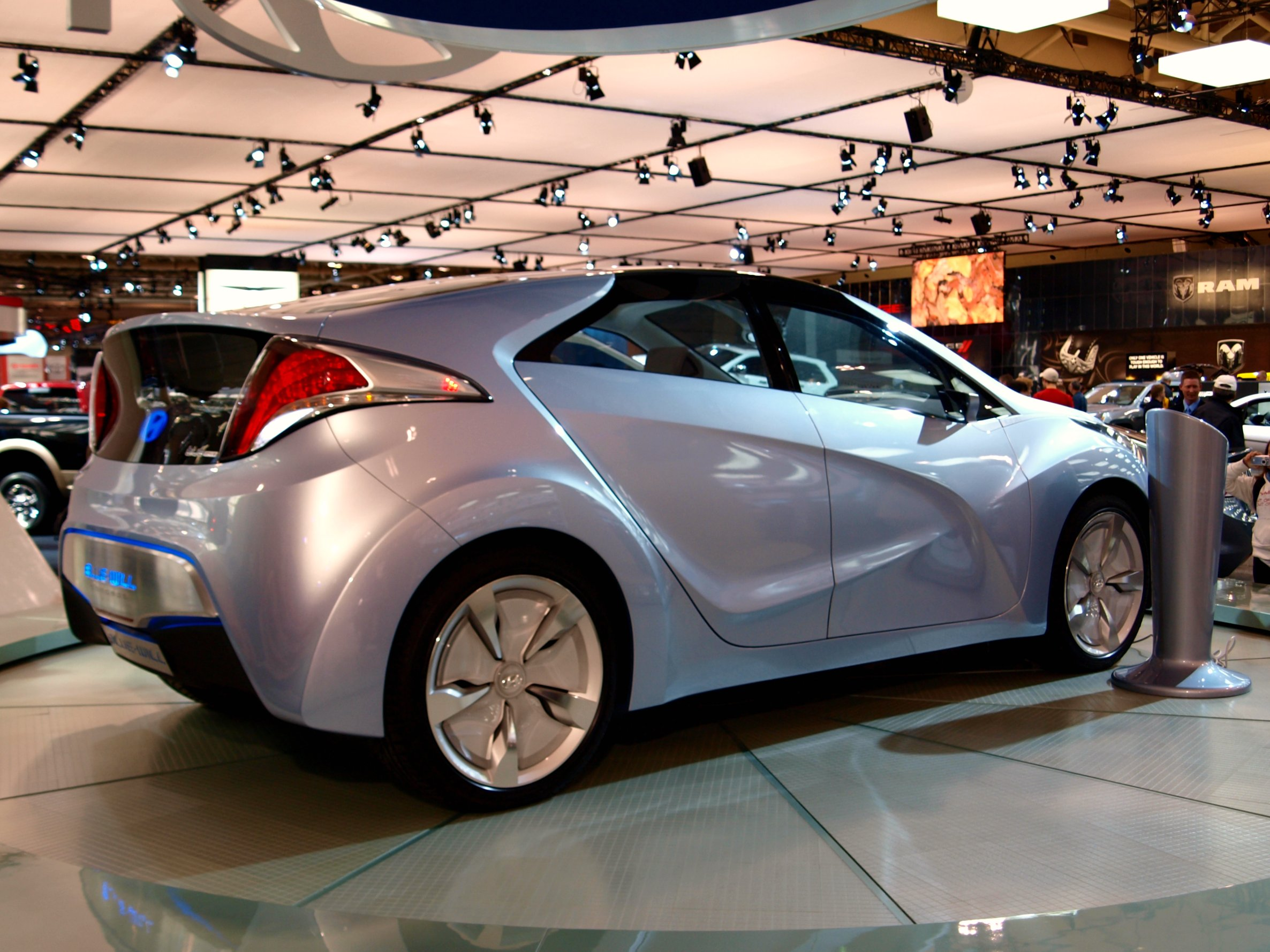
Rear of the Blue-Will.

The Blue-Will is code-named HND-4 and is the fourth concept vehicle from Hyundai's Namyang Design Center. Hyundai has not specifically announced plans to make the concept into a production model, but they did say the company's concepts are directly linked to real-world plans. Hyundai calls the Blue-Will concept "a test-bed of new ideas" that "foreshadows future focused hybrid production vehicles."

The Blue-Will has a wedge-shaped four-door hatchback body (with rear suicide doors) featuring a bold intersecting bodyside feature line which is defined as "Eco-sleek." Its smooth surface treatment extends to the undercarriage, where a full-length cover has been fitted to minimize aerodynamic drag helping maximize fuel economy. Also helping to maximize fuel economy, carbon-fiber reinforced plastics and nanocomposites were applied to the side sills, moldings, and fenders to reduce weight. Blue-Will uses a number of other environmentally friendly elements including headlight bezels made from recycled PET soft-drink bottles, an engine cover formed using bioplastics, and other various PLA and PA11 bioplastics. The exterior design also features a rear bike rack integrated onto the trunk adding extra convenience. Not all of the exterior pieces serve a definitive purpose though. The Blue-Will comes equipped with an LED panel where the grille should be. The car is fitted with 245/40 R20 low-rolling resistance tires. "Hyundai pledges to reduce the average weight of its fleet by 10 percent by 2015," said Dave Zuchowski, vice president of national sales at Hyundai Motor America.

=== Interior ===
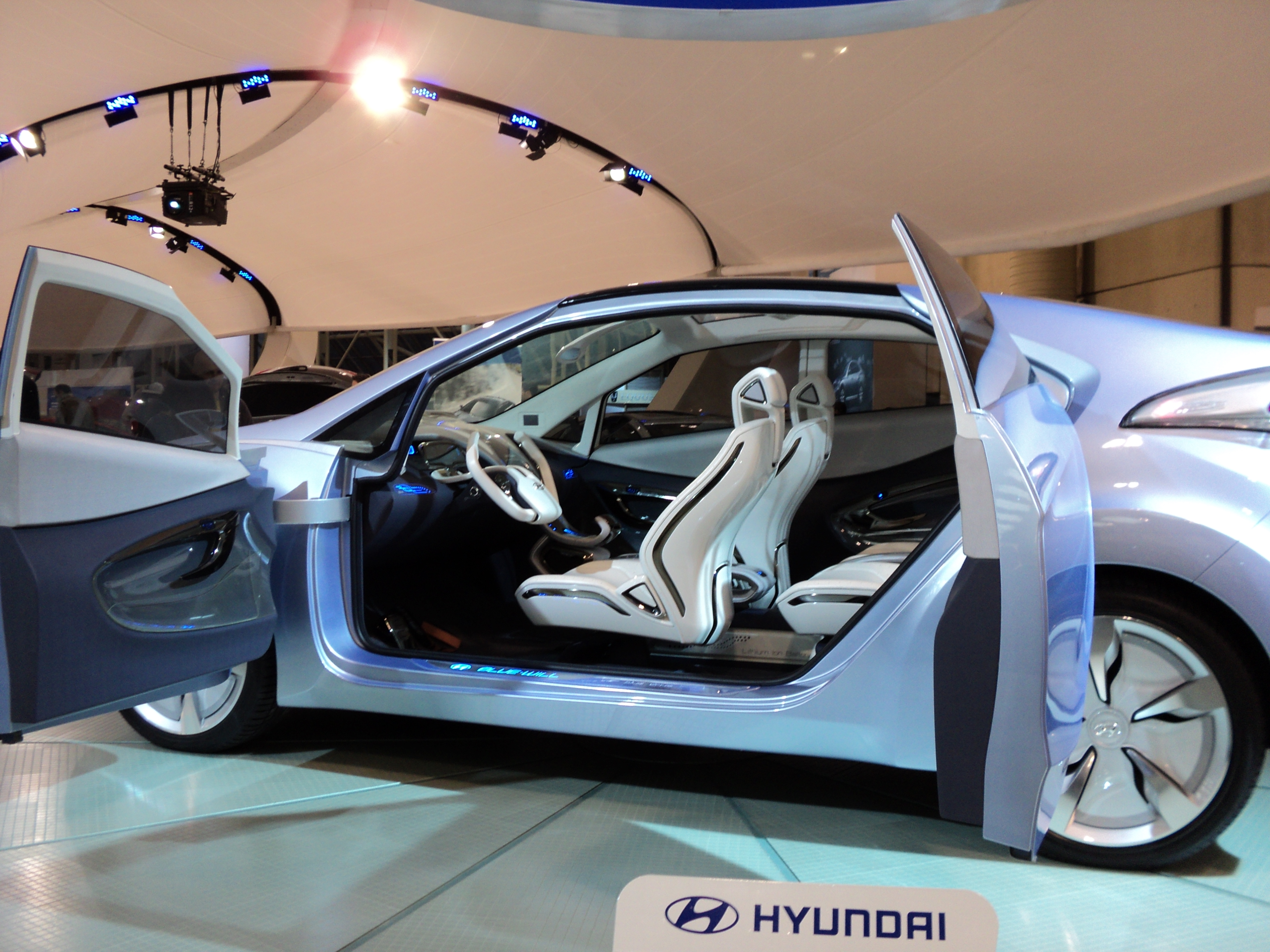
Interior of the Blue-Will concept.

The Blue-Will's interior features a number of high-tech extras as well as environmentally friendly elements. The interior components are produced from bio-degradable plant extracts and other PLA and PA11 bioplastics. Solar panels mounted in its panoramic roof are designed to "trickle-charge" a cabin cooling fan that will cool the inside of the Blue-Will while it is parked. Designers were able to redefine the interior of the compact car achieving a "digital flow" throughout the inside due to rapid advances in information technologies. The conventional gauge cluster was replaced with an extremely thin Transparent Organic Light Emitting Diode (LED) display mounted on the steering column which can be adjusted for distance and angle. The display can be shown in high resolution color thanks to Thin-film TOLED technology. The center stack was designed with a clean and simple look with a color touchscreen. The screen operates climate controls, infotainment and drive mode systems, Bluetooth speakers, and the Eco-Coach which is the focal point of the display. Eco-Coach graphically promotes fuel-saving habits by providing continuous feedback on fuel consumption and driving efficiency.

== Specifications ==
The Blue-Will's Gasoline Direct Injected engine is mated to a Continuously Variable Transmission (CVT), which provides better fuel economy than other transmissions by allowing the engine to run at its most efficient revolutions per minute (RPM) for a range of vehicle speeds. The wheels are turned by power coming directly from the gasoline engine, the electric motor, or both together depending on conditions and demand. This type of hybrid technology allows the internal combustion engine, the electric motor, and gear box to be coupled by automatically controlled clutches. The fuel tank for the internal combustion engine is located under the rear seat where it is bundled alongside the lithium-ion polymer battery to provide maximum luggage space in the rear.

=== Engine ===
The Blue-Will is powered by an all-aluminum 4-cylinder 1.6-liter gasoline direct injection (GDI) engine developing 152-horsepower along with a 100 kilowatt (134 hp) electric motor, result in gin a combined 286 hp. This electric motor is powered by a lithium-ion polymer battery that can be recharged using household current. Its lithium polymer cell technology is lighter than other lithium-ion chemistries, because it uses electrolyte in the form of a solid polymer, rather than a liquid. The 100 kilowatt electric motor should allow the Blue-Will to operate under electric power pretty much throughout its operating range. Hyundai doesn't say how big the lithium polymer battery pack is, but the automaker says the Blue-Will will be able to run up to 40 miles on a single electric charge. Like the Toyota Prius, the Blue-Will has an engine that is directly connected to the drive wheels and runs in parallel with the electric motor. The Blue-Will's engine efficiency is further improved by a thermal generator, fitted into the exhaust manifold, that recaptures energy from hot exhaust gases and converts it into electrical energy to contribute power to auxiliary systems.

Engine	1.6 Liter Gamma 152-HP GDI engine 100 kW Electric Motor
Transmission	CVT / Fixed Gear
Batteries	Lithium Polymer
Fuel Economy (Pure HEV Mode)	50–55 MPG
Fuel Economy (Plug-in HEV Mode)	106 MPG
Vehicle Range	652 Miles
Streering	Drive-by-wire
Gauge Cluster	Ultra-thin transparent organic LED
Drive Selector & HVAC	Touch-screen control
Auxiliary; Power; Generation	1. Exhaust manifold-mounted thermoelectric generator 2. Roof-mounted dye-sensitized solar cells 3. Regenerative braking

=== Environmental impact ===
The Blue-Will is designed to achieve greater fuel economy and lower vehicle emissions than convention combustion engines. Through the use of auxiliary power generation features, the Blue-Will provides more self sustainable operation. Also, the lithium battery produces a higher output (increasing vehicle power), more efficient use of electricity, and provides excellent durability (the life of the battery is roughly equivalent to the life of the vehicle).

== See also ==
- List of hybrid vehicles
- Hybrid vehicle drivetrain
- Hybrid electric vehicle
- Plug-in hybrid
- Efficient energy use
- Electric vehicle
- Lithium-ion polymer battery
