= Maserati Kubang =

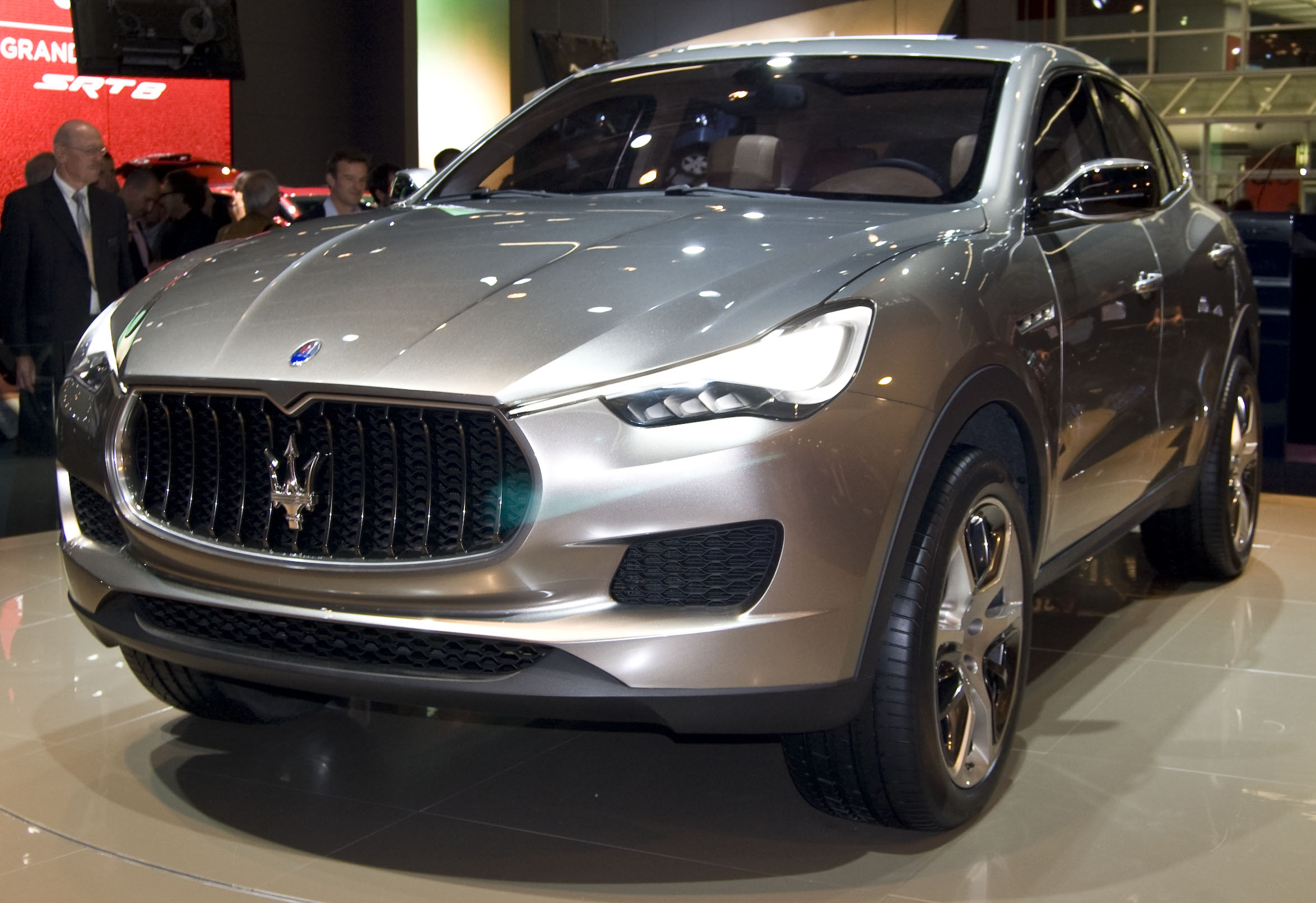

Overview
- Manufacturer: Maserati
- Production: 2011 (Concept car)
- Assembly: Italy

Body and chassis
- Class: Mid-size luxury crossover SUV
- Body style: 5-door SUV
- Layout: F4 layout
- Platform: Jeep Grand Cherokee
- Related: Maserati Levante

Powertrain
- Engine: 4.2 L F136 V8
- Transmission: 8-speed ZF 8HP automatic

Dimensions
- Length: 4,984 mm (196.2 in)
- Width: 1,942 mm (76.5 in)
- Height: 1,650 mm (65.0 in)

Chronology
- Predecessor: Maserati Kubang GT Wagon
- Successor: Maserati Levante

The Maserati Kubang is a 2011 concept car unveiled at the Frankfurt Auto Show. Created under the Maserati subsidiary of Fiat, it has not been introduced for production. The Levante SUV, which is based on the Kubang, was introduced for production in 2016.

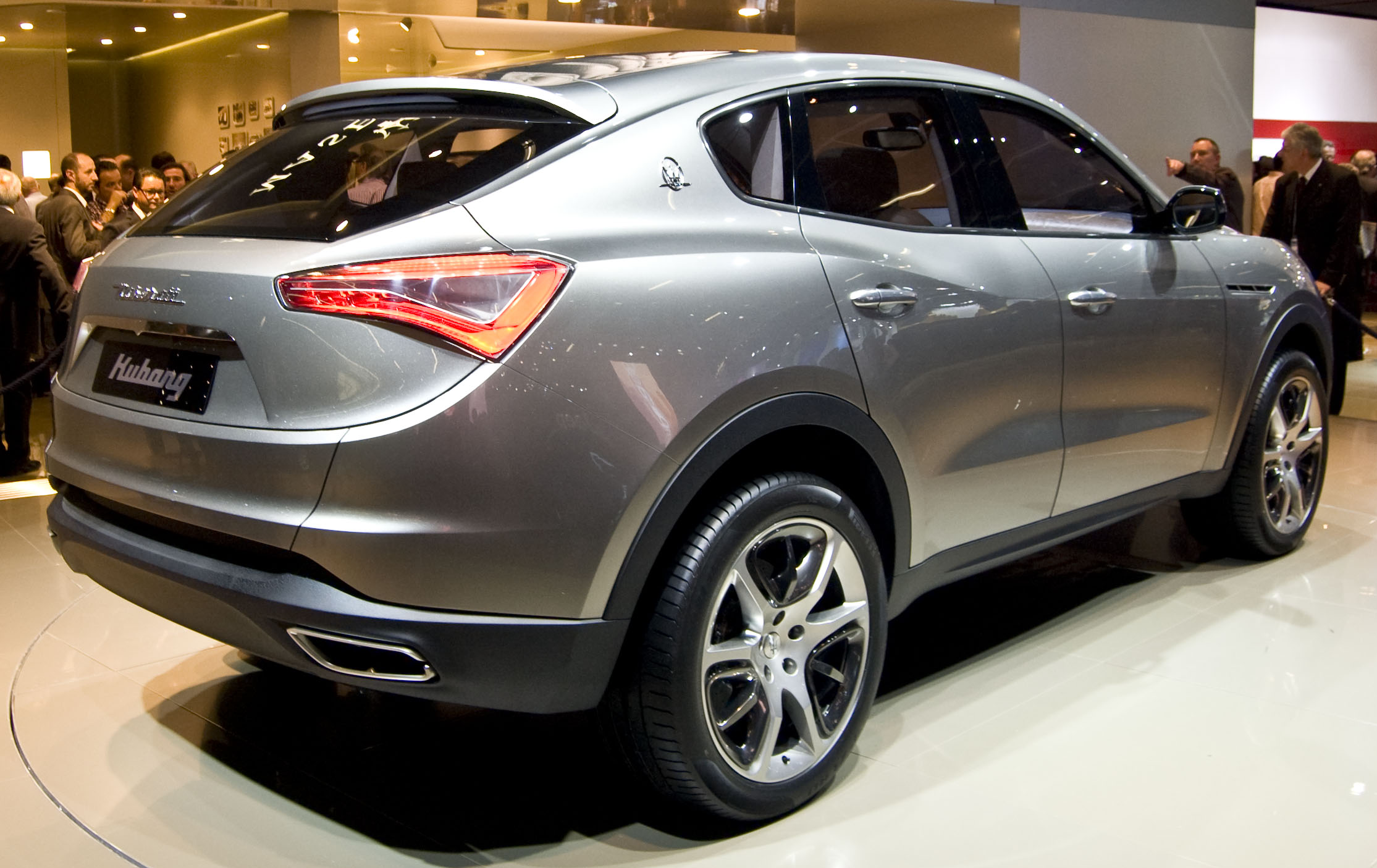
Kubang rear
