= Volkswagen Atlas =

Mid-size crossover SUV

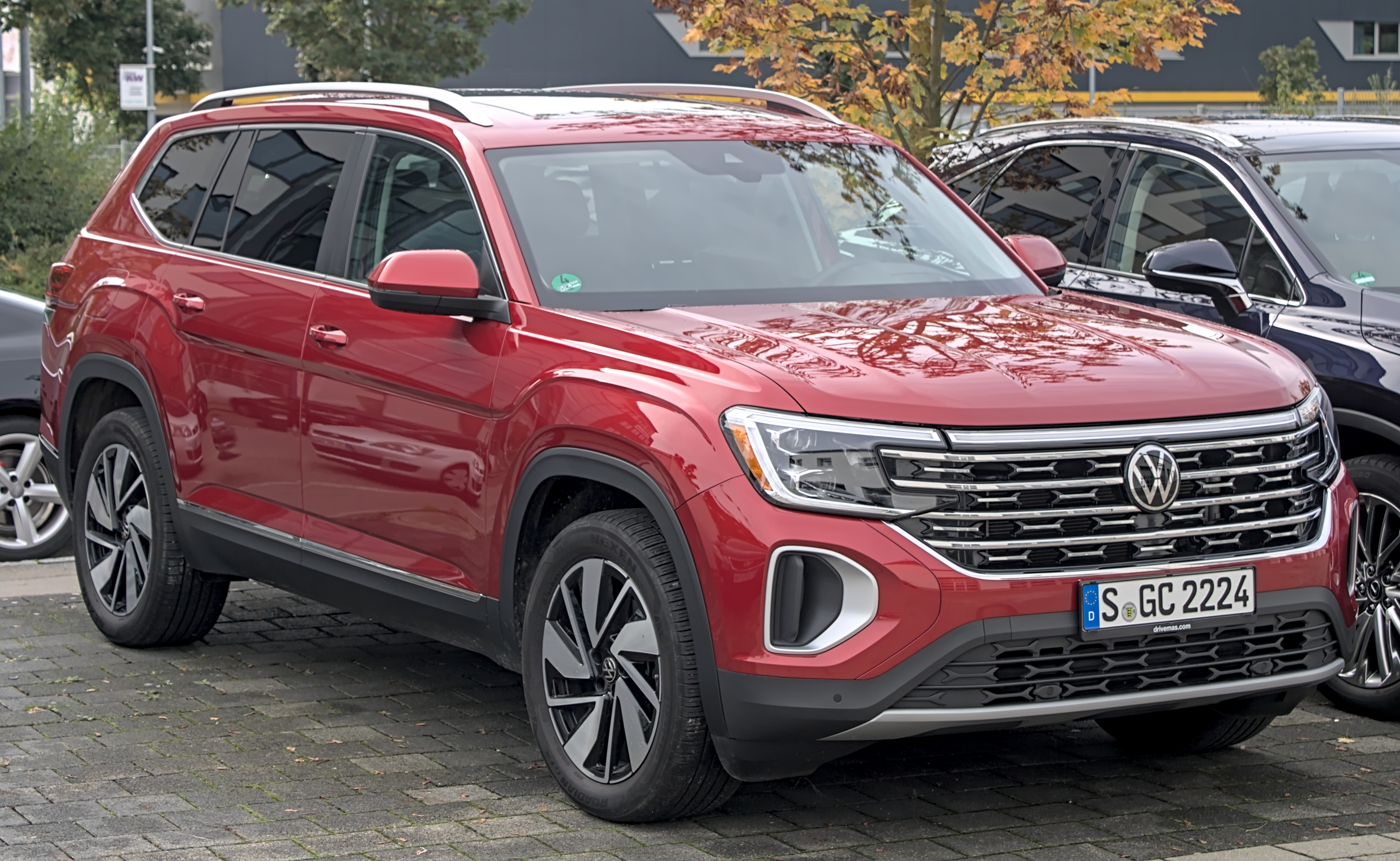

Overview
- Manufacturer: Volkswagen
- Also called: Volkswagen Teramont (China and Middle East)
- Production: 2017–present
- Model years: 2018–present

Body and chassis
- Class: Mid-size crossover SUV
- Body style: 5-door SUV
- Layout: Front-engine, front-wheel-drive; Front-engine, all-wheel-drive

Chronology
- Predecessor: Volkswagen Touareg (US and Canada)

The Volkswagen Atlas is a mid-size crossover SUV manufactured by the German automaker Volkswagen since 2017. Developed mainly for the American, Chinese, and Middle Eastern markets, the vehicle is based on the MQB platform. In China, Mexico, the Middle East, and Vietnam, the vehicle is marketed as the Volkswagen Teramont (Chinese: 大众途昂, pinyin: Dàzhòng túáng). It is positioned above the Tayron (sold in North America as the Tiguan) and in China, below the Tavendor and Talagon.

== First generation (2017) ==
First generation
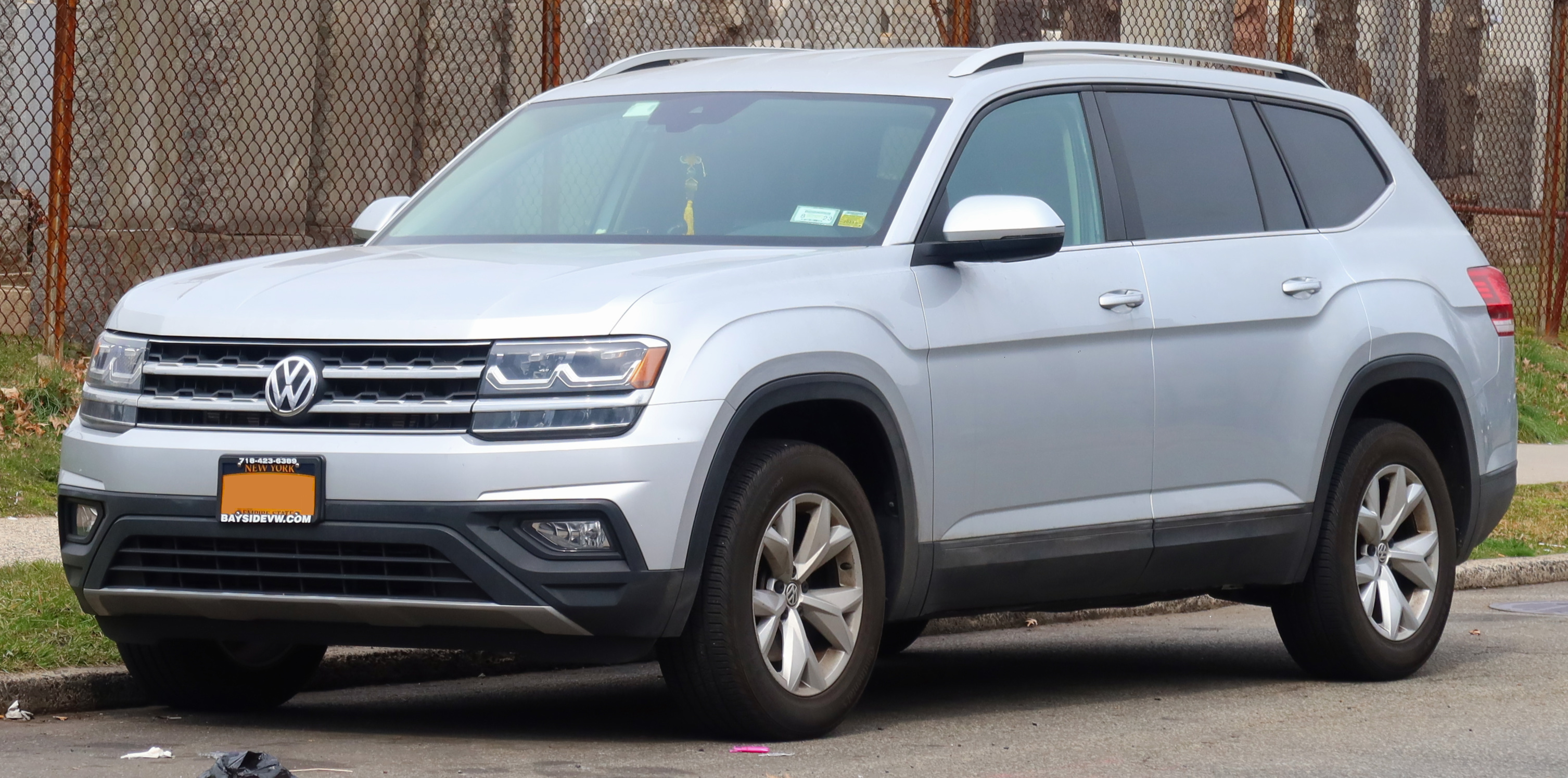

Overview
- Model code: CA1
- Also called: Volkswagen Teramont
- Production: 2017–present
- Model years: 2018–2026
- Assembly: United States: Chattanooga, Tennessee (Chattanooga Assembly Plant); China: Ningbo, Zhejiang (SAIC-VW)
- Designer: Oliver Stefani

Body and chassis
- Platform: Volkswagen Group MQB
- Related: Volkswagen Talagon; Volkswagen Viloran; Volkswagen Tavendor; Audi Q6

Powertrain
- Engine: Gasoline: 2.0 L EA888 DCGA/DPL/DKX TSI I4; 2.5 L EA390 DPK/DDK VR6 (China); 3.6 L EA390 CDVC VR6
- Transmission: 8-speed automatic; 7-speed DSG

Dimensions
- Wheelbase: 2,980 mm (117.3 in)
- Length: 5,040 mm (198.3 in); 4,970 mm (195.5 in) (two-row versions)
- Width: 1,990 mm (78.3 in)
- Height: 1,780 mm (70.0 in); 1,720 mm (67.7 in) (two-row versions)
- Curb weight: 1,864–2,046 kg (4,109–4,511 lb)

The first generation is marketed as the Atlas in the United States, Canada, Chile, and Israel, the vehicle is known as the Teramont elsewhere, including the rest of the Middle East, Africa, as well as in Mexico, Russia, Colombia and China, where production in Ningbo began in 2017. For markets outside China, the Atlas/Teramont is produced in the Chattanooga plant in Chattanooga, Tennessee, United States.

The vehicle features a transverse mounted four-cylinder or Volkswagen's VR6 engine. Up to the introduction of the China-only Viloran, the Atlas was the largest vehicle produced on the Volkswagen Group MQB platform.

=== Markets ===
==== North America (Atlas) ====
The CrossBlue previewed the Atlas/Teramont as a concept diesel plug-in-hybrid mid-size crossover SUV in September 2013. The Atlas was introduced at the LA Auto Show in Los Angeles on November 17, 2016. The name Atlas was picked for the region after the proposed Teramont name was rejected by dealers. It went on sale in the United States and Canada in May 2017 as a 2018 model year.

Features included in the Atlas are the VW Digital Cockpit, up to 96.8 cubic feet (2.74 m^{3}) of rear cargo space, seventeen total cup holders, a second row bench seat with room for three child safety seats or optional second row captains chairs with room for two child safety seats, a third row seating area that can be accessed with child safety seats still in place, standard Android Auto and Apple CarPlay connectivity with Volkswagen CarNet and MirrorLink, seven total stability enhancing systems, and available Volkswagen 4Motion four wheel drive system on most models.

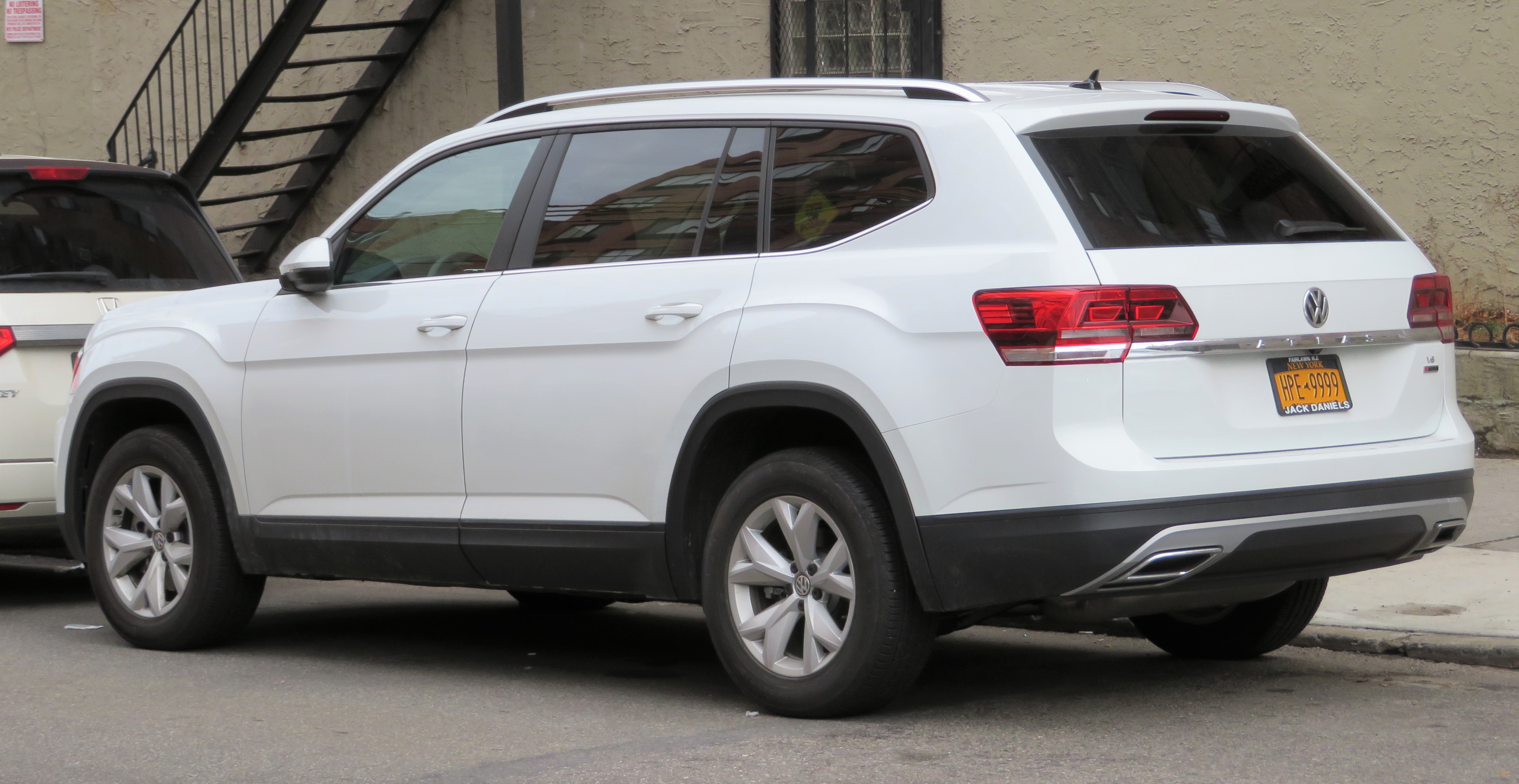
Rear view

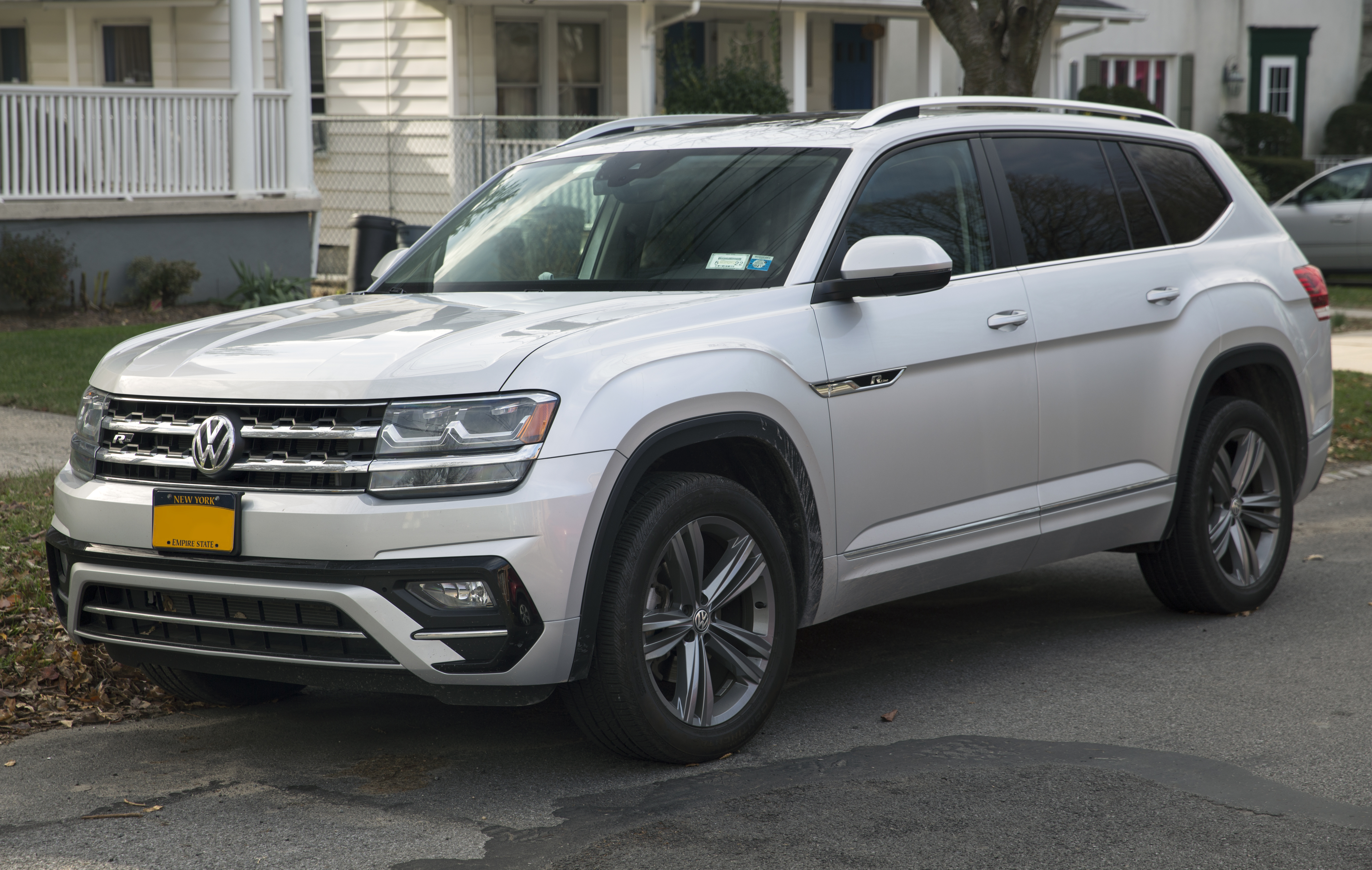
2019 Volkswagen Atlas SE R-Line (United States)

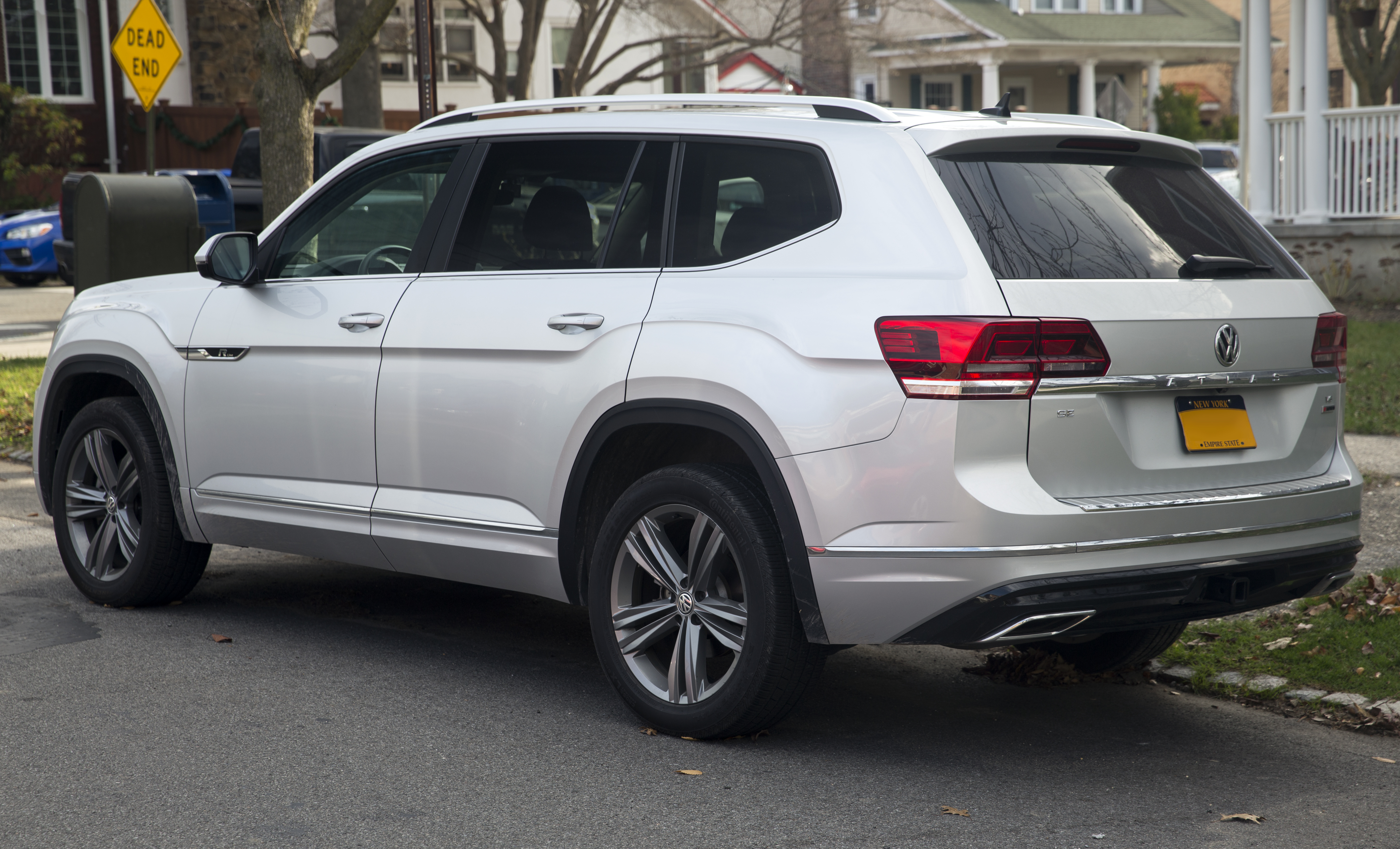
Rear view

===== Engines =====
The Atlas has two gasoline engine options in the United States.

Gasoline engines
Model	Displacement	Series	Power	Torque	Transmission	Model years
2.0 TSI	1,984 cc (121.1 cu in) I4	EA888 (DCGA)	235 hp (238 PS; 175 kW)	258 lb⋅ft (350 N⋅m)	8-speed automatic	2018–2023
2.0 TSI	1,984 cc (121.1 cu in) I4	EA888	269 hp (273 PS; 201 kW)	273 lb⋅ft (370 N⋅m)	8-speed automatic	2024–present
3.6 VR6 FSI	3,597 cc (219.5 cu in) VR6	EA390 (CDVC)	276 hp (280 PS; 206 kW)	266 lb⋅ft (361 N⋅m)	8-speed automatic	2018–2023

==== Safety ====
The 2018 Atlas received the IIHS "Top Safety Pick" rating after earning "Good" ratings in all five crashworthiness tests, and a "Superior" rating on the front crash prevention test. This was in January 2018.

==== 2021 refresh ====
At the 2020 Chicago Auto Show, Volkswagen unveiled the refreshed Atlas for the model year of 2021. Changes include a new front end, which is based on the Atlas Cross Sport, redesigned wheels, new rear lights, and a new steering wheel. It was facelifted for Mexico on December 1, 2020, alongside the introduction of the Teramont Cross Sport.

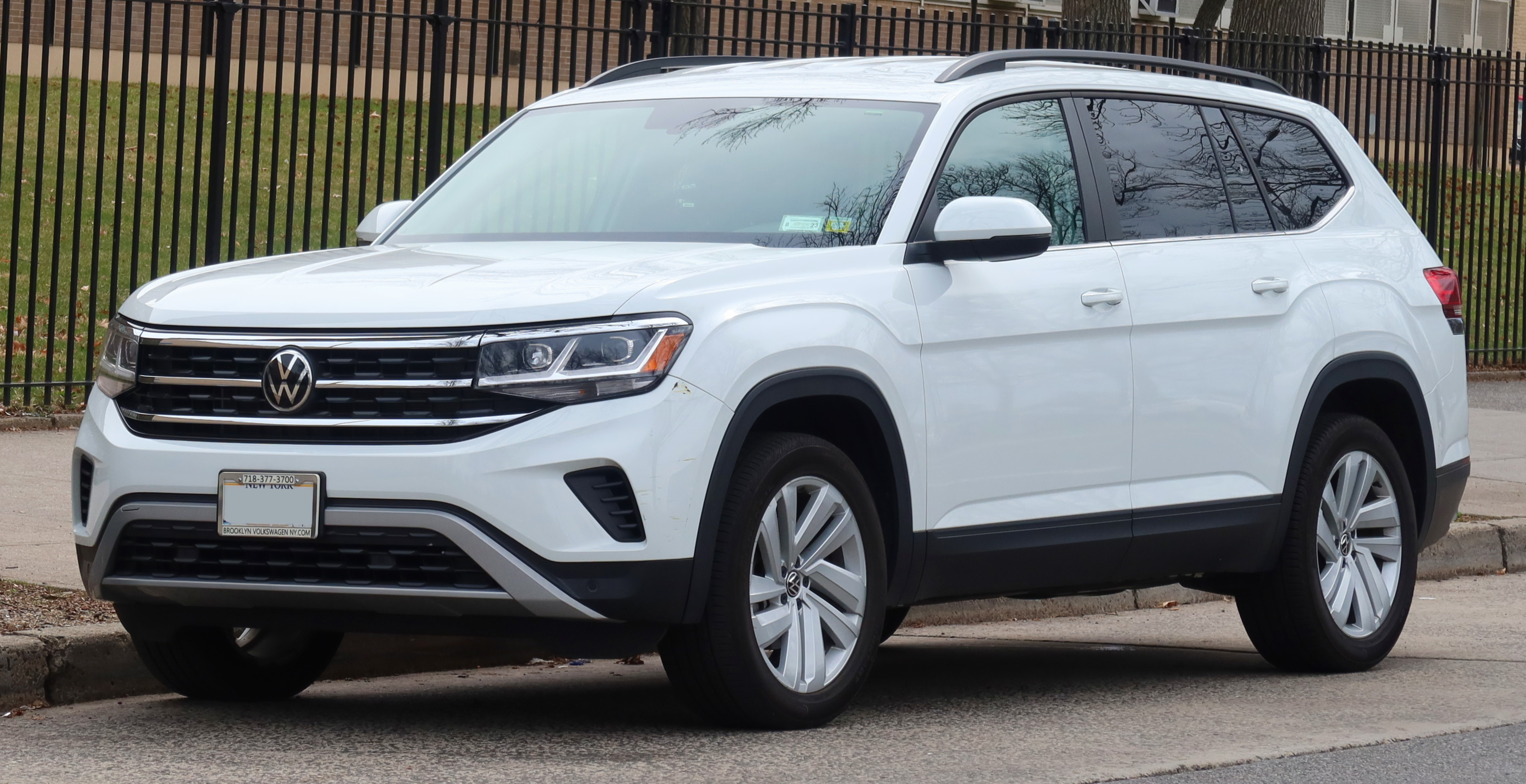
2021 Atlas

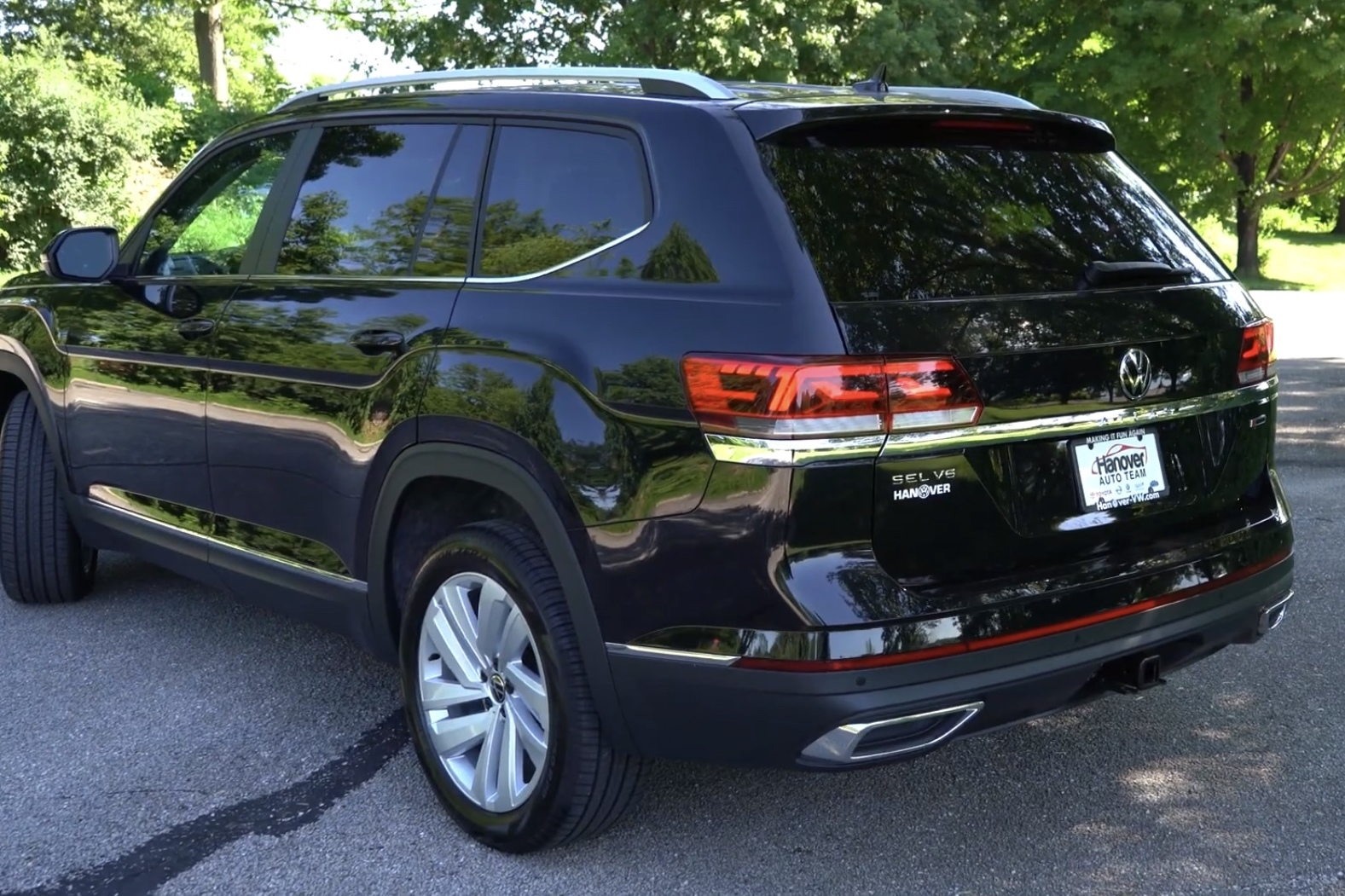
Rear view

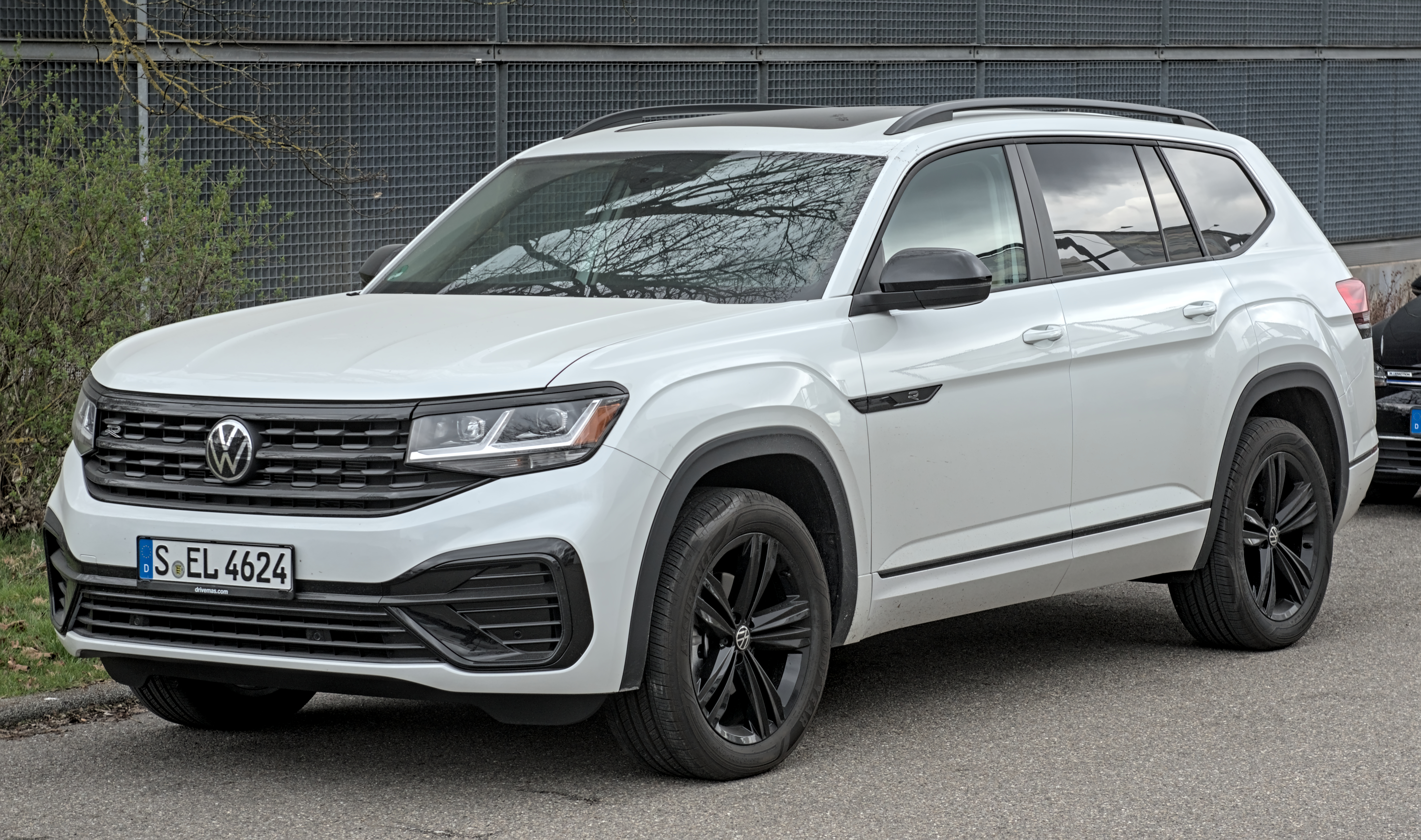
2021 Volkswagen Atlas SEL R-Line

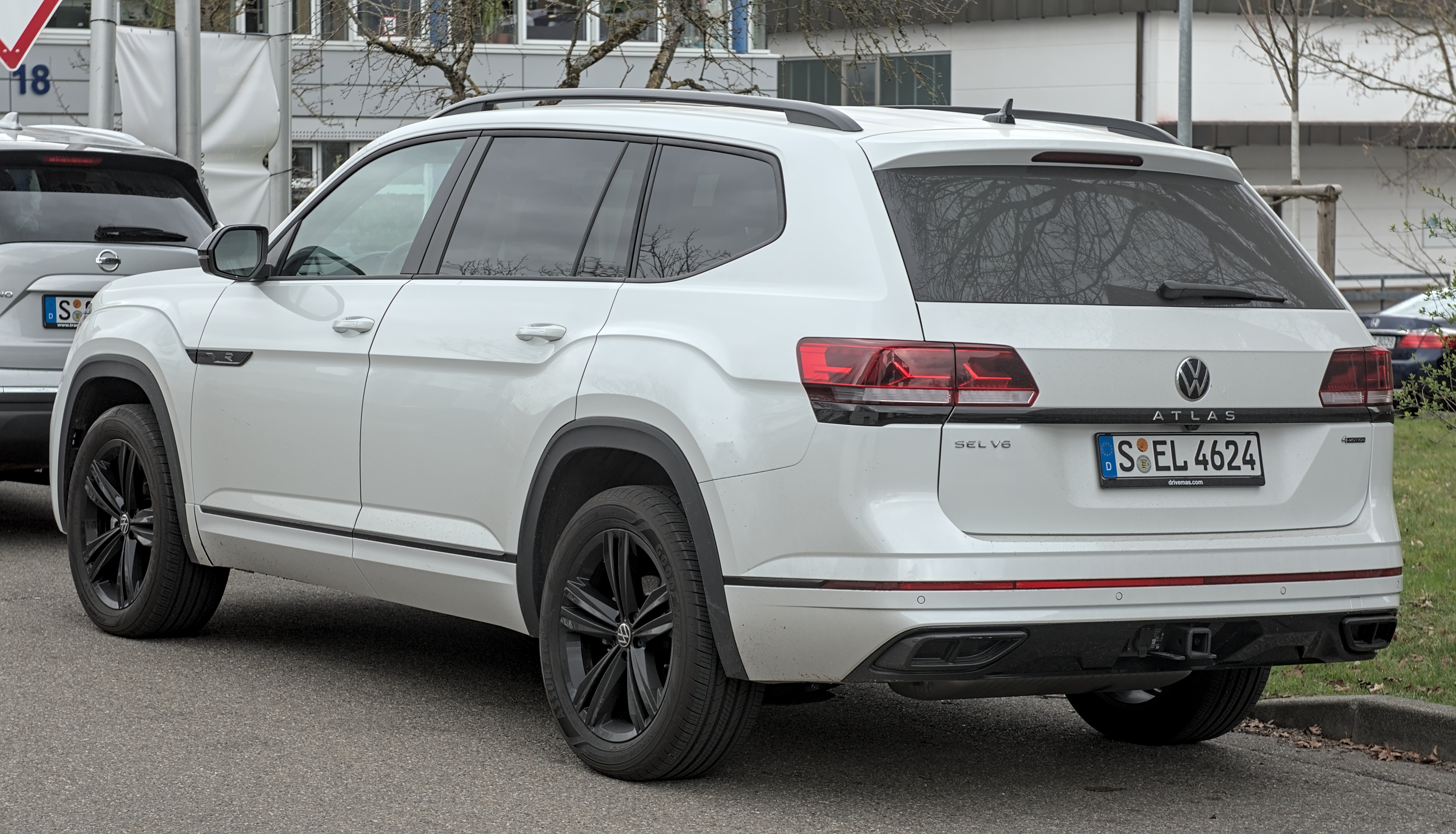
2021 Volkswagen Atlas SEL R-Line

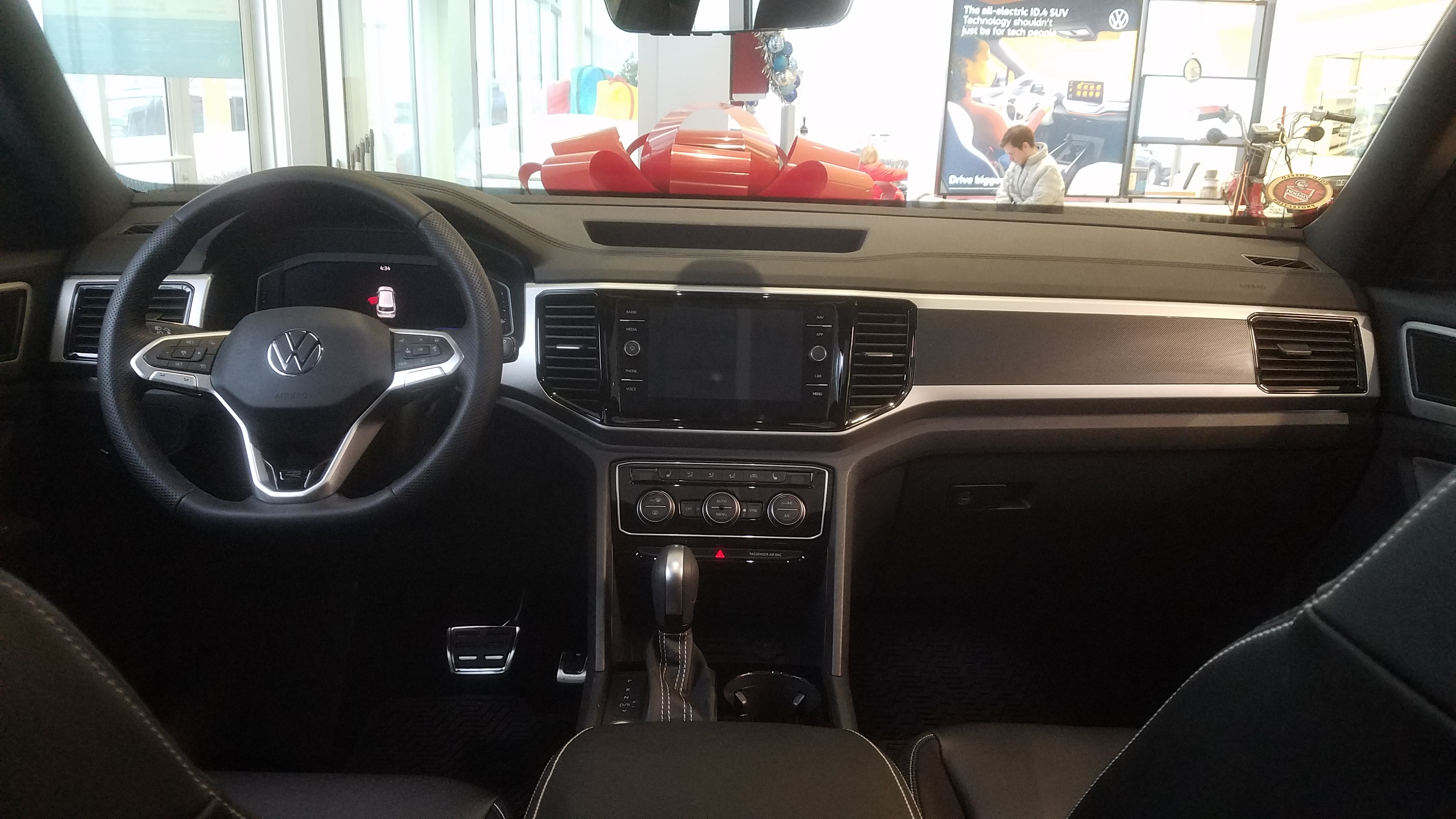
Interior

==== 2024 refresh ====
The 2024 model year Atlas and Atlas Cross Sport was revealed in February 2023. Changes include a redesigned front and rear clip, and a heavily revised interior design. The Atlas also gained an electronic shift-by-wire gear selector, 10.3-inch digital gauge cluster and a 12.0-inch touchscreen infotainment system. Since the 2024 refresh, the Atlas is no longer offered with a VR6 engine due to tougher EPA emissions standards required for future model years and a switch to a Hyundai sourced 8-speed transmission. A 269 hp (273 PS; 201 kW) turbocharged 2.0-liter four-cylinder gasoline engine became the only engine option, with towing capacity unchanged at 5,000 pounds (2,268 kg).

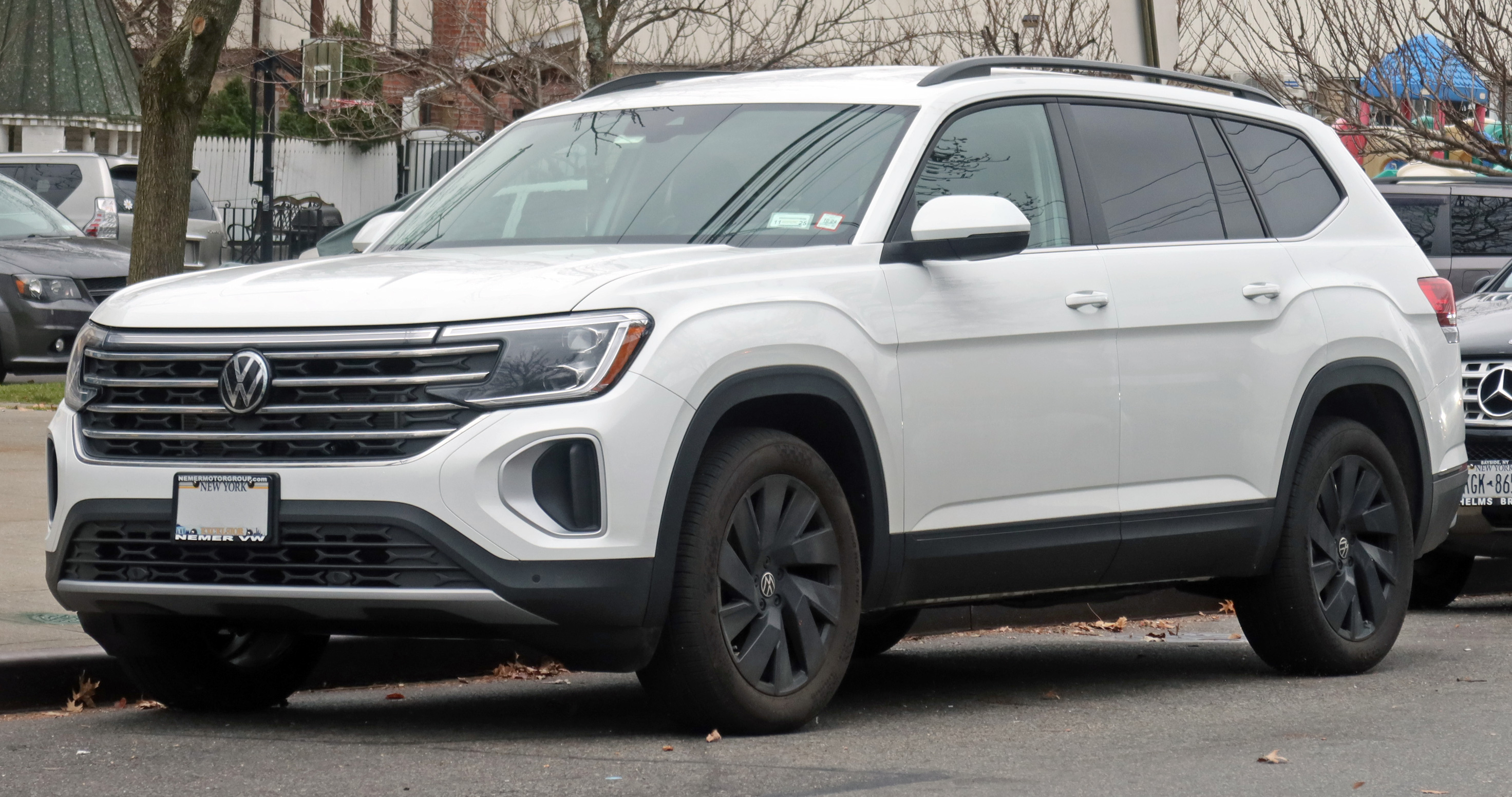
2024 Atlas Peak Edition

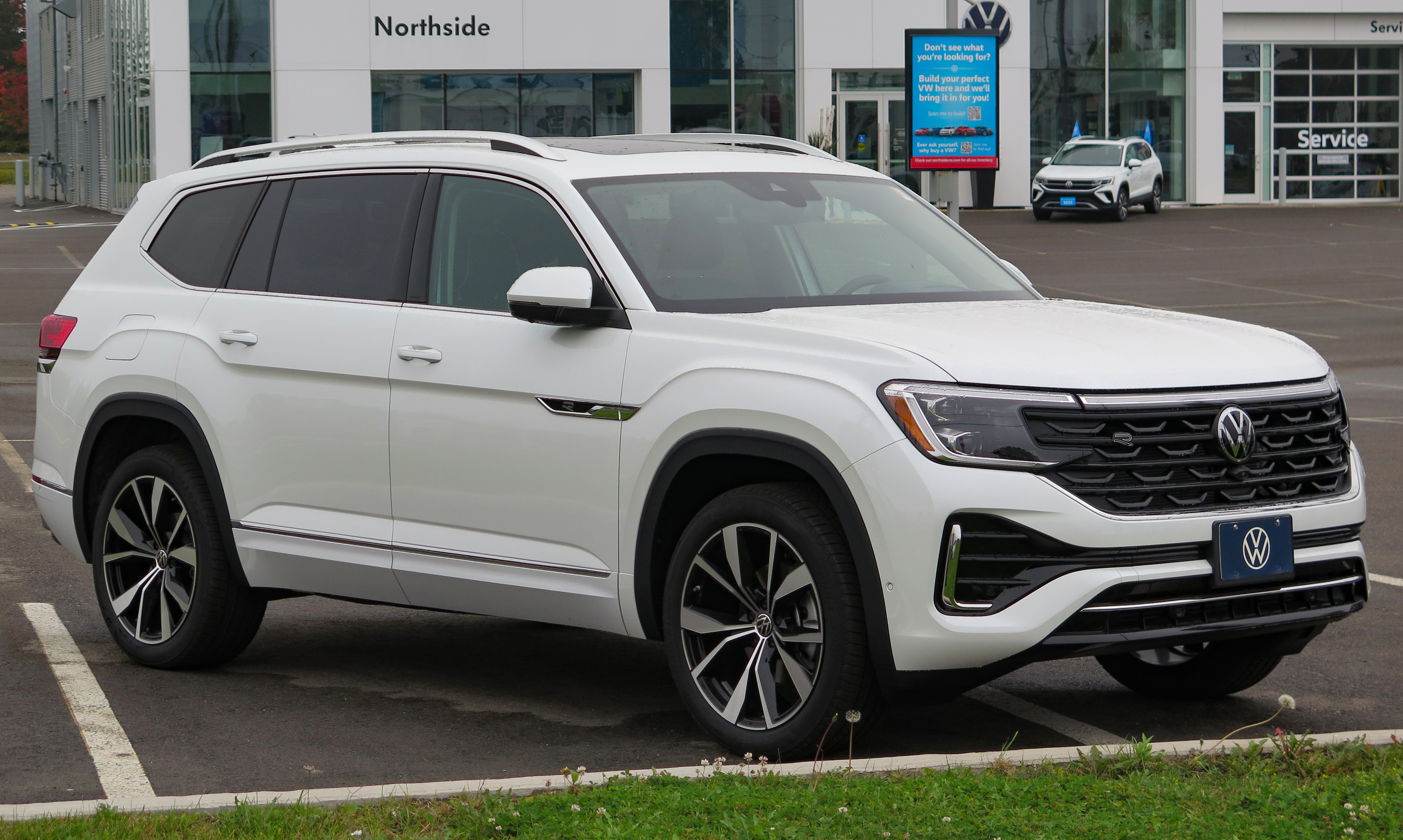
2024 Atlas Execline

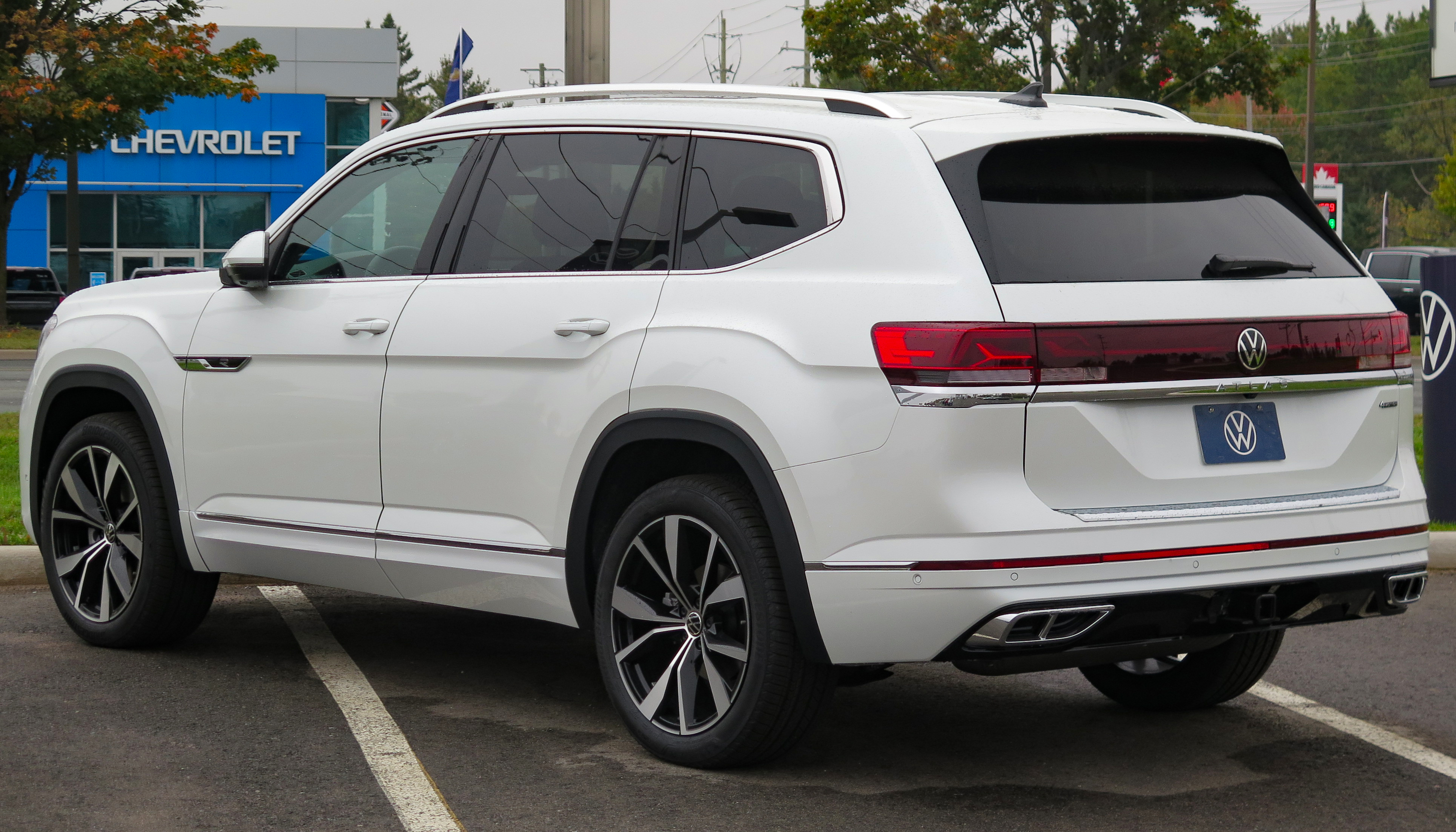
Rear view

=== China (Teramont) ===
In China, the Teramont was unveiled at the 2016 Guangzhou Auto Show. The Teramont is made in China by the SAIC-Volkswagen joint venture for the Chinese market. The Volkswagen Teramont is available with an 186 hp (189 PS; 139 kW) 2.0-liter TSI, a 220 hp (223 PS; 164 kW) 2.0-liter TSI, or with a 299 hp (303 PS; 223 kW) 2.5-liter VR6. All variants are paired to a 7-speed DSG with the 4MOTION all-wheel drive system. The 2.0-liter engines are locally manufactured in China, while the VR6 engine is manufactured in Germany and shipped over to the factory in Shanghai. It was developed specifically for the Chinese market where engines above 3.0 liters are subject to heavy excise tax.

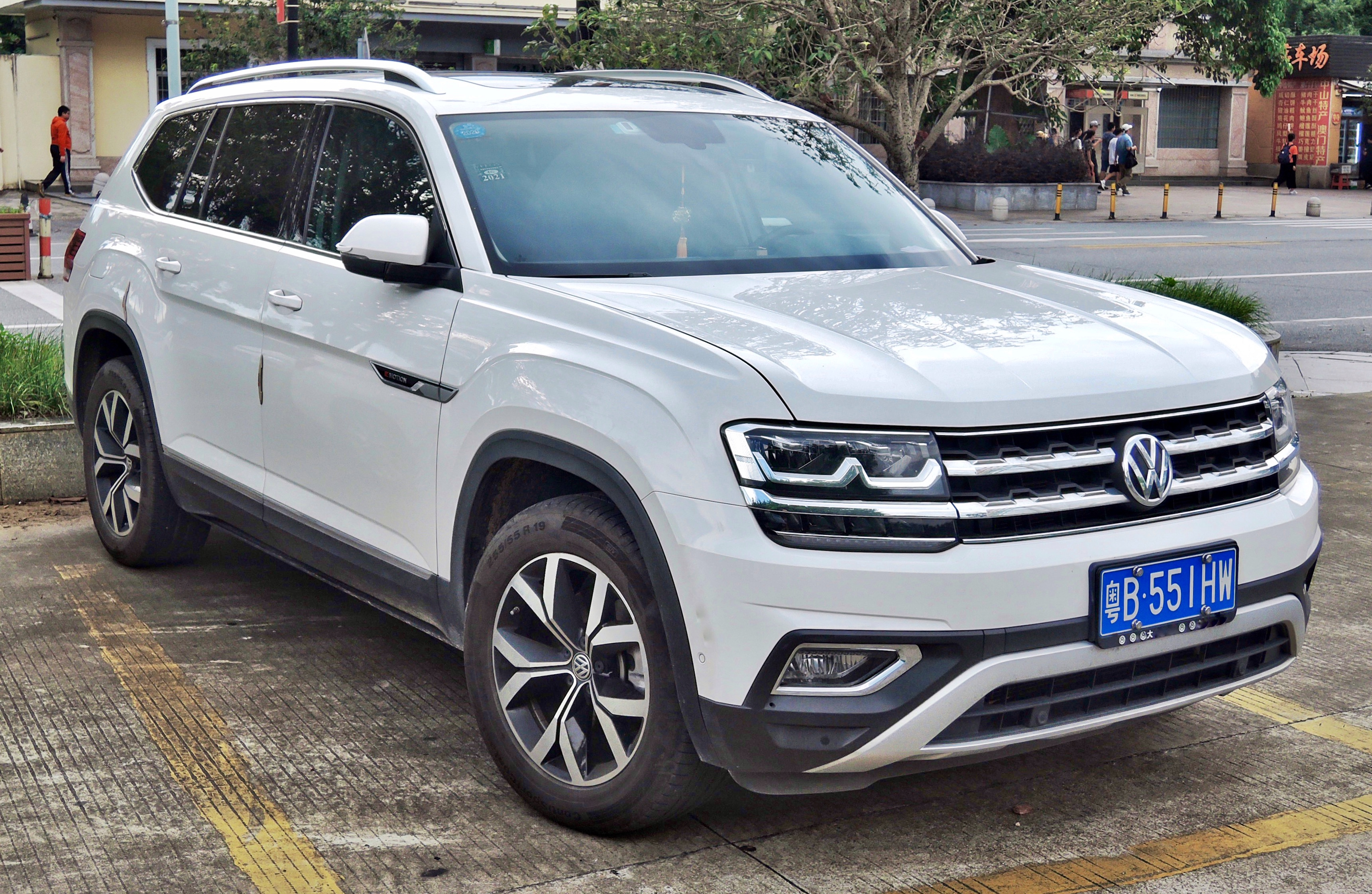
Volkswagen Teramont (China)

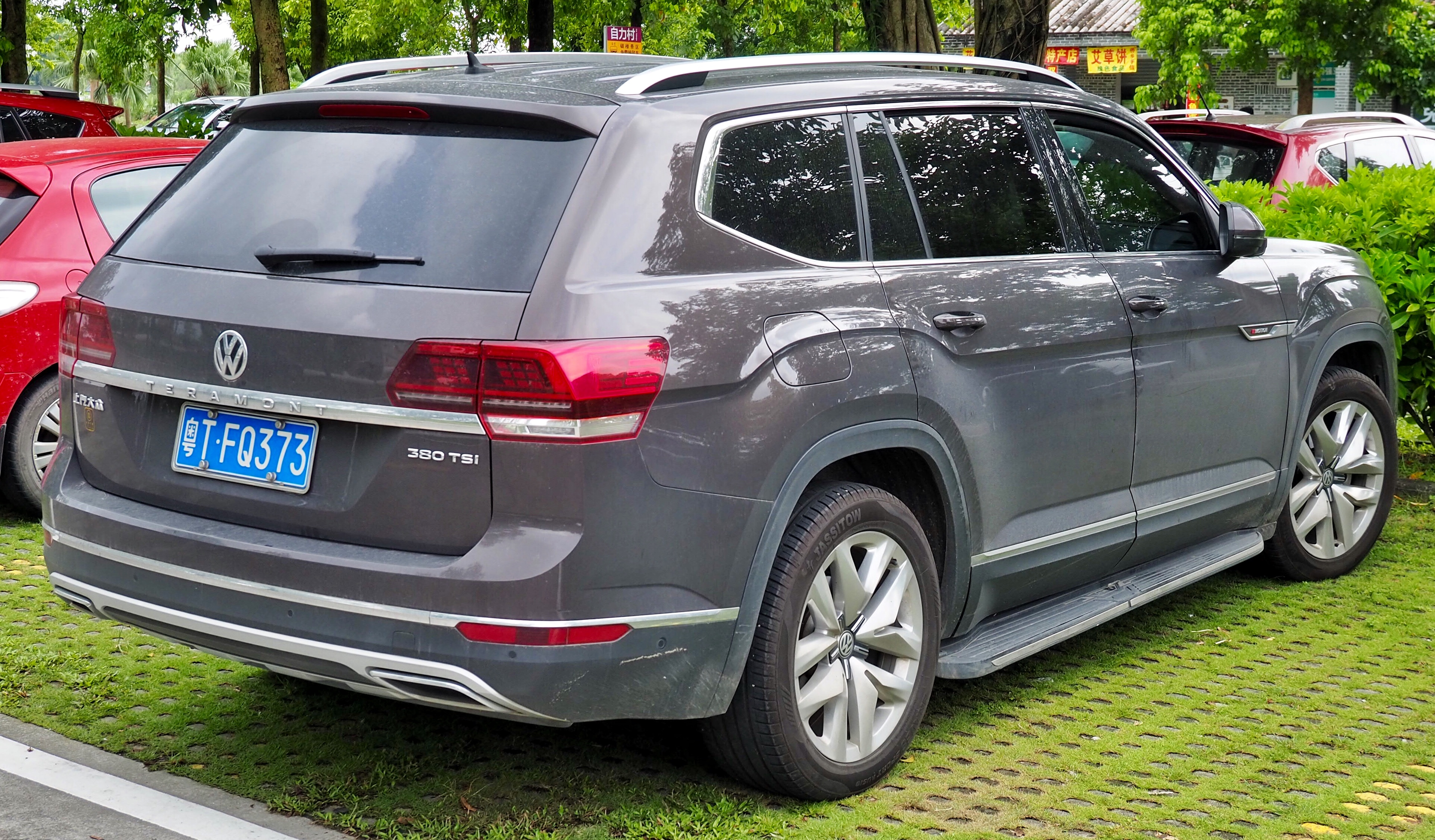
Volkswagen Teramont (China)

==== Engines ====
Gasoline engines
Model	Displacement	Series	Power	Torque	Transmission
2.0 '330 TSI'	1,984 cc (121.1 cu in) I4	EA888 (DPL)	186 PS (183 hp; 137 kW)	320 N⋅m (236 lb⋅ft)	7-speed DSG
2.0 '380 TSI'	1,984 cc (121.1 cu in) I4	EA888 (DKX)	220 PS (217 hp; 162 kW)	350 N⋅m (258 lb⋅ft)	7-speed DSG
2.5 '530 V6'	2,492 cc (152.1 cu in) VR6	EA390 (DPK/DDK)	299 PS (295 hp; 220 kW)	500 N⋅m (369 lb⋅ft)	7-speed DSG

==== Facelift ====
At the 2021 Shanghai Auto Show, Volkswagen unveiled the refreshed Teramont for the model year of 2021 in China. Changes include a new front end, redesigned wheels, and new full-width rear lights. It was introduced alongside the introduction of the Teramont X 2021 facelift.

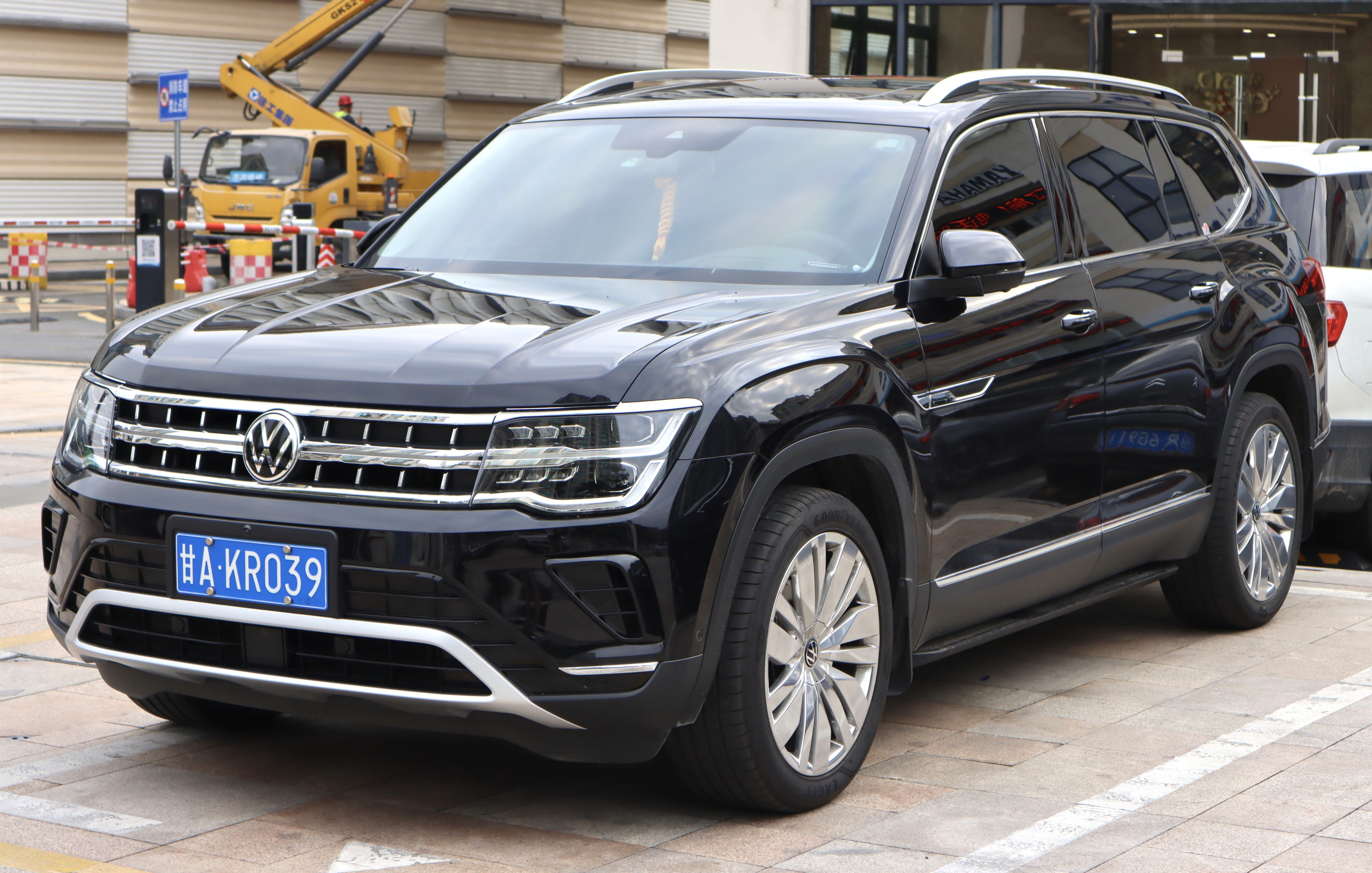
Facelift

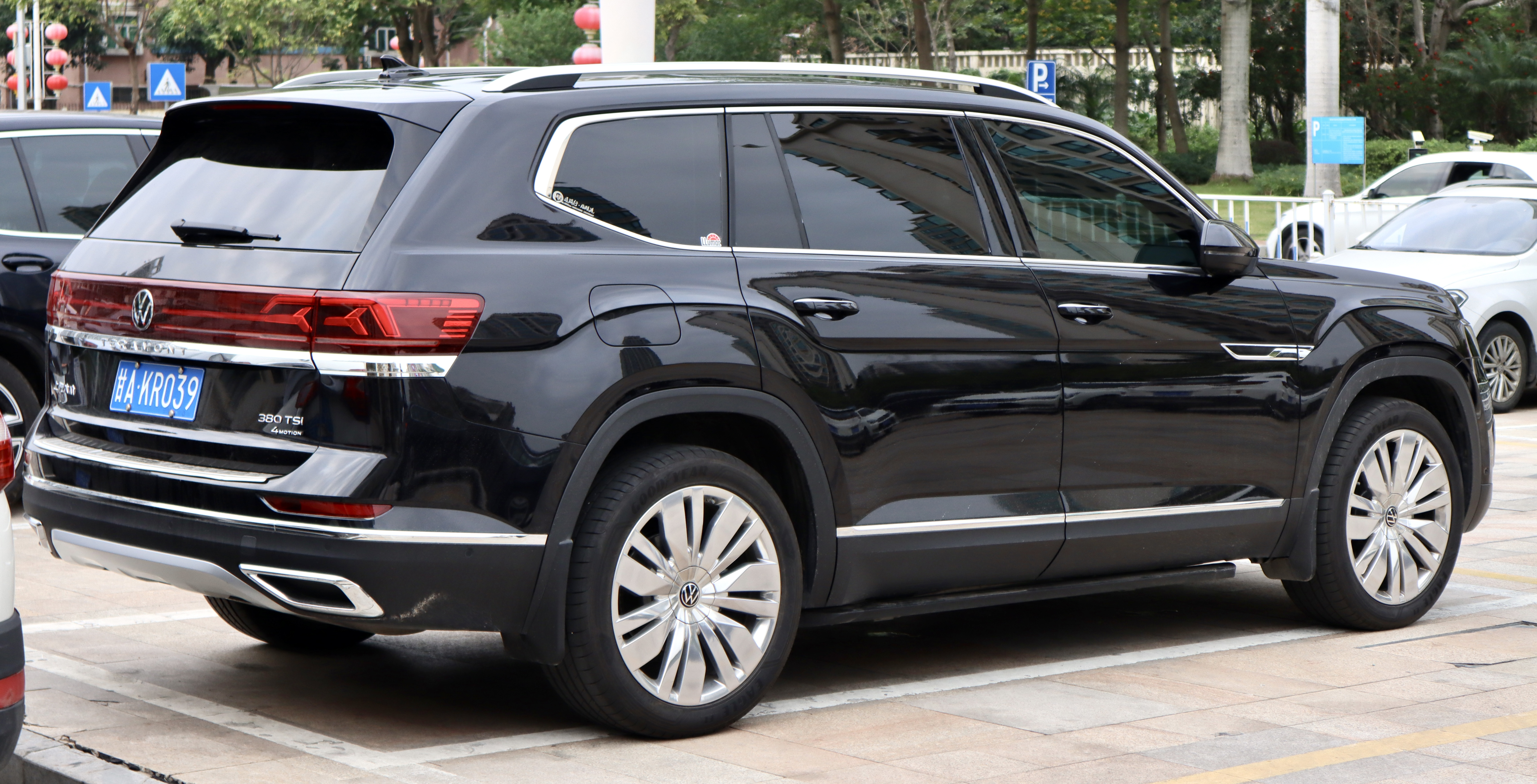
Rear view

=== Two-row versions ===
The Atlas Cross Sport (called Teramont X in China and Teramont Cross Sport in Mexico) is a smaller variation of the Atlas/Teramont. The 4.97 meter long vehicle has the same wheelbase (2.98 meters) as the three-row model, but has a lower roof and angled rear window to give it a sportier appearance and is only available with two rows of seating instead of three.

==== North America (Atlas Cross Sport) ====
The Atlas Cross Sport debuted in North America in early 2020, as a new model for the 2020 model year. Available engines are the same as the original Atlas: a turbocharged four-cylinder and a VR6. The Atlas Cross Sport is offered in S, SE, SEL, SEL R-Line, SEL Premium, and SEL Premium R-Line trims. The Cross Sport was previewed by the concept CrossBlue Coupe in September 2013. This Atlas Cross Sport, known in Mexico as the Teramont Cross Sport, was introduced for the Mexican market on December 1, 2020, alongside the facelifted Teramont. It is only sold in the Highline trim level and it is equipped with the R-Line aerodynamic kit.

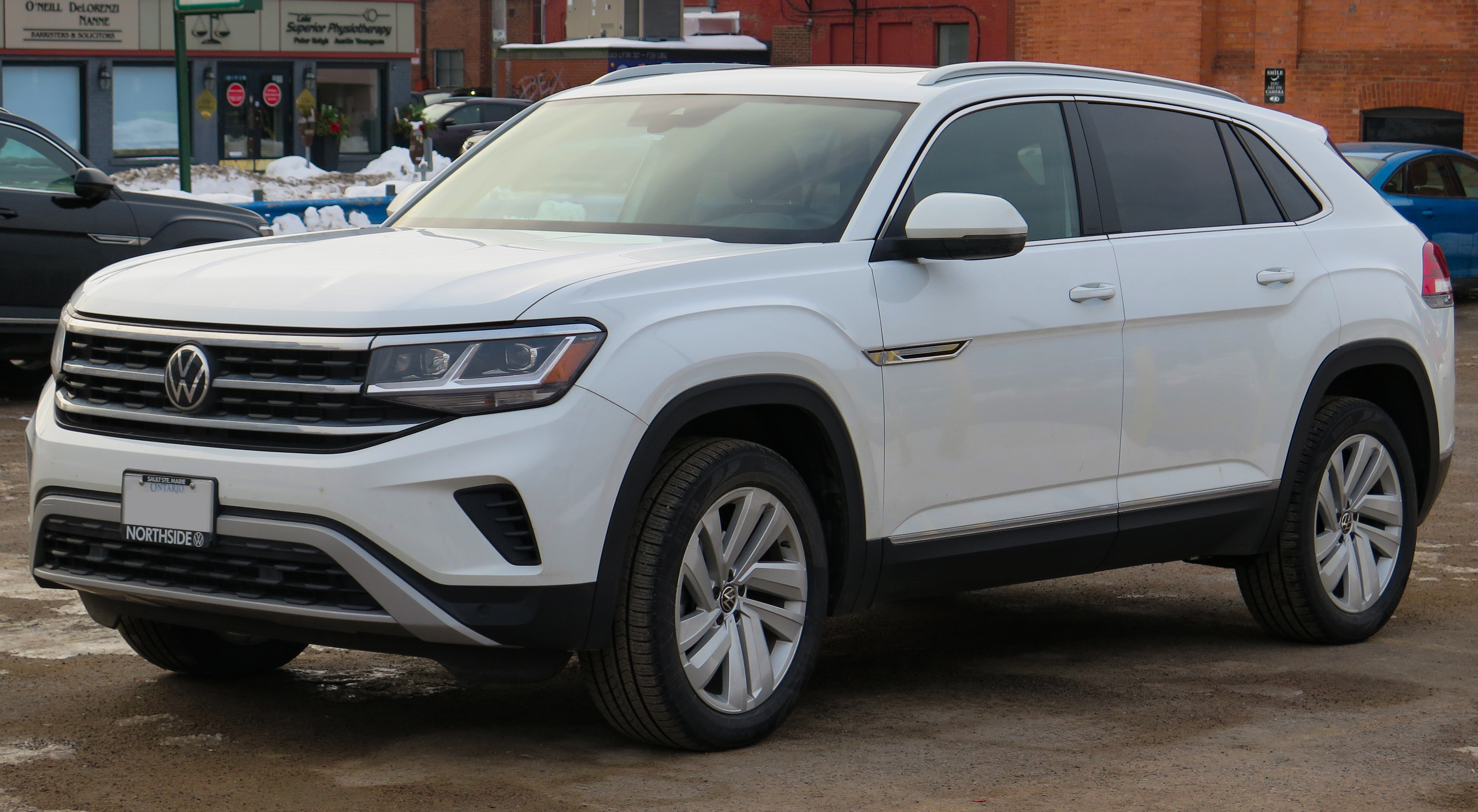
Atlas Cross Sport

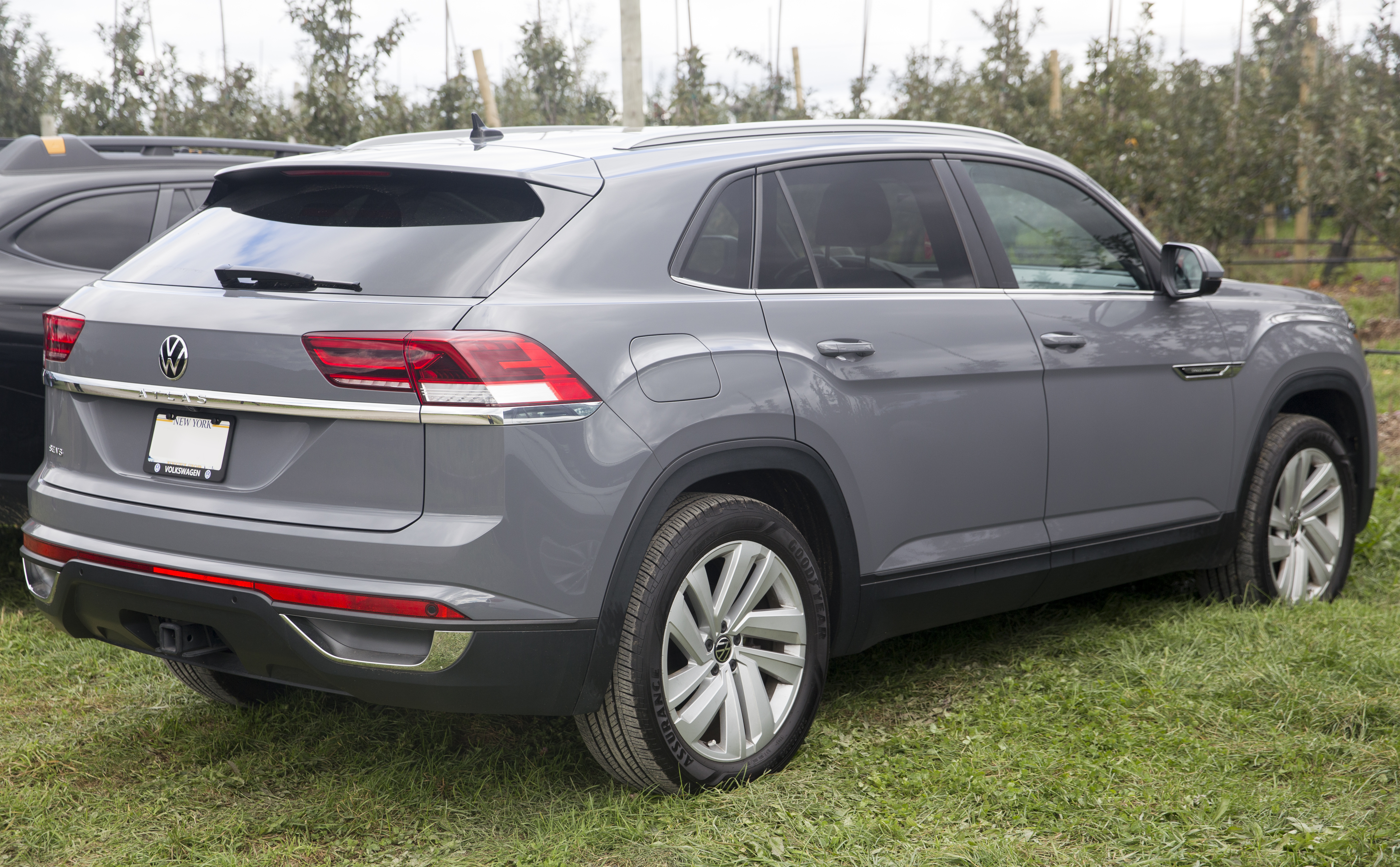
Rear view

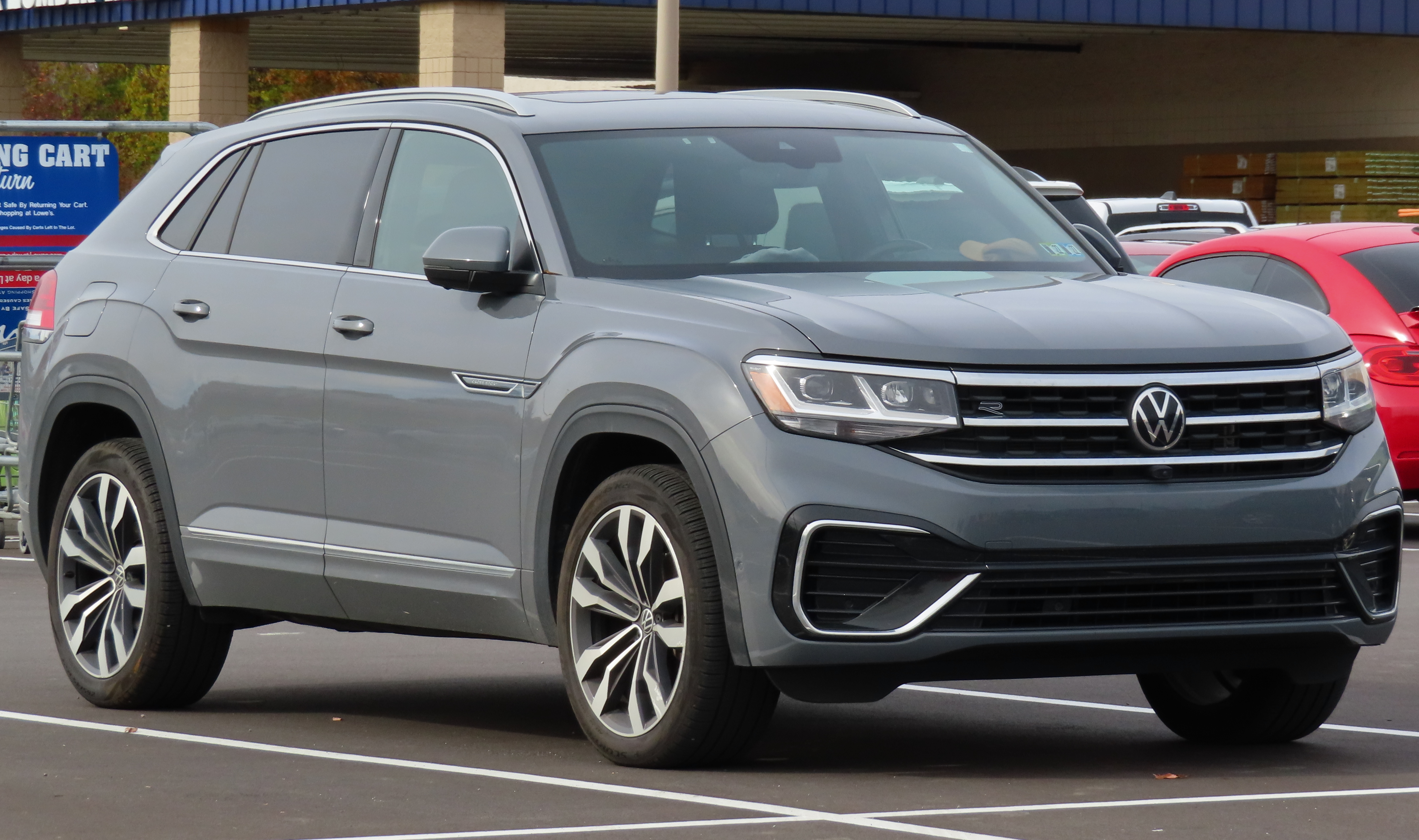
R-Line

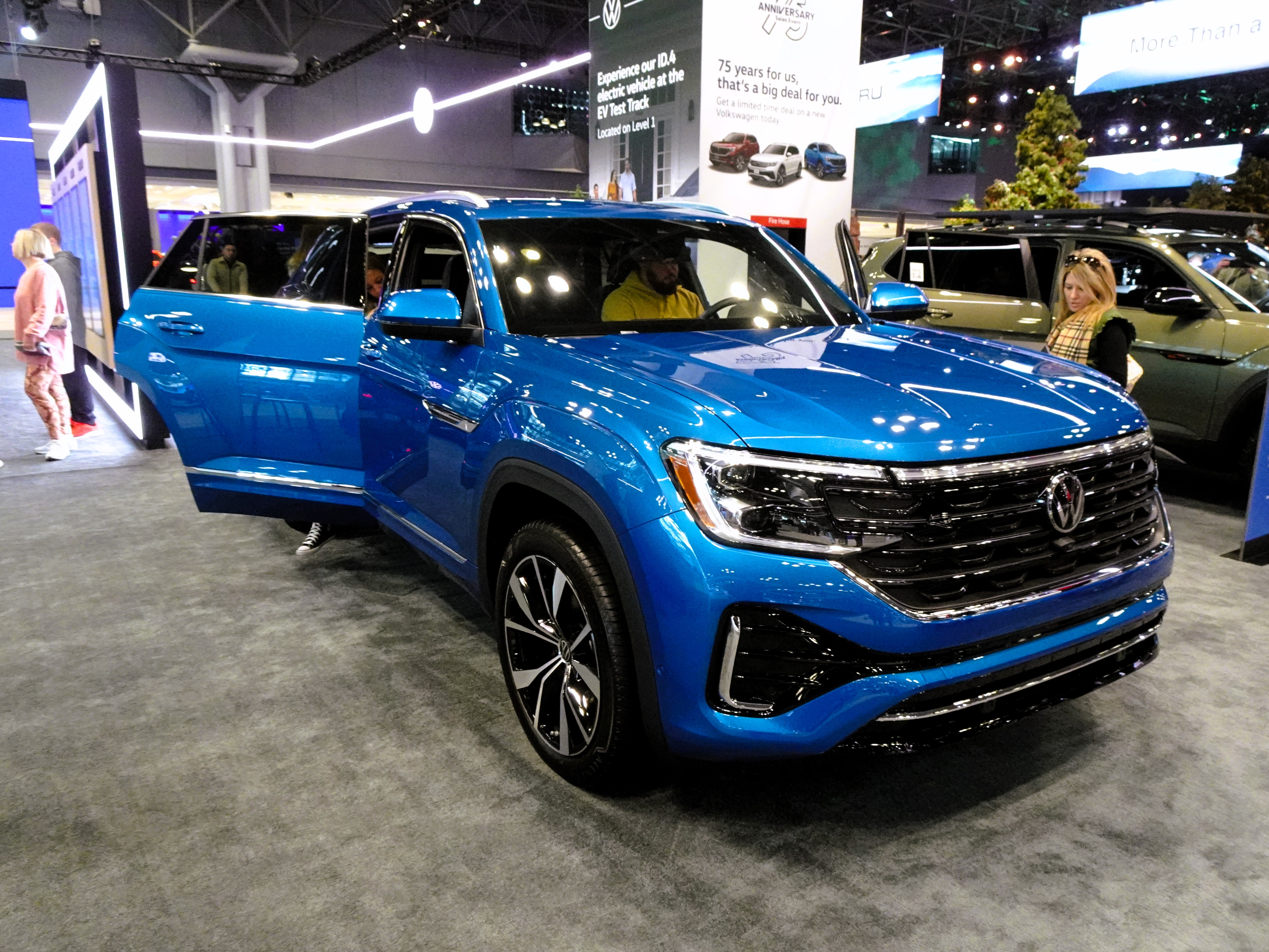
Facelift

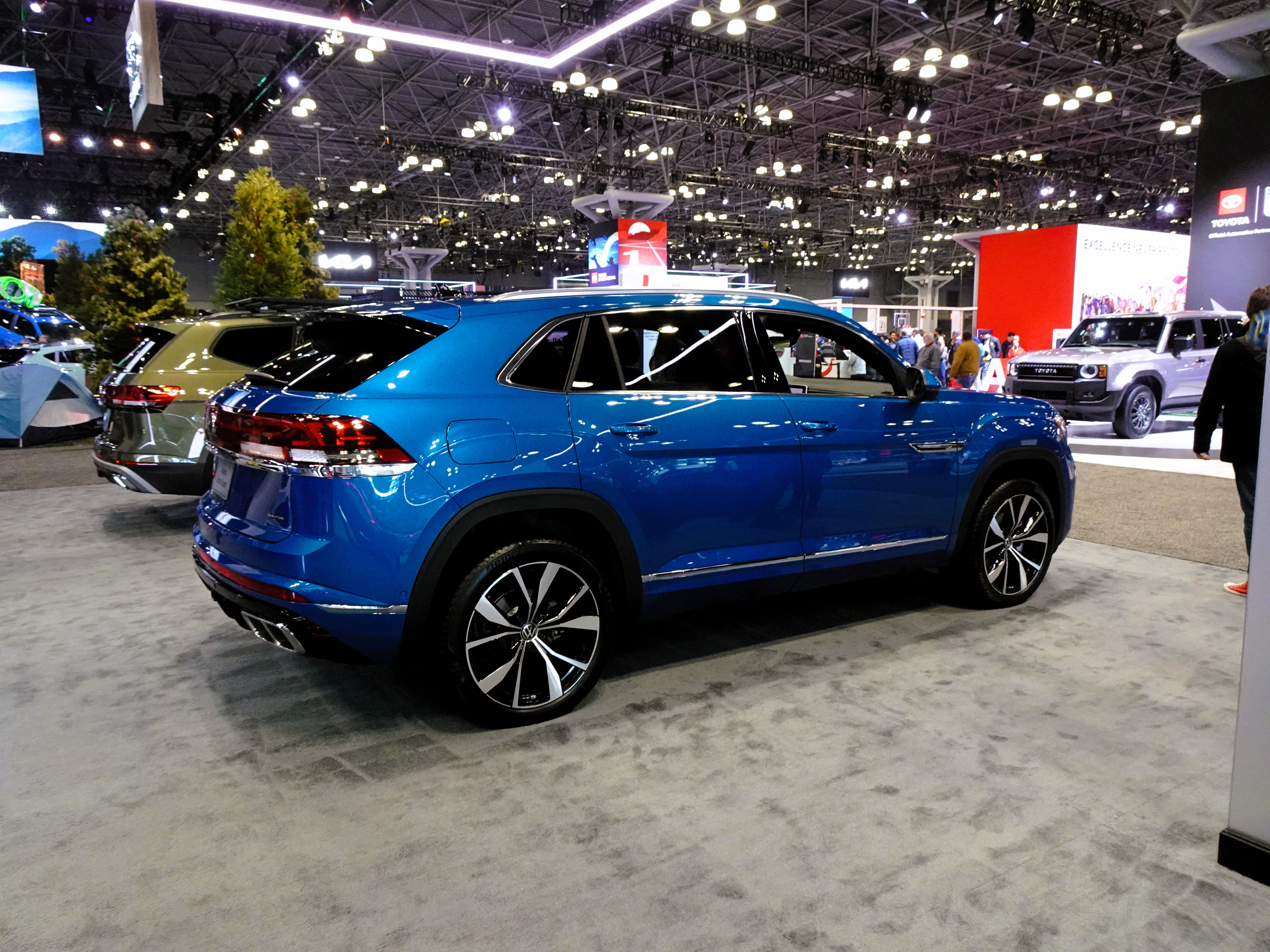
Rear view

==== China (Teramont X) ====
The Teramont X was unveiled in April 2019 in 2019 Shanghai Auto Show. It positioned as a coupé version of the Teramont in the Chinese market. The engine options is also shared with the standard Teramont, however all Teramont X models have four-wheel drive as standard. It features a different front fascia compared to the North American Atlas Cross Sport. Debuting alongside the Teramont 2021 model year facelift, the Teramont X in China received a facelift for the 2021 model year, and another facelift for the 2023 model year.

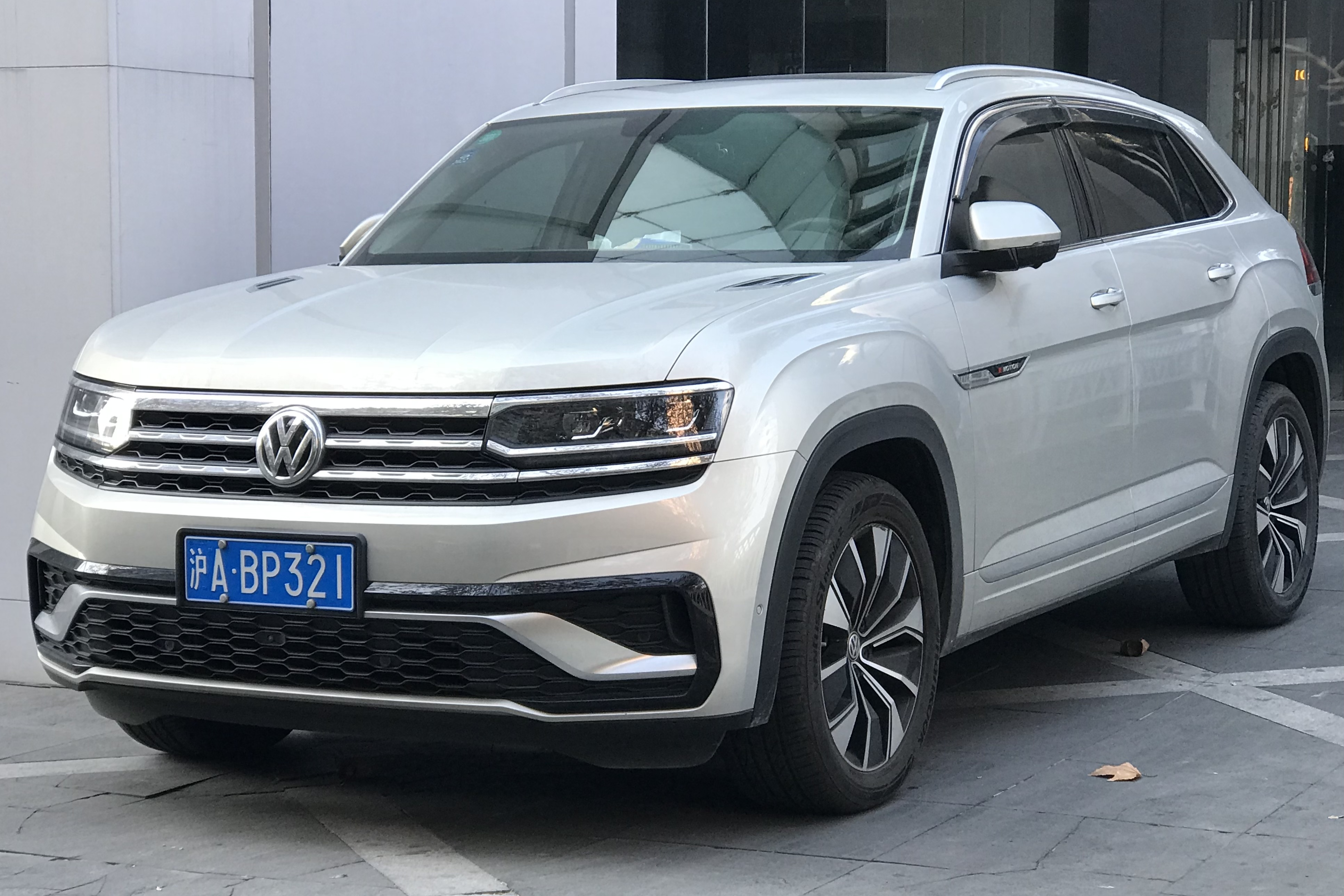
Teramont X (China)

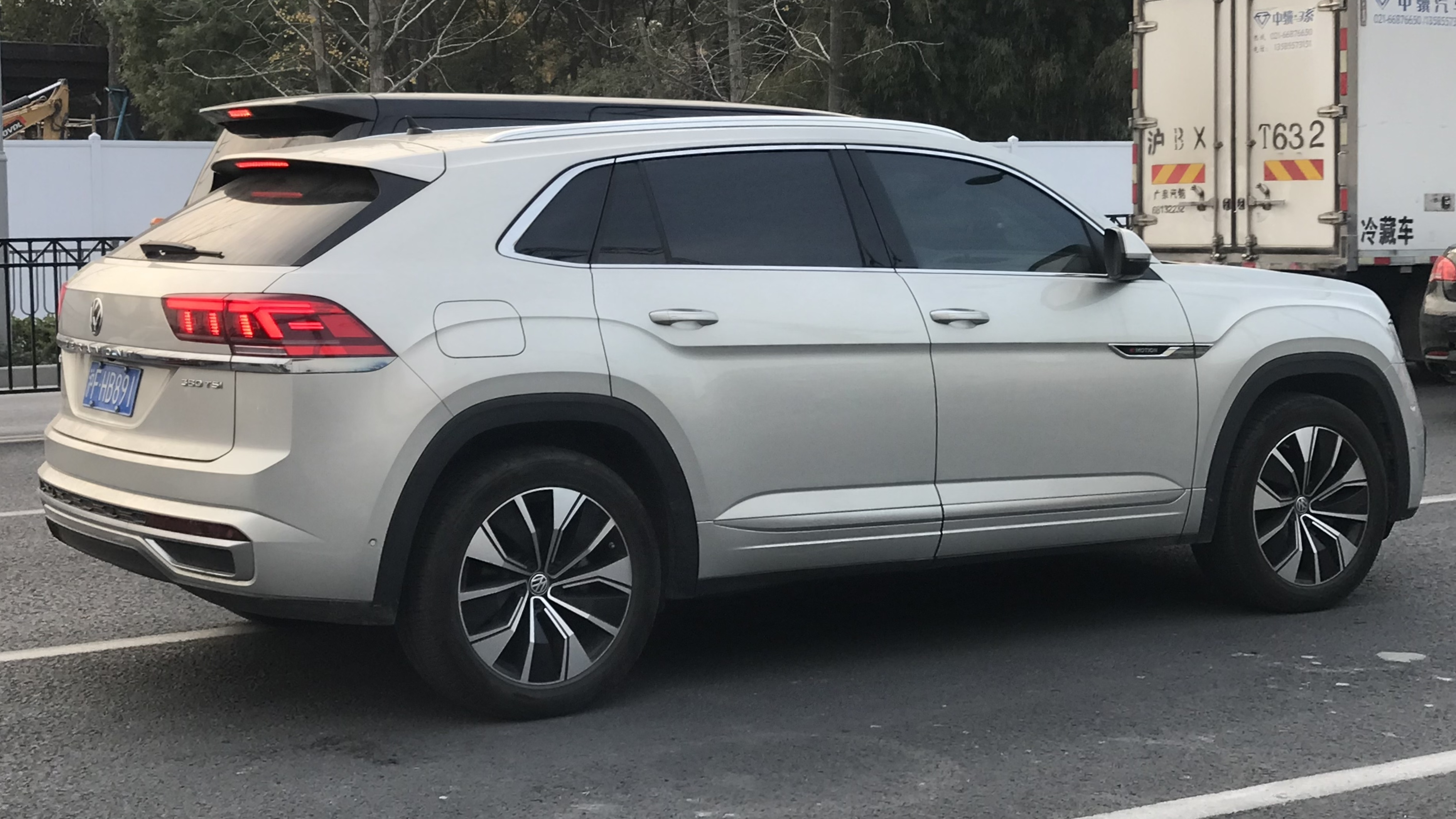
Rear view
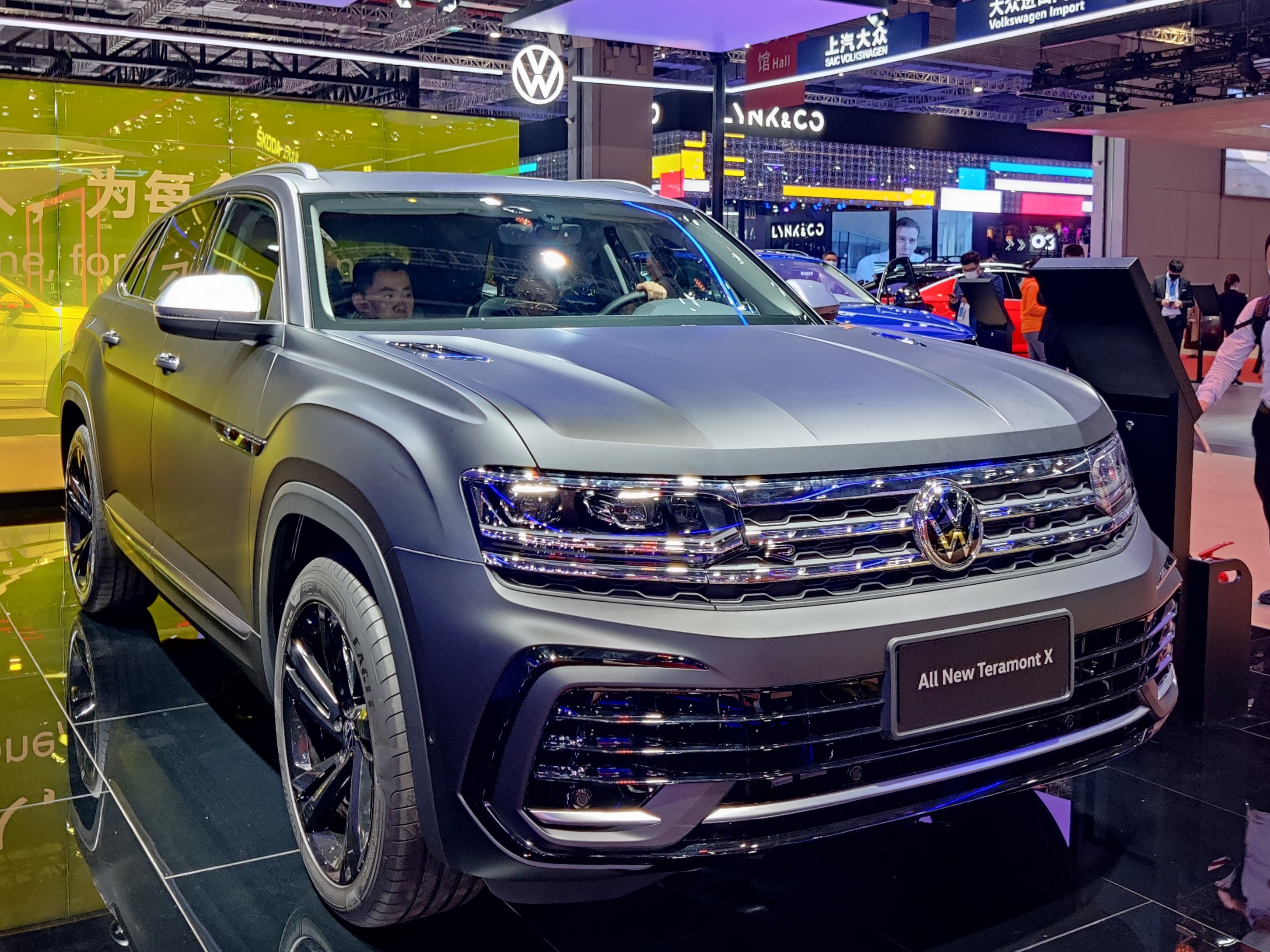
Teramont X (China, facelift)

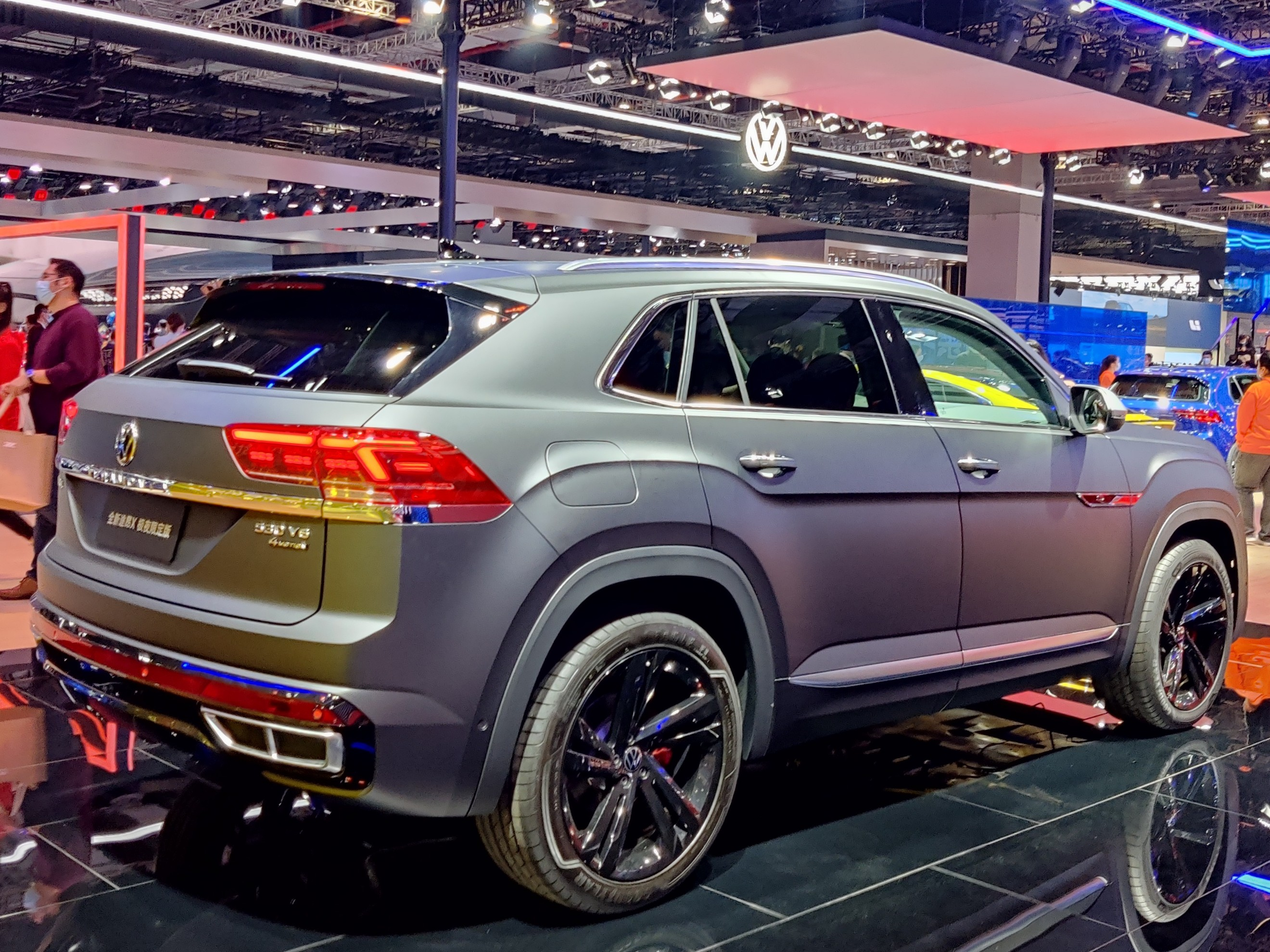
Rear view
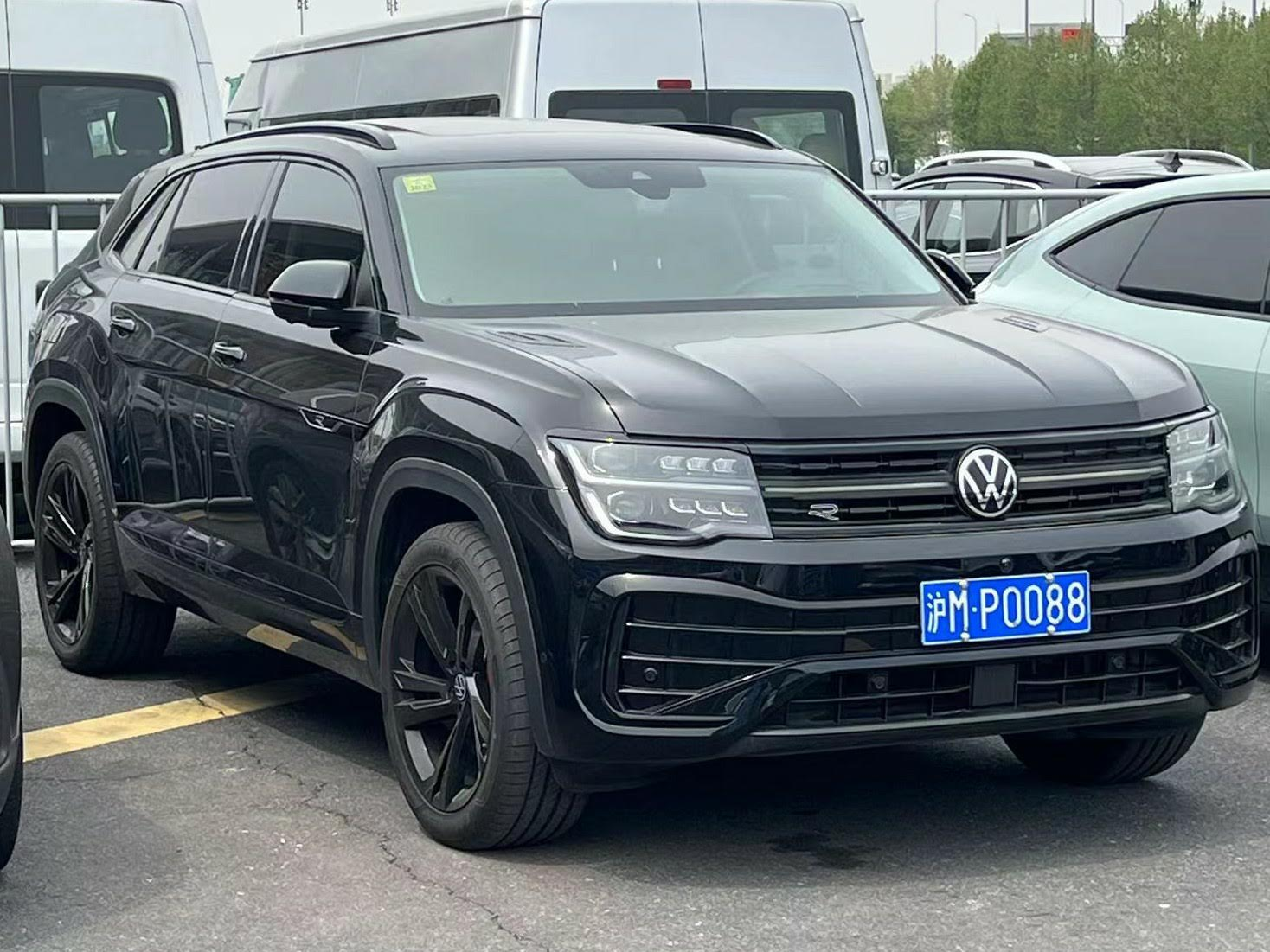
Teramont X (China, 2023 facelift)

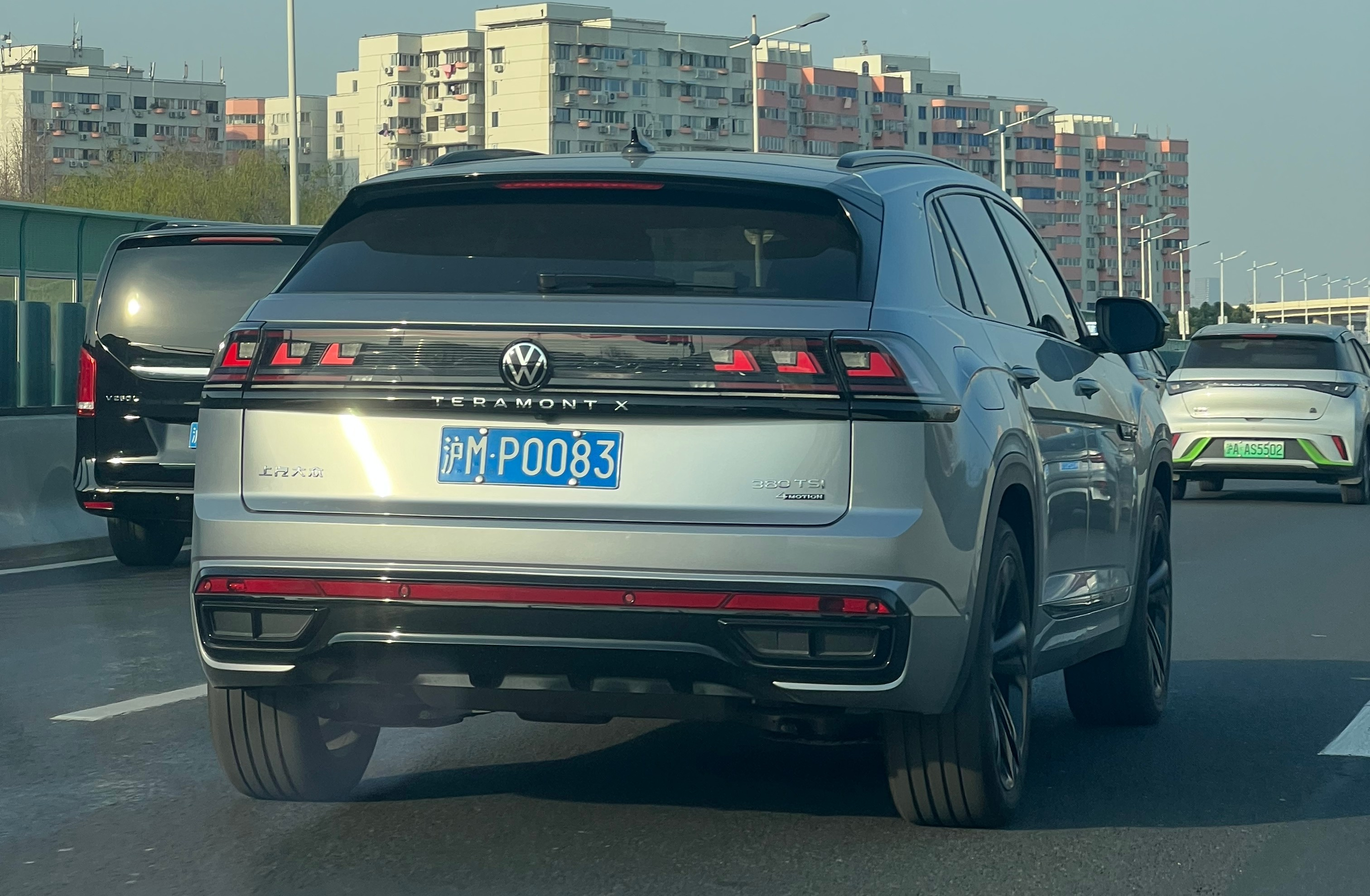
Rear view

== Second generation (2025) ==
Second generation
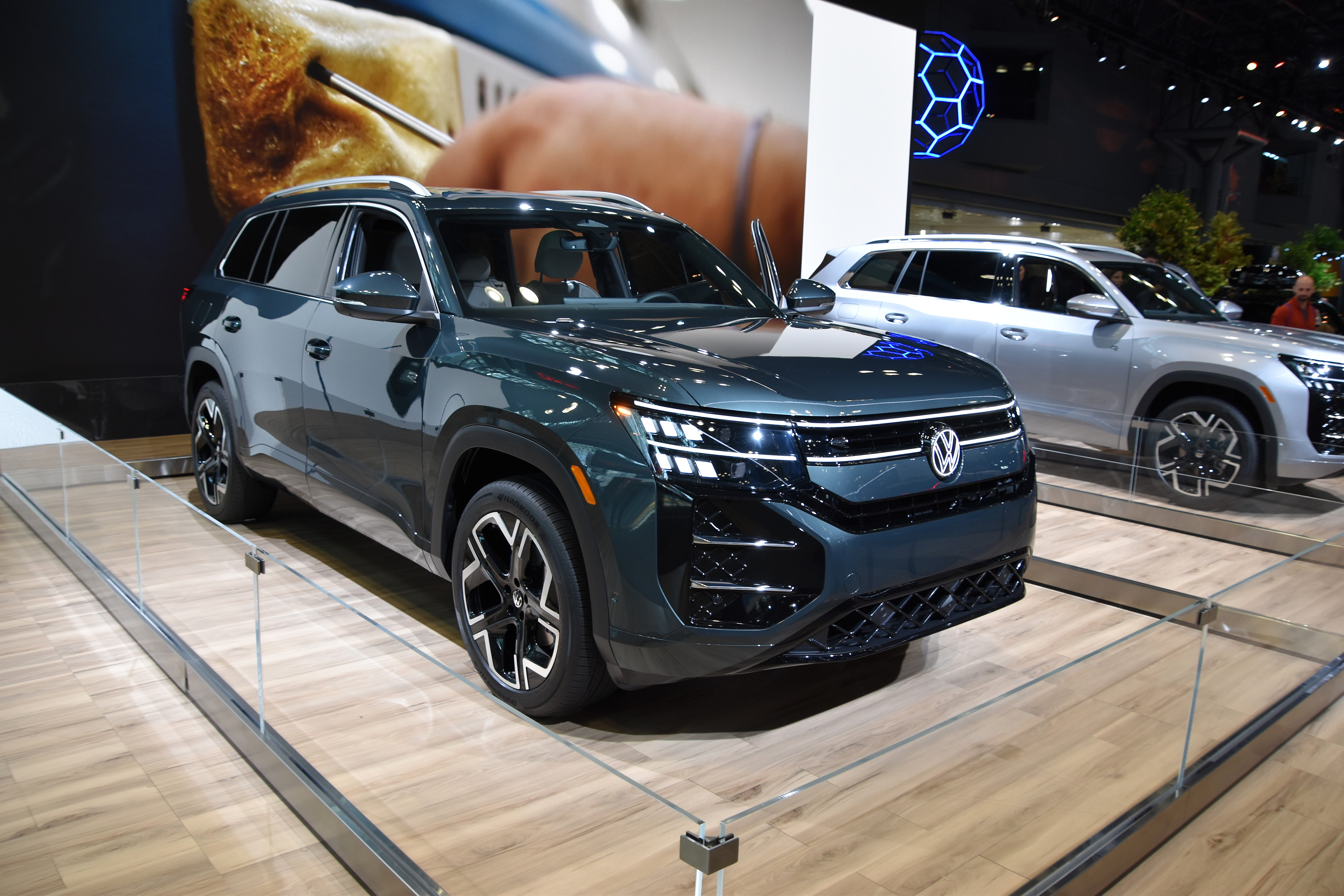
- Volkswagen Atlas R-Line

Overview
- Also called: Volkswagen Teramont Pro (China)
- Production: March 2025–present (China); September 2026–present (U.S.)
- Model years: 2027–
- Assembly: China: Ningbo, Zhejiang (SAIC-VW); United States: Chattanooga, Tennessee (Chattanooga Assembly Plant)
- Designer: William Lee

Body and chassis
- Layout: Front-engine, all-wheel-drive (4motion)
- Platform: MQB Evo platform

Powertrain
- Engine: 2.0 L I4 450TSI
- Transmission: 8-speed automatic (North America); 7-speed DSG (China)

Dimensions
- Wheelbase: 2,980 mm (117.3 in)
- Length: 5,158 mm (203.1 in); 4,970 mm (196 in) (two-row versions)
- Width: 1,991 mm (78.4 in)
- Height: 1,788 mm (70.4 in)
- Curb weight: 2,155 kg (4,751 lb)

The second generation was launched in 2025.

=== Markets ===
==== China (Teramont Pro) ====
In China, the Teramont Pro was unveiled on February 17, 2025. The Teramont Pro is made in China by the SAIC-Volkswagen joint venture for the Chinese market.

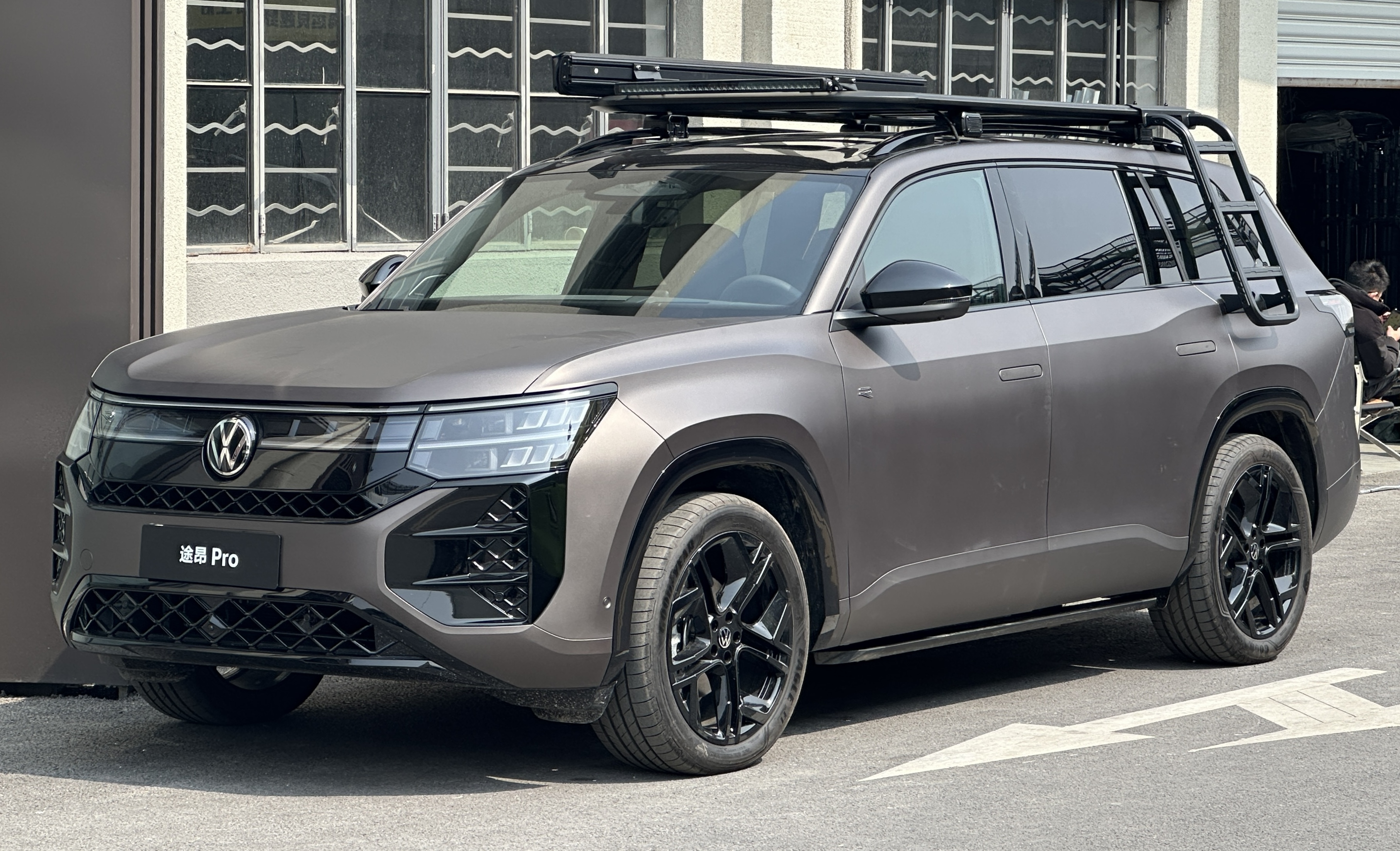
Volkswagen Teramont Pro front (China)

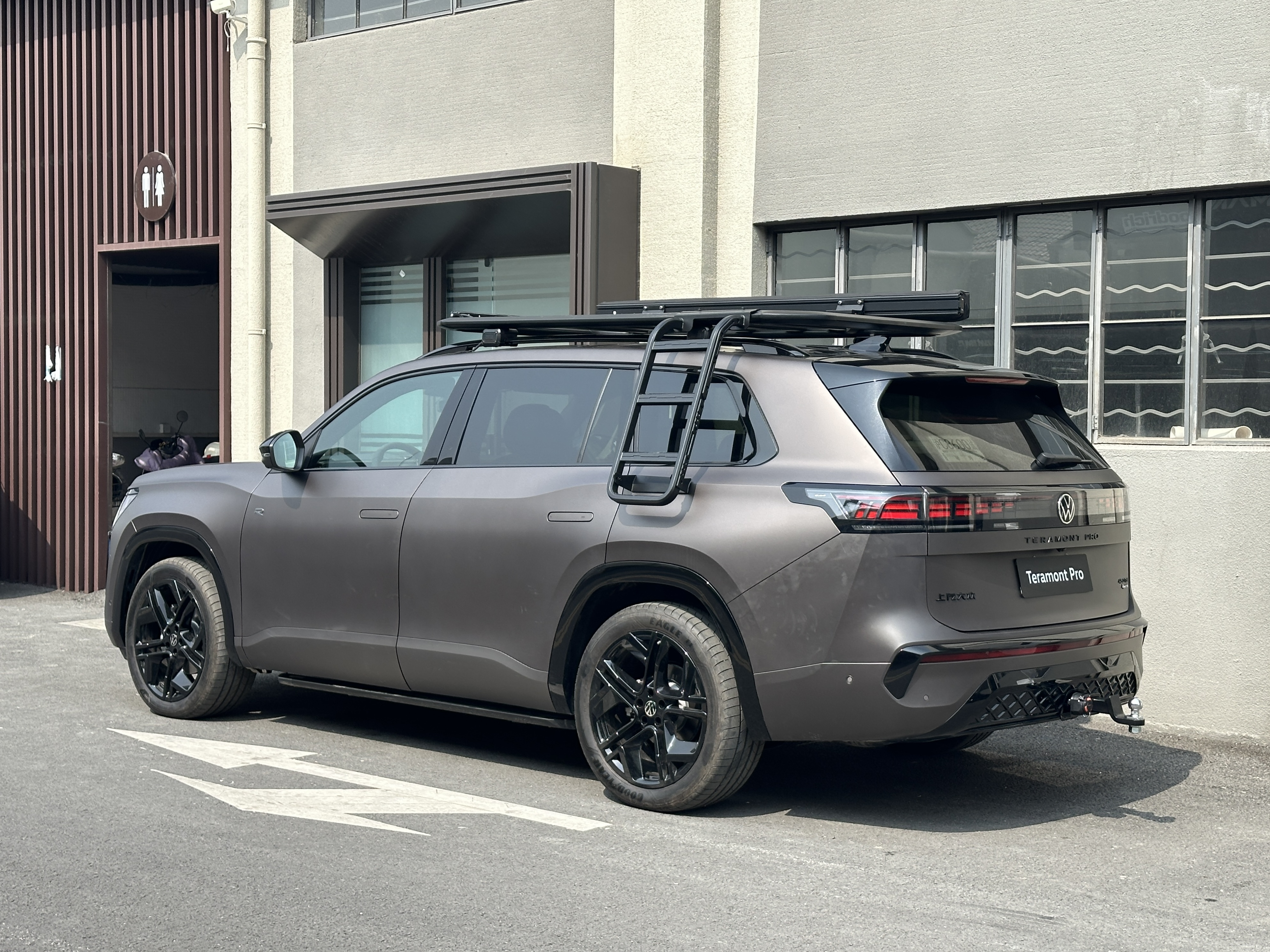
Volkswagen Teramont Pro rear (China)

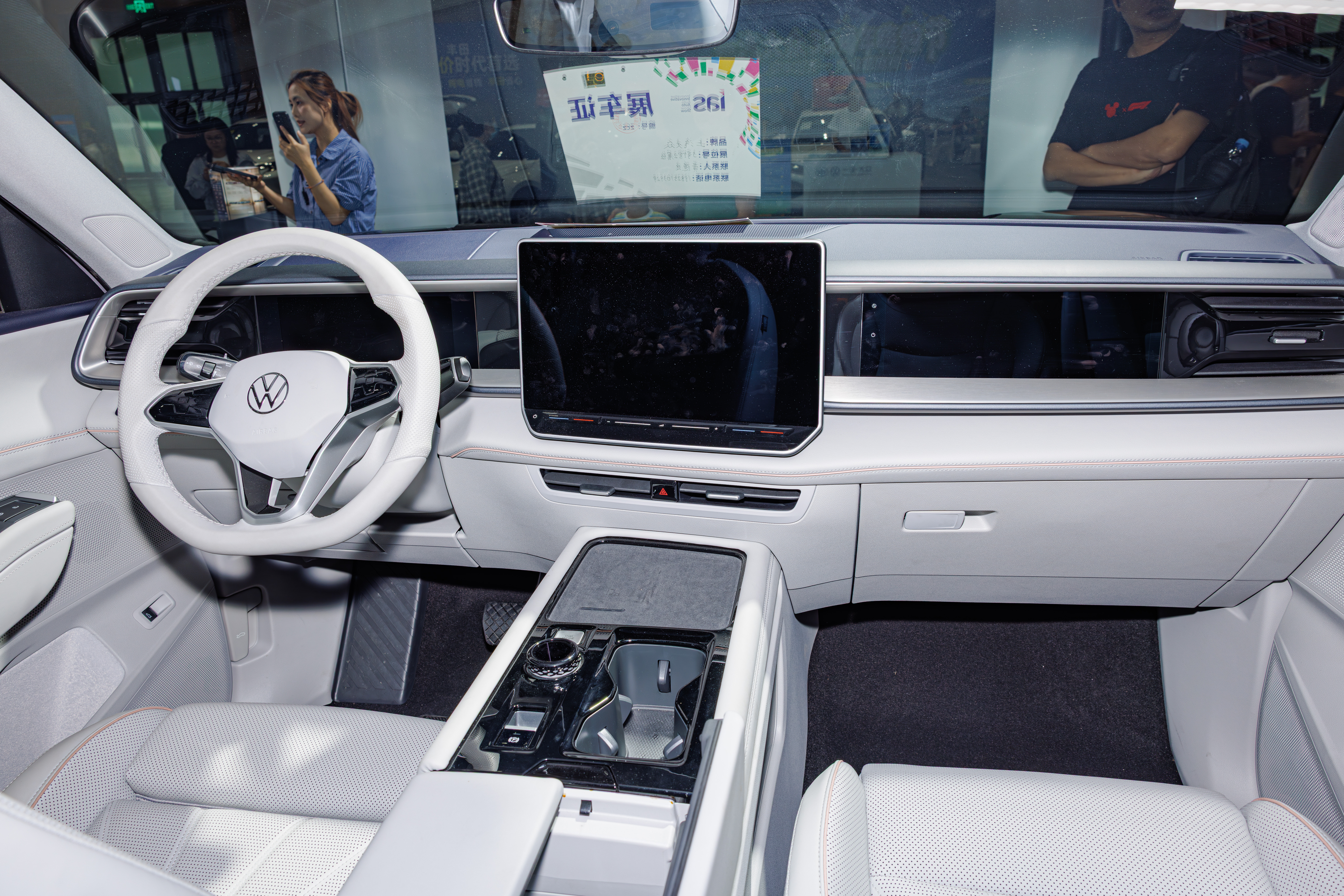
Volkswagen Teramont Pro Interior (China)

==== North America (Atlas and Atlas Cross Sport) ====
The Atlas was introduced on 31 March 2026. Its first autoshow debut at the New York Auto Show in New York on April 3, 2026.

The second generation Atlas Cross Sport was revealed on 10 August 2026. Compared to the three-row version, it has a greenhouse shortened by 2.1 in (53 mm), a wheelbase shortened by 5.4 in (140 mm), and a windscreen with increased rake.

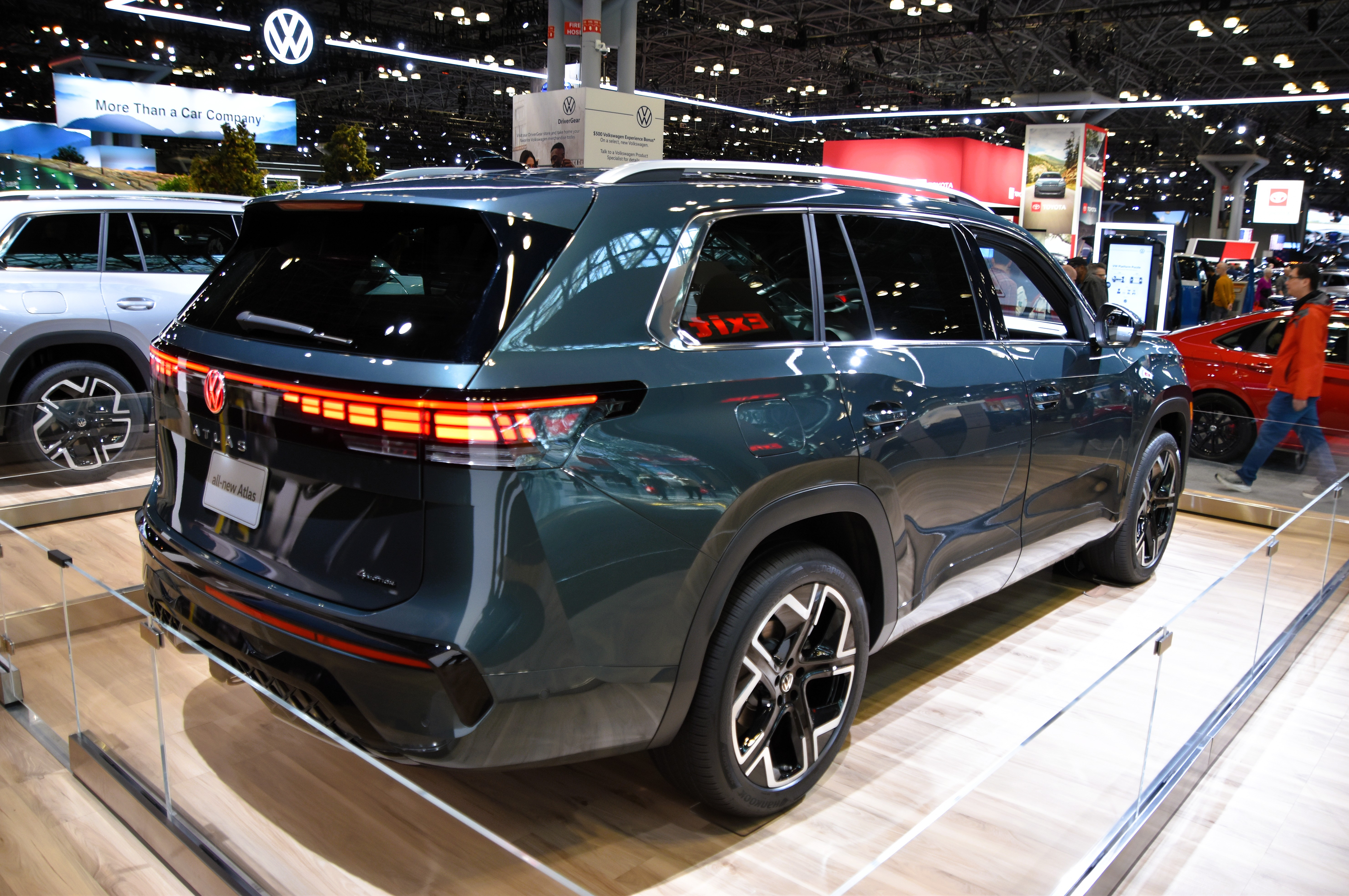
Atlas rear (China)

== Production and sales ==
Year	Sales					Global production
Year	United States		Mexico		China	Global production
Year	Atlas	Atlas Cross Sport	Teramont	Cross Sport	Teramont/ Teramont X	Global production
2016						386
2017	27,119				75,114	129,724
2018	59,677		1,119		86,182	166,034
2019	81,508		1,821		84,003	183,648
2020	59,422	29,069	767	63	76,817	178,954
2021	72,384	43,303	1,158	625	54,589	180,873
2022	53,545	28,480				217,771
2023	60,859	34,816			47,602	
2024	75,516	38,871			54,118	
2025	71,044	31,564			36,590	
