= Volkswagen CrossBlue =

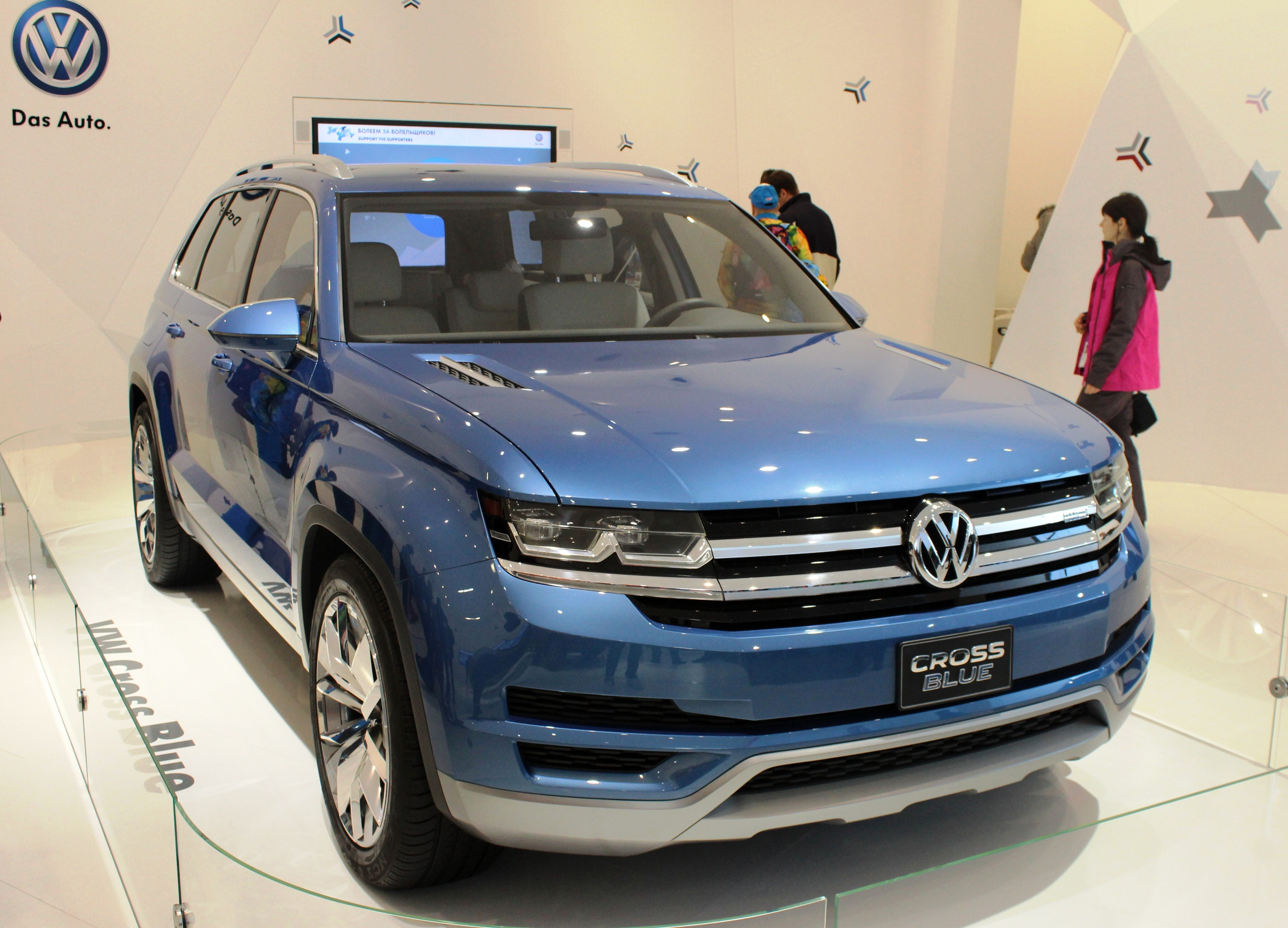

Overview
- Manufacturer: Volkswagen

Body and chassis
- Class: Concept Mid-size crossover SUV
- Body style: 5-door SUV (CrossBlue); 5-door coupé SUV (CrossBlue Coupé)
- Layout: Front engine, four-wheel drive (4MOTION® electric AWD system) gasoline engine powers front wheels. Rear wheels driven by electric motors.
- Platform: VW Group MQB platform
- Related: Volkswagen Atlas; Volkswagen Tiguan

Powertrain
- Engine: 2.0 L EA288 I4 BiTDI; 3.0 L EA839 V6 24v TFSI
- Electric motor: 2x AC permanent-magnet synchronous electric motor: Front: 40 kW (54.4 PS; 53.6 hp); Rear: 85 kW (115.6 PS; 114.0 hp); Total: 125 kW (170.0 PS; 167.6 hp)
- Power output: 224 kW (304.6 PS; 300.4 hp) (CrossBlue); 305 kW (414.7 PS; 409.0 hp) (CrossBlue Coupé)
- Transmission: 6-speed DSG-e
- Hybrid drivetrain: PHEV
- Battery: Li-ion: 9.8 kWh (CrossBlue); 9.9 kWh (CrossBlue Coupé)

Dimensions
- Wheelbase: 117.323 in (2,980 mm)
- Length: 196.34 in (4,987 mm)
- Width: 79.33 in (2,015 mm)
- Height: 68.23 in (1,733 mm)

The Volkswagen CrossBlue is a concept diesel plug-in-hybrid mid size crossover SUV, intended to sit in the range of SUVs by Volkswagen, below the Volkswagen Touareg. The concept version of the car has six seats, but the production version that will be based on it will have a traditional seven seat layout.

It is meant to replace the slow selling minivan, the Volkswagen Routan, and intended to be sold exclusively in the American and Canadian markets. However, Volkswagen of Australia is currently trying to convince Volkswagen executives to have the concept appear in Australian Auto Shows.

In the American and Canadian markets, its targeted competitors are the Toyota Highlander, Toyota 4Runner, Ford Explorer, and Honda Pilot. On July 14, 2014, Volkswagen announced that the CrossBlue will be built at its factory in Chattanooga, Tennessee.

The production version was announced with the name Atlas or Teramont for those manufactured in the US and Chinese markets for those manufactured in China. Atlas will feature transverse mounted engines of four cylinders or Volkswagens narrow angle V6.

== CrossBlue Coupé Concept ==
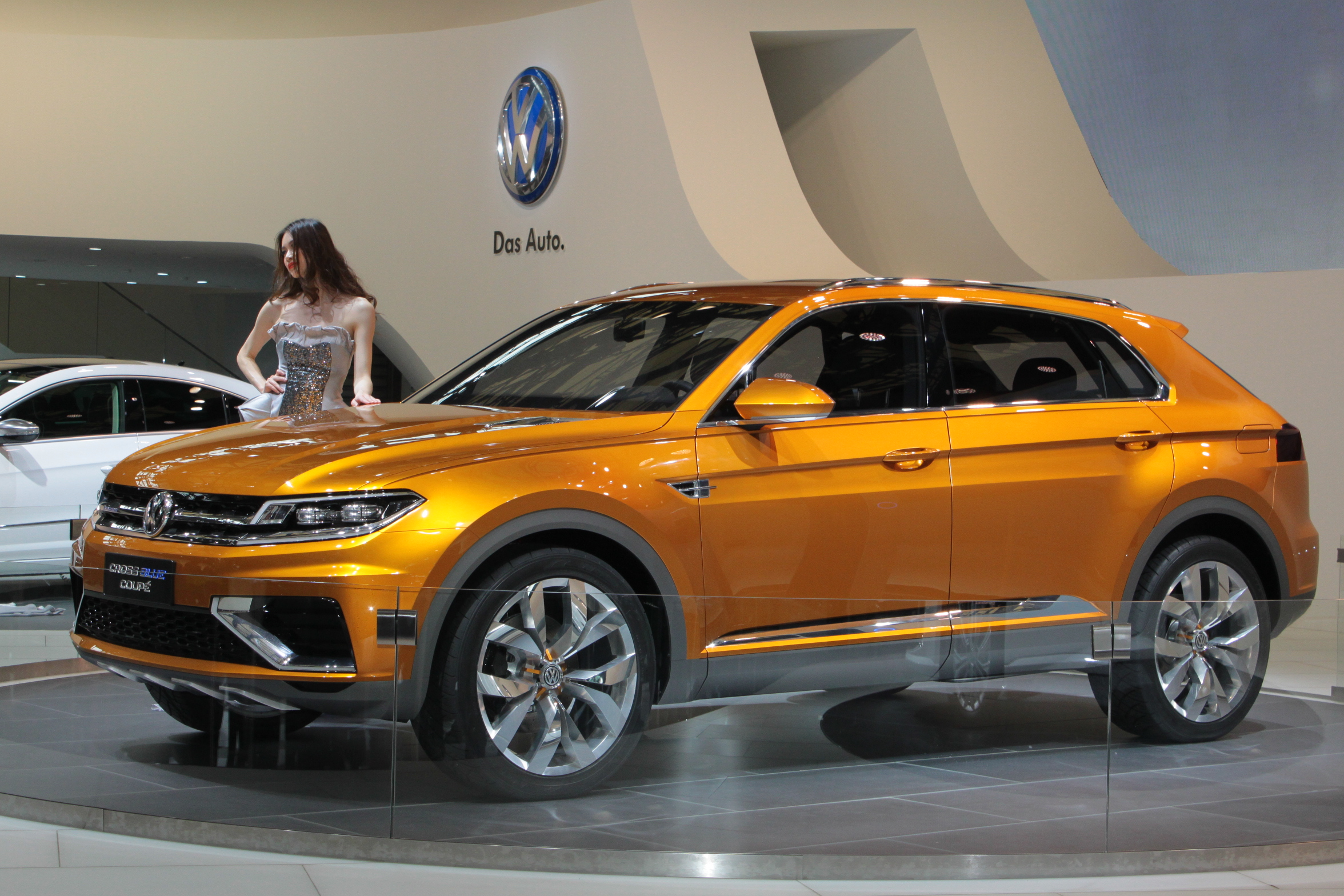
VW Cross Blue Coupé concept at Auto Shanghai 2013

At the September 2013 Auto Shanghai, Volkswagen revealed a different, sportier version of the car, named Volkswagen CrossBlue Coupé.
