= Volkswagen Passat (North America and China) =

Car model series

Volkswagen Passat (NMS)
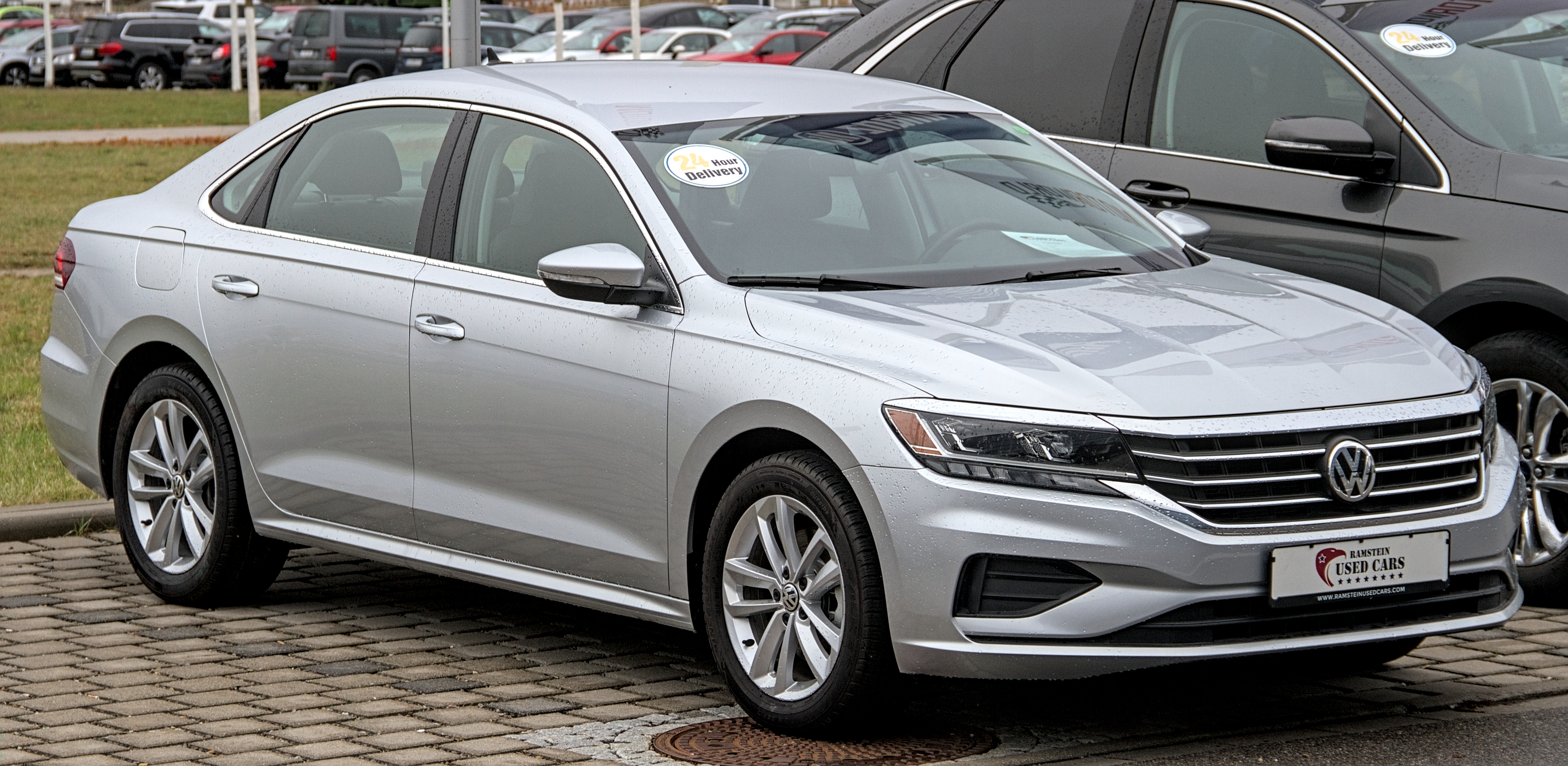
- Second-generation Passat (North America)

Overview
- Manufacturer: Volkswagen
- Production: 2011–present (China); 2011–2022 (United States)
- Model years: 2012–2022 (North America)

Body and chassis
- Class: Mid-size car (D)
- Body style: 4-door sedan
- Layout: Front-engine, front-wheel drive

Chronology
- Predecessor: Volkswagen Passat (B6); Volkswagen Passat Lingyu (China)
- Successor: Volkswagen Passat (Middle East)

The Volkswagen Passat for the North American and Chinese markets (internally designated Volkswagen New Midsize Sedan, or NMS while under development) is a mid-size sedan that debuted in January 2011 at the Detroit Auto Show. It replaced the B6 Passat in the North American market. The Passat NMS was marketed in North America, the Middle East, South Korea and China, with no wagon/estate version available. In China, it is sold alongside the long-wheelbase version of the European Passat known as the Magotan.

At its introduction, the Passat NMS was part of Volkswagen Group's strategy to sell over 800,000 vehicles per year in the North American market by 2018. While it is larger, the model is more downscale compared to the European-market Passat to achieve a lower price point in order to penetrate the mainstream mid-size sedan market in the North American market.

The second-generation Passat for North America and China diverged into two different models, both released in 2019. The North American Passat continued to use the same platform with the A32/A33 Passat NMS introduced in 2011, making it a reskinned version of its predecessor. The Chinese-market Passat launched in 2019 is built on a completely different platform, which is the Volkswagen Group MQB, and has been lengthened in wheelbase and overall length compared to its predecessor.

== First generation (A32/A33; 2011) ==
First generation (A32/A33)
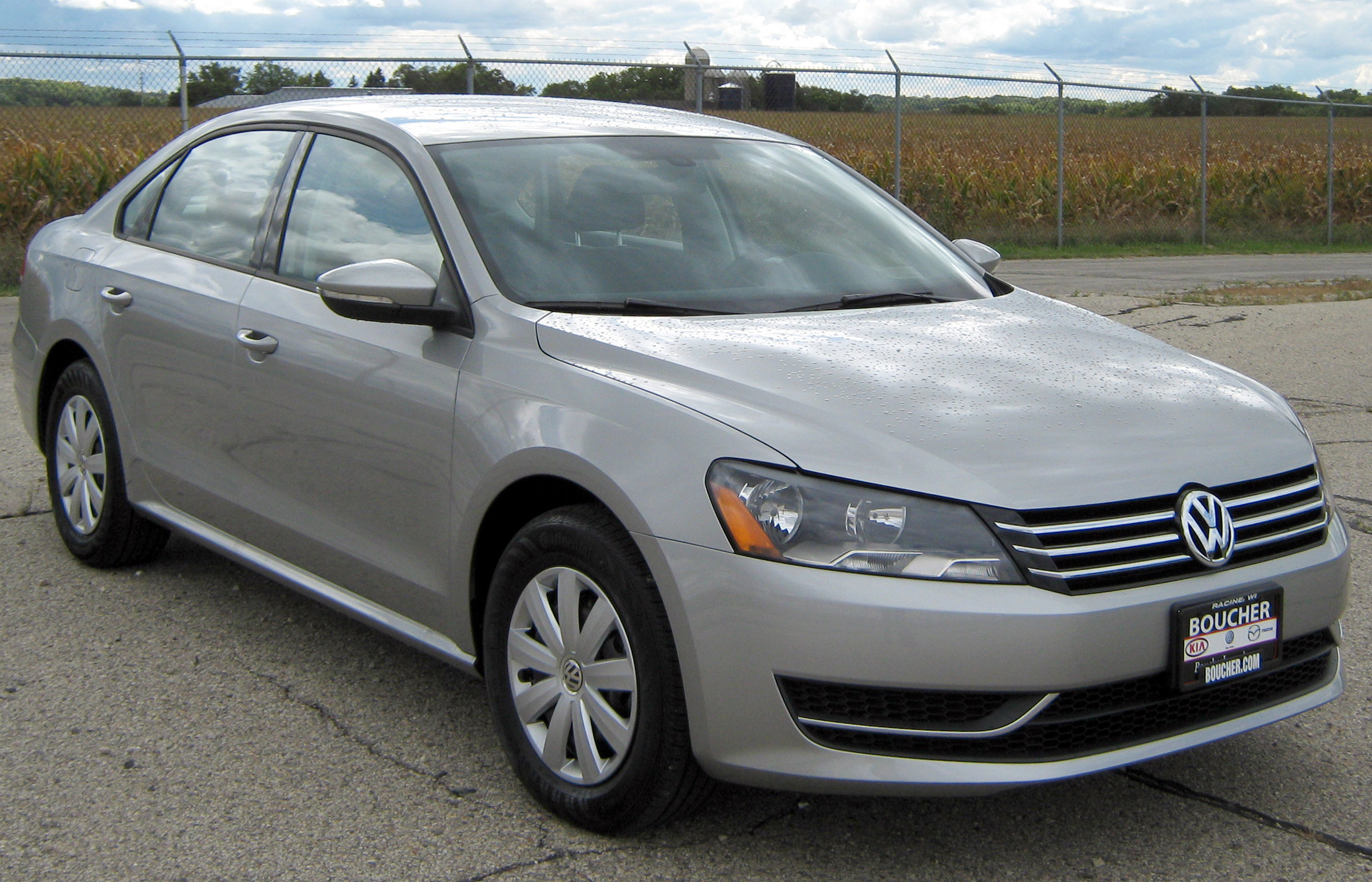

Overview
- Production: 2011–December 2021
- Model years: 2012–2019
- Assembly: United States: Chattanooga, Tennessee (Volkswagen Chattanooga Assembly Plant); China: Nanjing (SAIC-VW)
- Designer: Oliver Stefani

Body and chassis
- Platform: Volkswagen Group PQ46

Powertrain
- Engine: Gasoline: 1.4 L TSI I4; 1.8 L TSI I4; 2.0 L TSI I4; 2.5 L MPI I5; 3.0 L FSI VR6; 3.6 L FSI VR6; Diesel: 2.0 L TDI I4
- Transmission: 5-speed manual; 6-speed manual; 6-speed automatic; 6-speed DSG; 7-speed DSG

Dimensions
- Wheelbase: 2,803 mm (110.4 in)
- Length: 4,870 mm (191.7 in)
- Width: 1,834 mm (72.2 in)
- Height: 1,472 mm (58.0 in)

Volkswagen released a sketch of the Passat NMS in February 2009 and a more detailed, second sketch on 28 October 2009. The Passat NMS reflects a design language developed by Walter de Silva, the Italian design chief for the Volkswagen Group, and Klaus Bischoff, the German design leader for the Volkswagen brand. The Passat NMS interior borrows design elements from the European Passat, e.g., the traditional clock.

The vehicle was developed by SAIC-Volkswagen and Volkswagen Passenger Cars, and it sits on an extended version of the European car’s platform, which makes it 3.9 in (10 cm) longer, 0.5 in (1.3 cm) wider and therefore offers larger cabin space.

In the United States, it is produced in Volkswagen Group of America's new Chattanooga, Tennessee production facility using 80% US-sourced parts. The new facility is a "flex plant" which will allow for the production of vehicles based on the NMS and MQB platforms.

The American version of the 2013 model year Volkswagen Passat made its way to Middle Eastern markets, namely Qatar, Saudi Arabia, Oman and the United Arab Emirates, by the summer of 2012. The five-seater sedan is available in four trim levels, all with a 170 hp (172 PS; 127 kW) 2.5-litre 5-cylinder engine and an automatic transmission only. The Middle East received this engine until 2019.

In China, the new model is built by SAIC-Volkswagen at its Nanjing factory and is marketed as a more upscale model with some interior and exterior differences to the North American model, such as wood-trimmed steering wheel, rear air vents, and LED accented headlights.

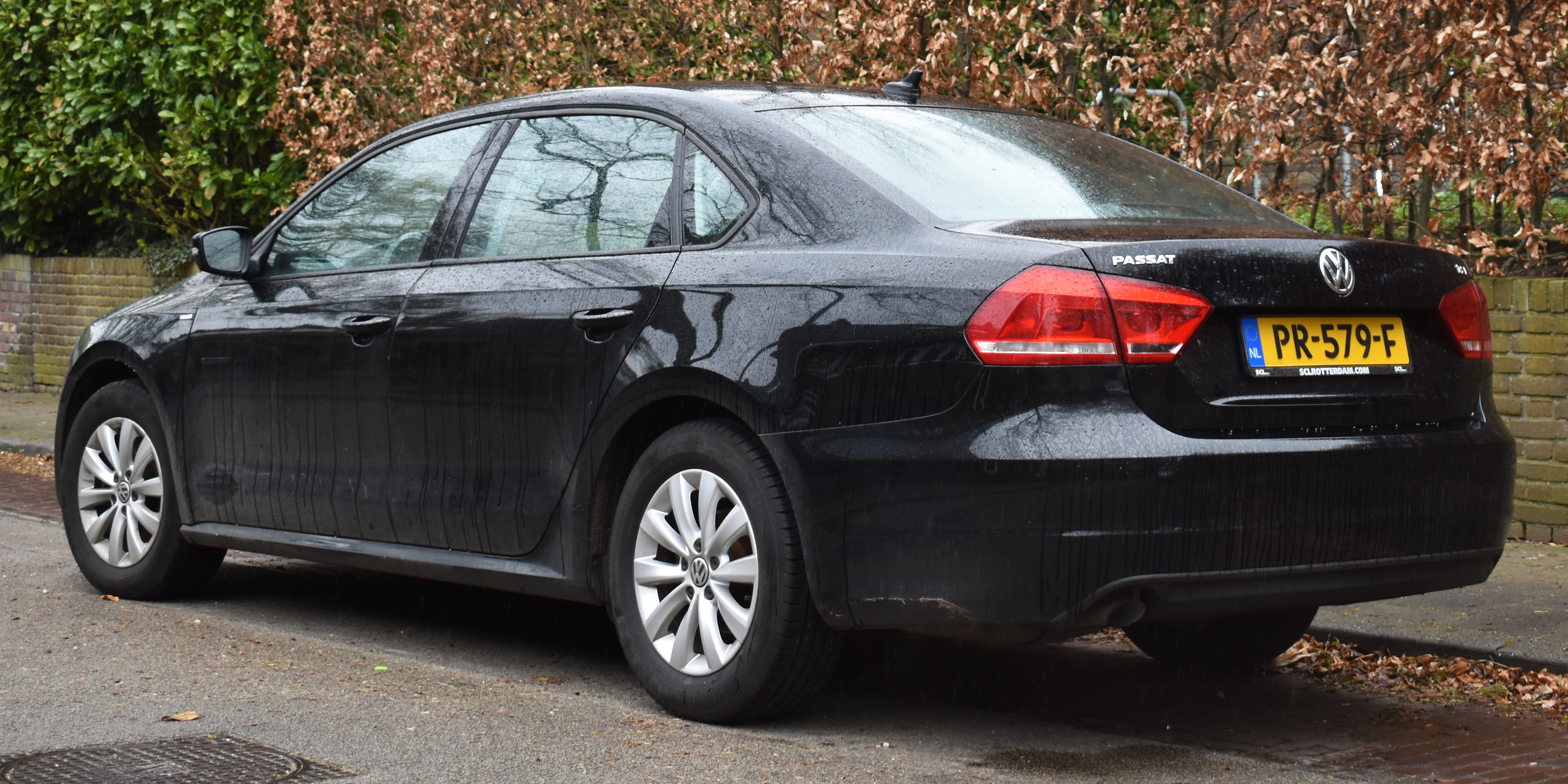
Rear view

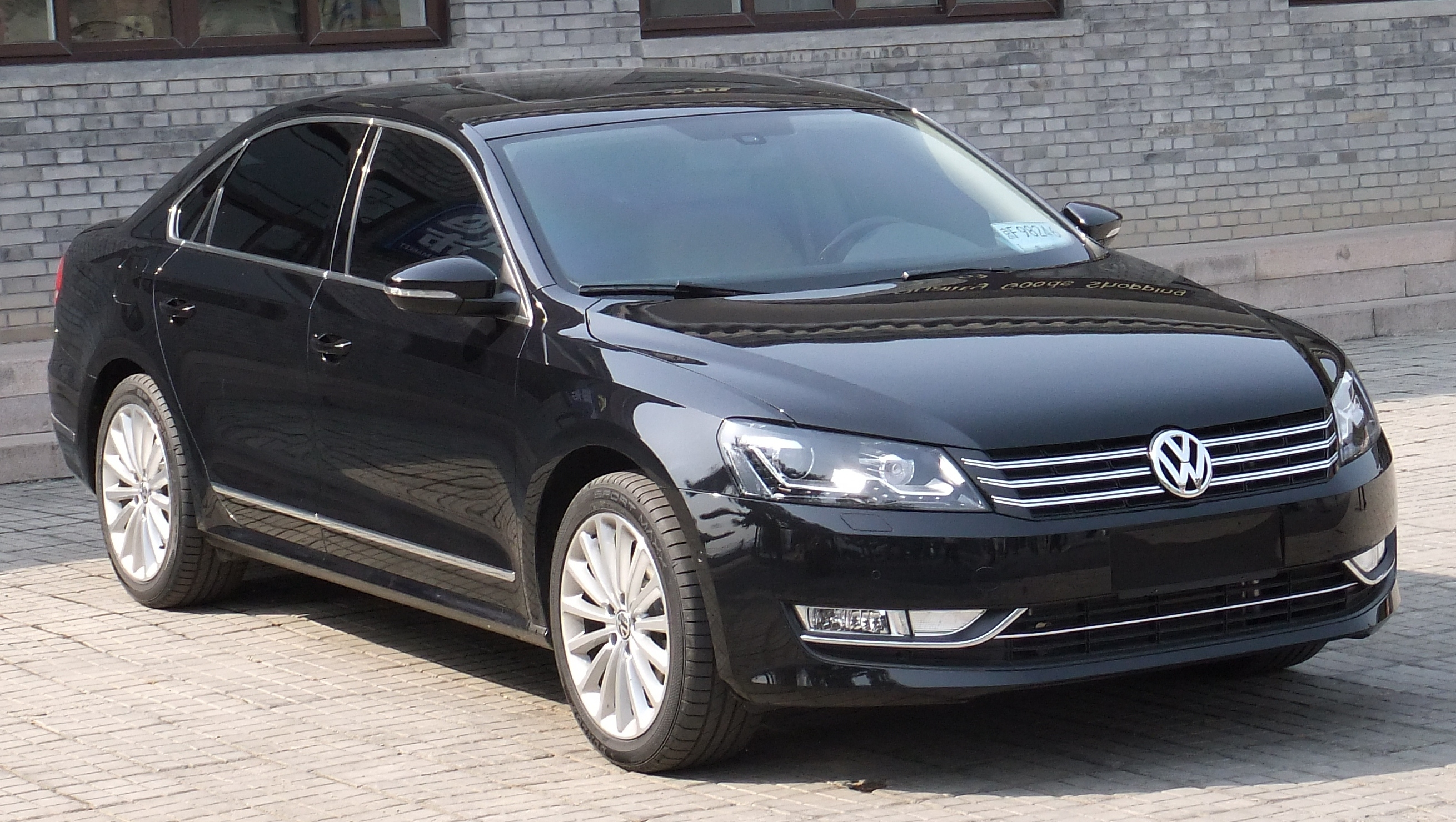
Volkswagen Passat NMS (China)

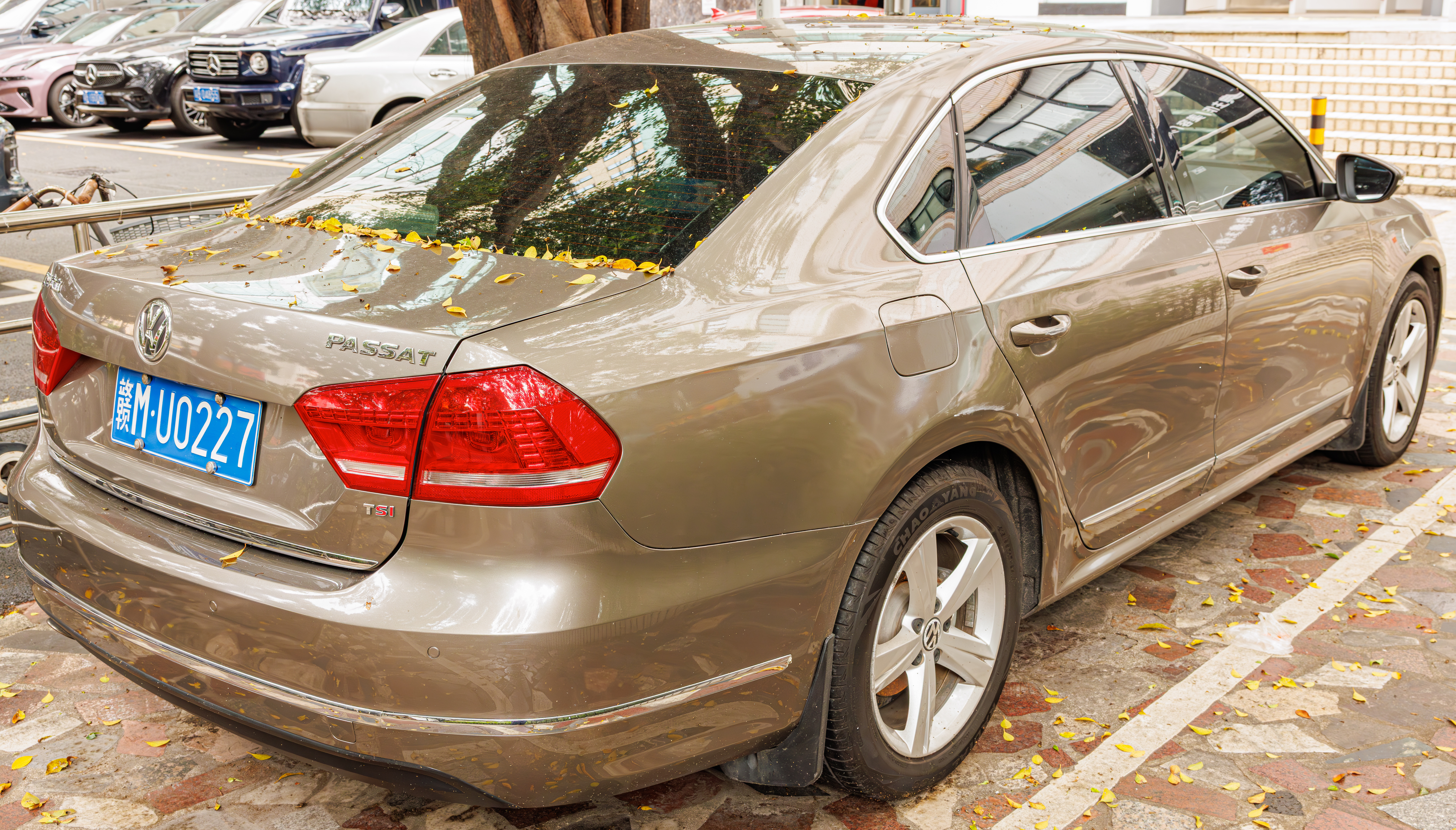
Volkswagen Passat NMS (China) Rear view

=== Facelift ===
Volkswagen refreshed the North American Passat in 2015 for the 2016 model year with styling and technology updates, including revised hood, front fenders, front and rear bumpers, and trunklid.

The Passat now offers optional LED headlights and taillights, a black-accented front bumper, a rear diffuser-like piece and 19-inch wheels.

The updated dashboard features the company's MIB II system (modular infotainment platform) with two sizes of touch screens available, depending on option package. These screens also will feature proximity sensors to pop up the relevant controls as the hand gets closer to the screen. The system is set to offer Volkswagen's Car-Net connectivity system, with Apple CarPlay, Android Auto, and MirrorLink compatibility, which allows connection to a smartphone.

The revised Passat featured as standard equipment a rearview camera as well as automatic post-collision braking, which prevents the car from pinballing from an accident and crashing into other objects after an initial impact. Adaptive cruise control, forward-collision warning with autonomous emergency braking, a blind-spot monitor with rear traffic alert, lane-departure warning, and parking steering assist are all available depending on trim level.

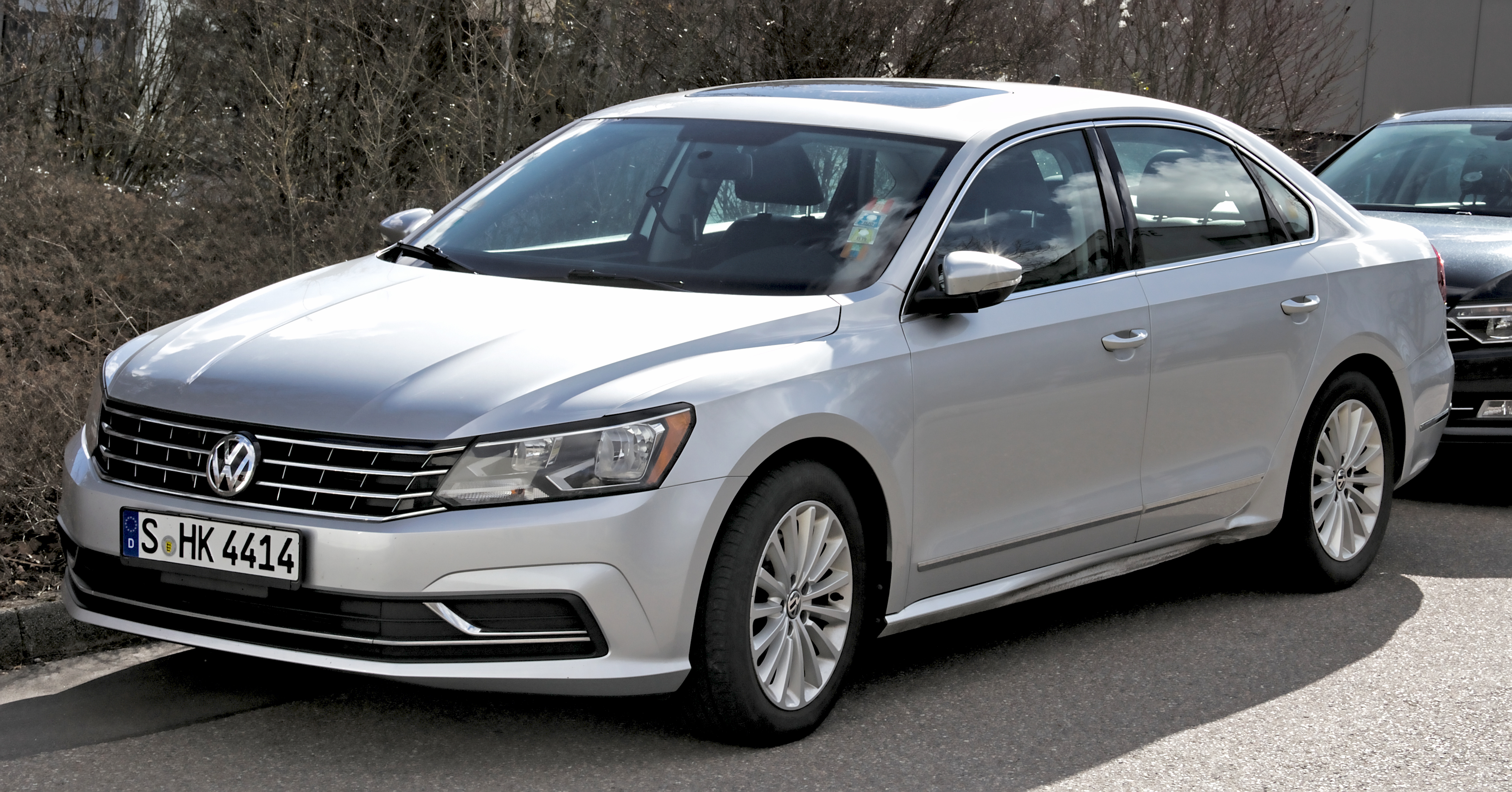
Facelift (North America)

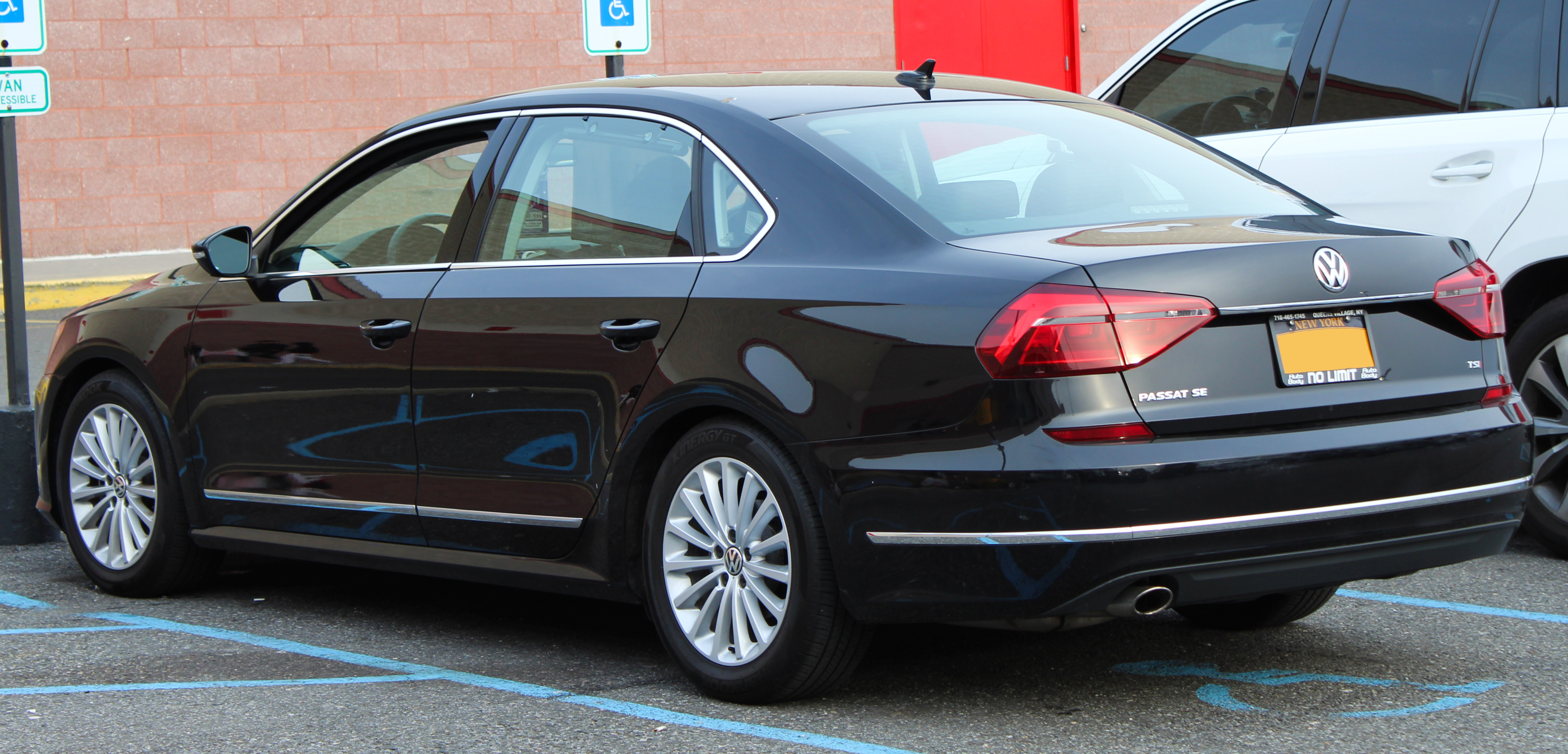
Facelift (North America)

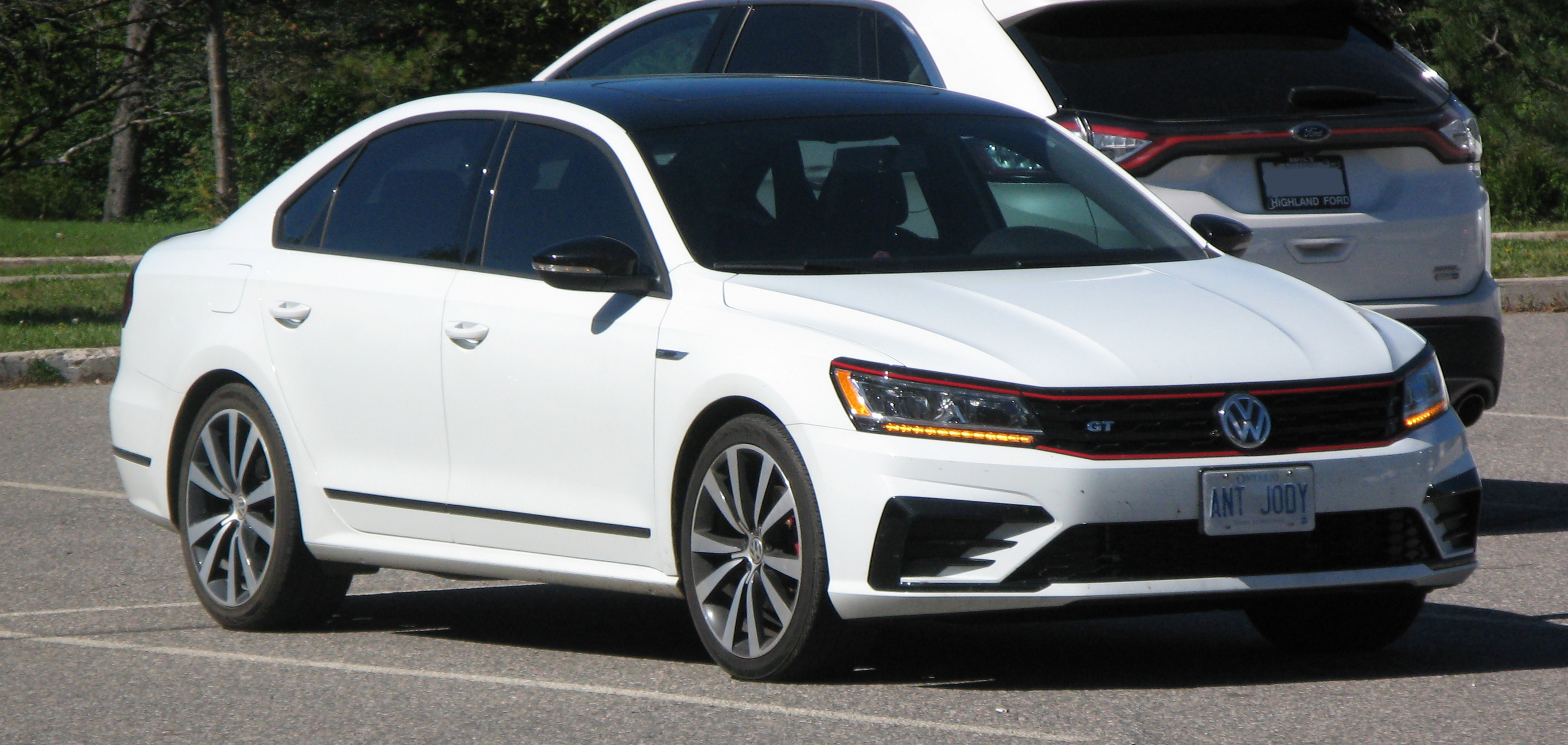
2018 Passat GT (facelift)

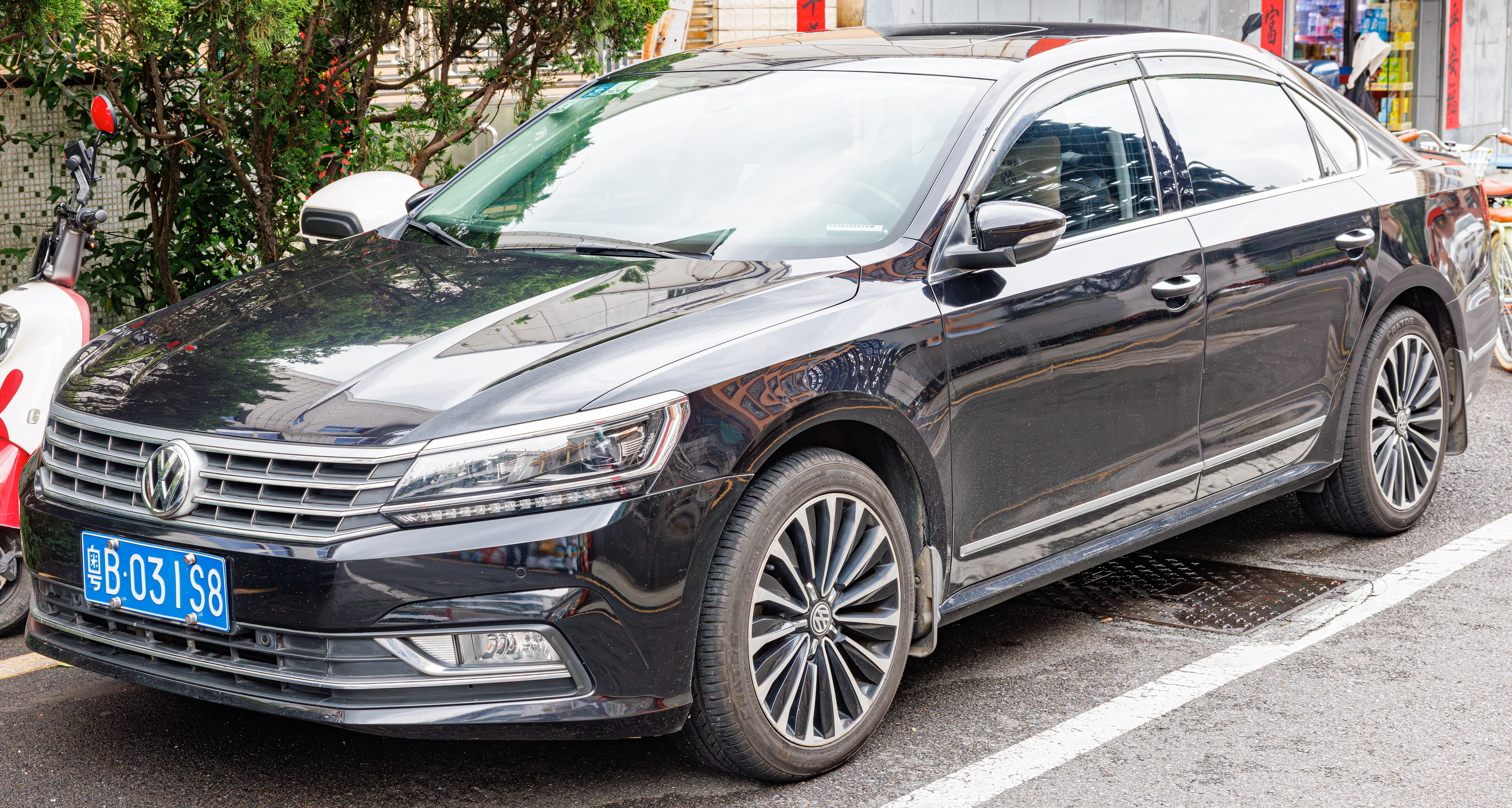
Facelift (China)

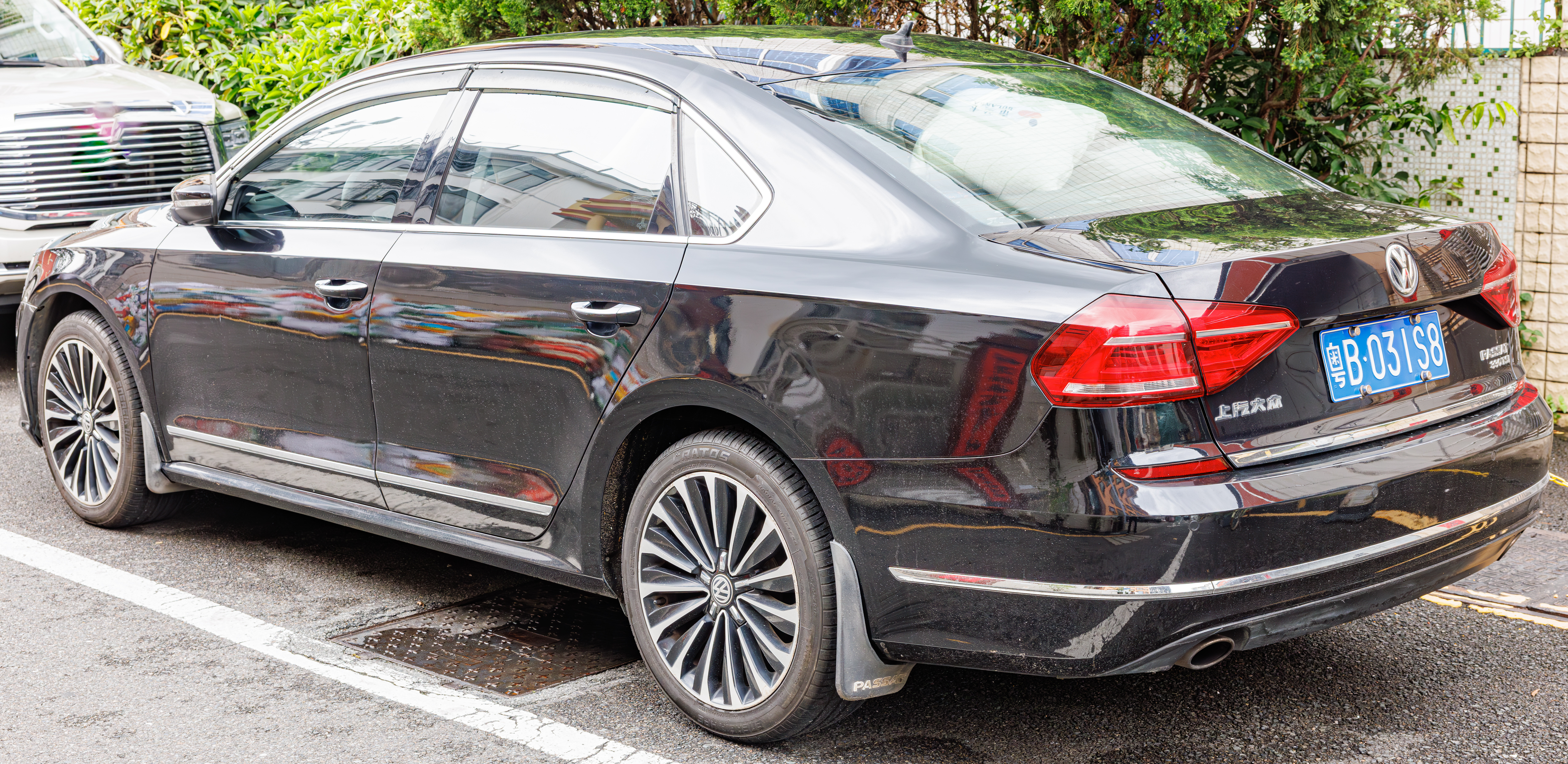
Facelift (China)

=== Engines ===
==== North America ====
In Canada and the United States, the Passat NMS was initially released with a 2.5-liter 5-cylinder engine, 2.0-liter TDI engine and 3.6-liter VR6 engine. For the 2014 model year, a new 1.8-liter TSI 4-cylinder engine replaced the 2.5-liter inline-5 in North America. For the 2015 model year, a new 2.0-liter EA288 TDI with increased power replaced the previous EA189 2.0-liter TDI in North America. Due to the Volkswagen emissions scandal, TDI models were permanently discontinued after the 2015 model year.

The 2016 Passat was planned to offer the same three engine choices featured in the outgoing car: the base-model 1.8-liter TSI turbocharged four-cylinder, the 3.6-liter VR6, and the 2.0-liter TDI diesel four-cylinder. The 1.8 T will do 38 mpg_{‑US} (6.2 L/100 km) highway with the automatic transmission. Following the company's emissions scandal, VW halted sales of 2.0-liter TDI-equipped vehicles. The 2.0-liter TSI was offered in place of the TDI.

For 2018, the previous 1.8-liter TSI 4-cylinder engine for base Passat models has been replaced by a 2.0-liter TSI 4-cylinder engine, sourced from the second-generation Volkswagen Tiguan. Models with the 3.6 VR6 engine were discontinued after the 2018 model year.

Gasoline engines
Model	Displacement	Series	Power	Torque	Transmission	Model years
1.8 TSI	1,798 cc (109.7 cu in) I4	EA888	170 hp (172 PS; 127 kW)	184 lb⋅ft (249 N⋅m)	5-speed manual or 6-speed automatic	2014–2015 (manual); 2014–2017 (automatic)
2.0 TSI	1,984 cc (121.1 cu in) I4	EA888	174 hp (176 PS; 130 kW)	184 lb⋅ft (249 N⋅m)	6-speed automatic	2018–2019
2.5 MPI	2,480 cc (151.3 cu in) I5	EA855	170 hp (172 PS; 127 kW)	177 lb⋅ft (240 N⋅m)	5-speed manual or 6-speed automatic	2012–2013
3.6 VR6 FSI	3,597 cc (219.5 cu in) VR6	EA390	280 hp (284 PS; 209 kW)	258 lb⋅ft (350 N⋅m)	6-speed DSG	2012–2018
Diesel engines
2.0 TDI	1,968 cc (120 cu in) I4	EA189	140 hp (142 PS; 104 kW)	236 lb⋅ft (320 N⋅m)	6-speed manual or 6-speed DSG	2012–2014
2.0 TDI	1,968 cc (120 cu in) I4	EA288	150 hp (152 PS; 112 kW)	236 lb⋅ft (320 N⋅m)	6-speed manual or 6-speed DSG	2015–2016

==== China ====
In China, the NMS is offered with a base 1.4-liter TSI available with a 5-speed manual or 7-speed DSG. The 1.8-liter variant was available with the 6-speed automatic or 7-speed DSG gearbox. The 2.0-liter TSI was available with the 6-speed DSG or 7-speed DSG gearbox and 3.0-liter VR6 came standard with 6-speed DSG gearbox.

Gasoline engines
Model	Displacement	Power	Torque	Transmission
1.4 '280 TSI'	1,390 cc (84.8 cu in) I4	128 hp (130 PS; 95 kW)	220 N⋅m (162 lb⋅ft)	5-speed manual or 7-speed DSG
1.8 '330 TSI'	1,798 cc (109.7 cu in) I4	158 hp (160 PS; 118 kW)	250 N⋅m (184 lb⋅ft)	6-speed automatic or 7-speed DSG
2.0 '380 TSI'	1,984 cc (121.1 cu in) I4	197 hp (200 PS; 147 kW)	280 N⋅m (207 lb⋅ft)	6-speed DSG or 7-speed DSG
3.0 VR6 FSI	2,975 cc (182 cu in) VR6	247 hp (250 PS; 184 kW)	310 N⋅m (229 lb⋅ft)	6-speed DSG

=== Reception ===
The Passat NMS won the 2012 Motor Trend Car of the Year. The 2013 Passat TDI sets new Guinness World Record for fuel economy under the non-hybrid car category. It achieved a fuel consumption of only 3.02 liters on 100 kilometers (77.99 mpg).

In a March 2012 comparison test by Car and Driver, the Volkswagen Passat NMS came in first place out of six cars. In a November 2012 comparison by the same magazine with three since-redesigned competitors, the Passat placed last.

In another 2012 comparison test by Motor Trend, the Volkswagen Passat NMS came in first place out of six cars.

=== Recall ===
On November 23, 2020, Passats from 2016 to 2019 model years were recalled since the front seat back adjustment levers may not be engaged correctly, increasing risks of injuries.

== Second generation ==
=== North America (2019) ===
Second generation (North America)
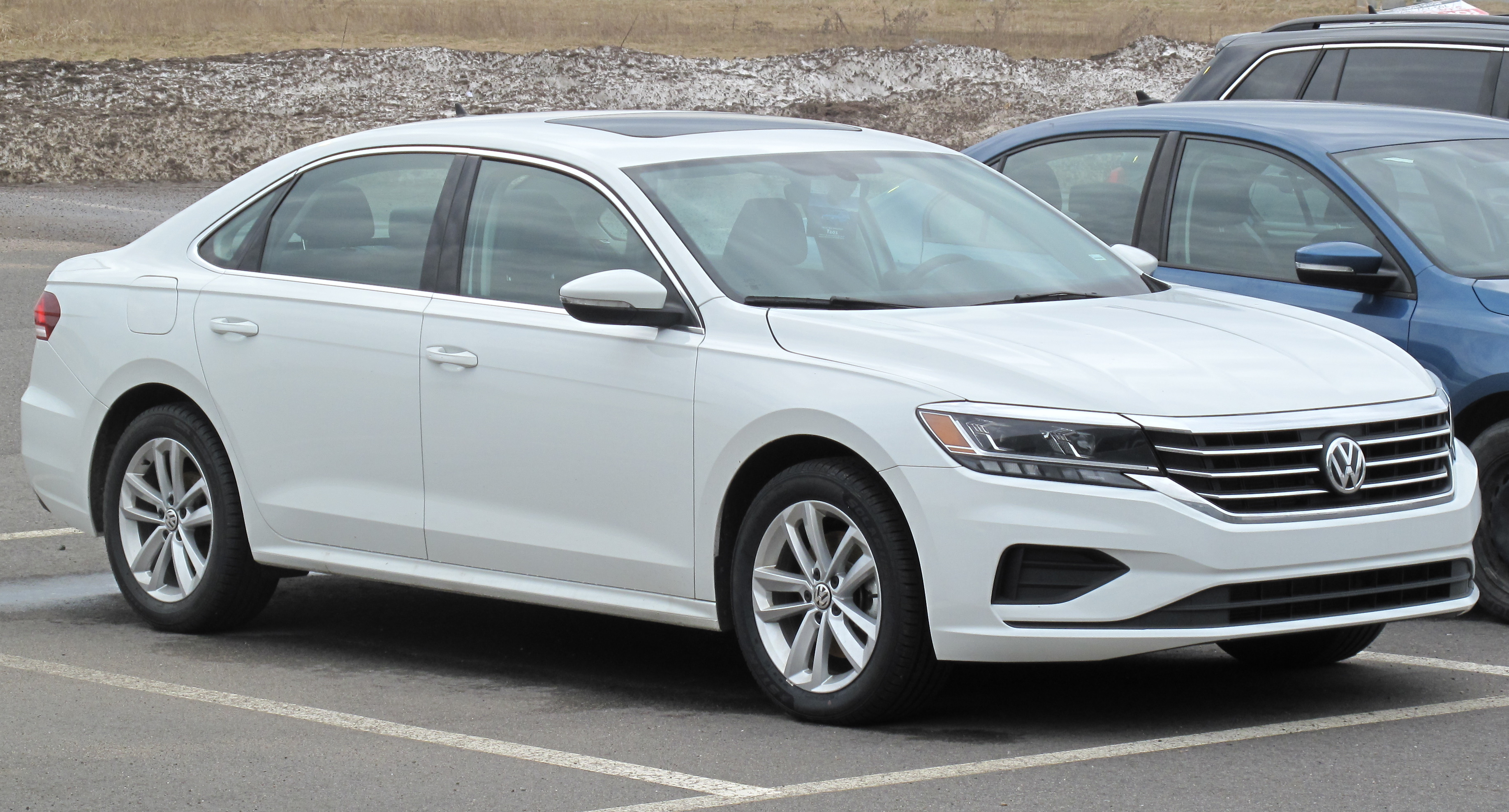

Overview
- Production: 2019–2022
- Model years: 2020–2022
- Assembly: United States: Chattanooga, Tennessee (Volkswagen Chattanooga Assembly Plant)

Body and chassis
- Platform: Volkswagen Group PQ46

Powertrain
- Engine: Gasoline: 2.0 L TSI I4; 2.5 L MPI I5 (Middle East)
- Transmission: 6-speed automatic

Dimensions
- Wheelbase: 2,803 mm (110.4 in)
- Length: 4,875 mm (191.9 in)
- Width: 1,834 mm (72.2 in)
- Height: 1,487 mm (58.5 in)

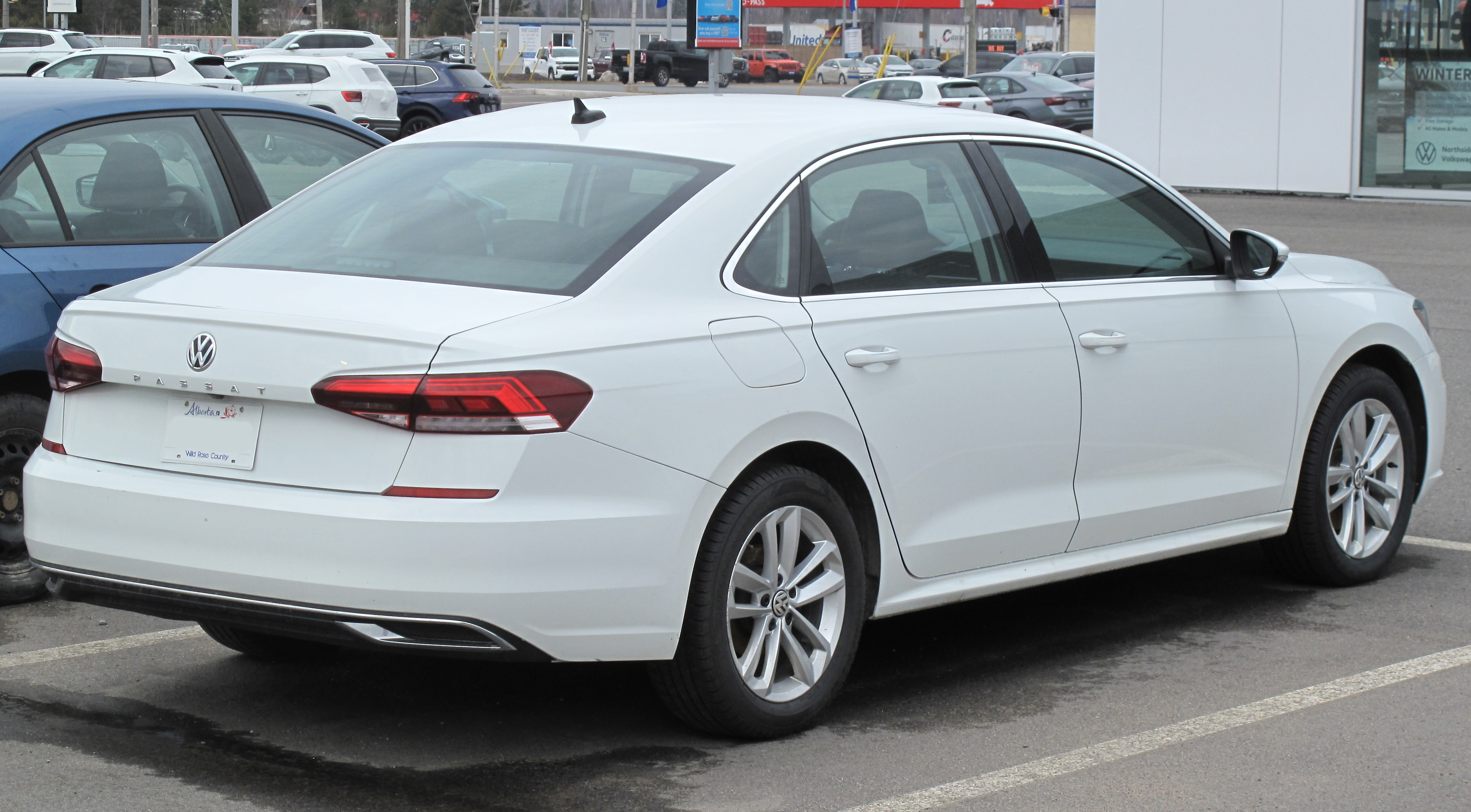
Rear view

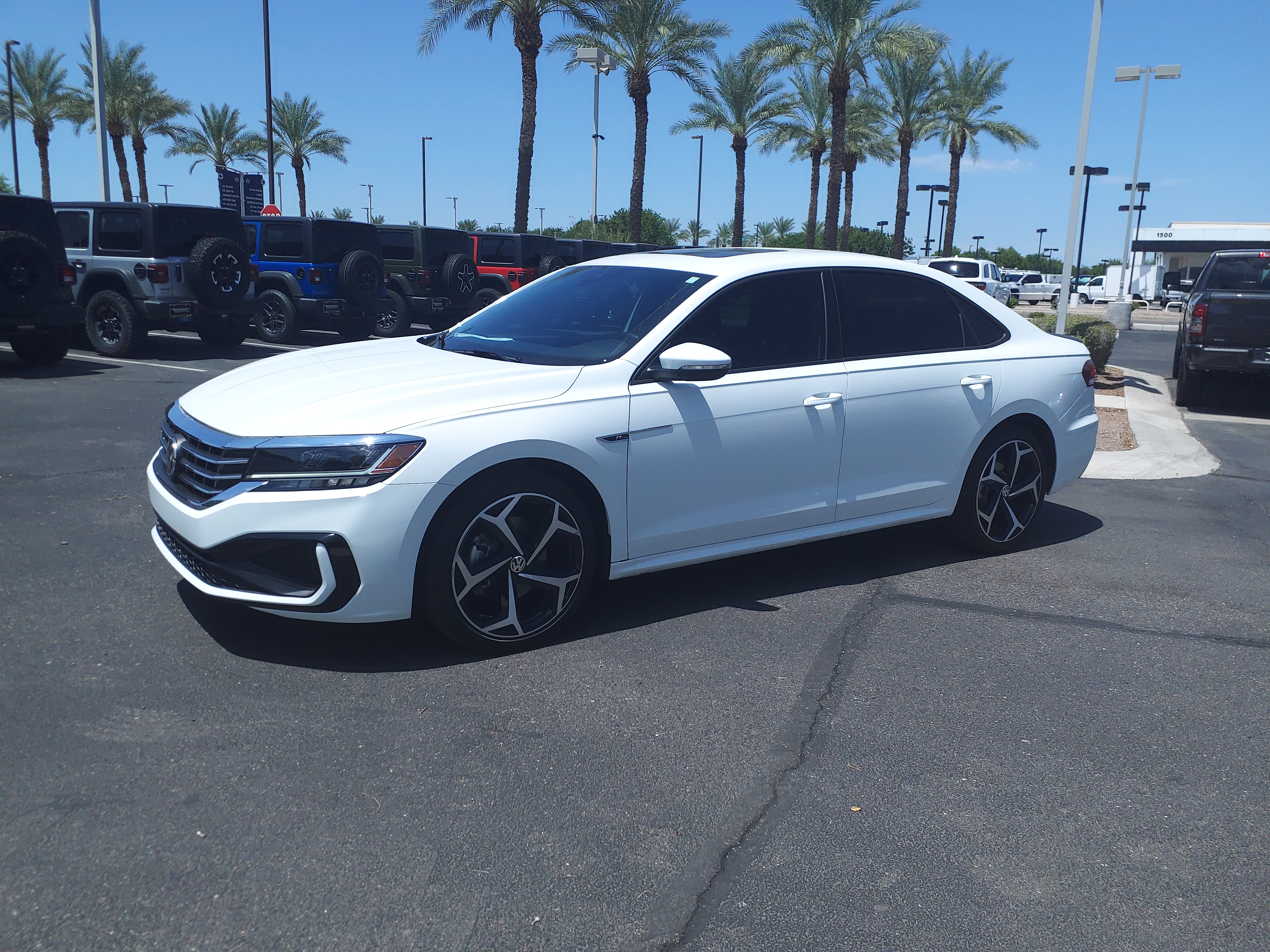

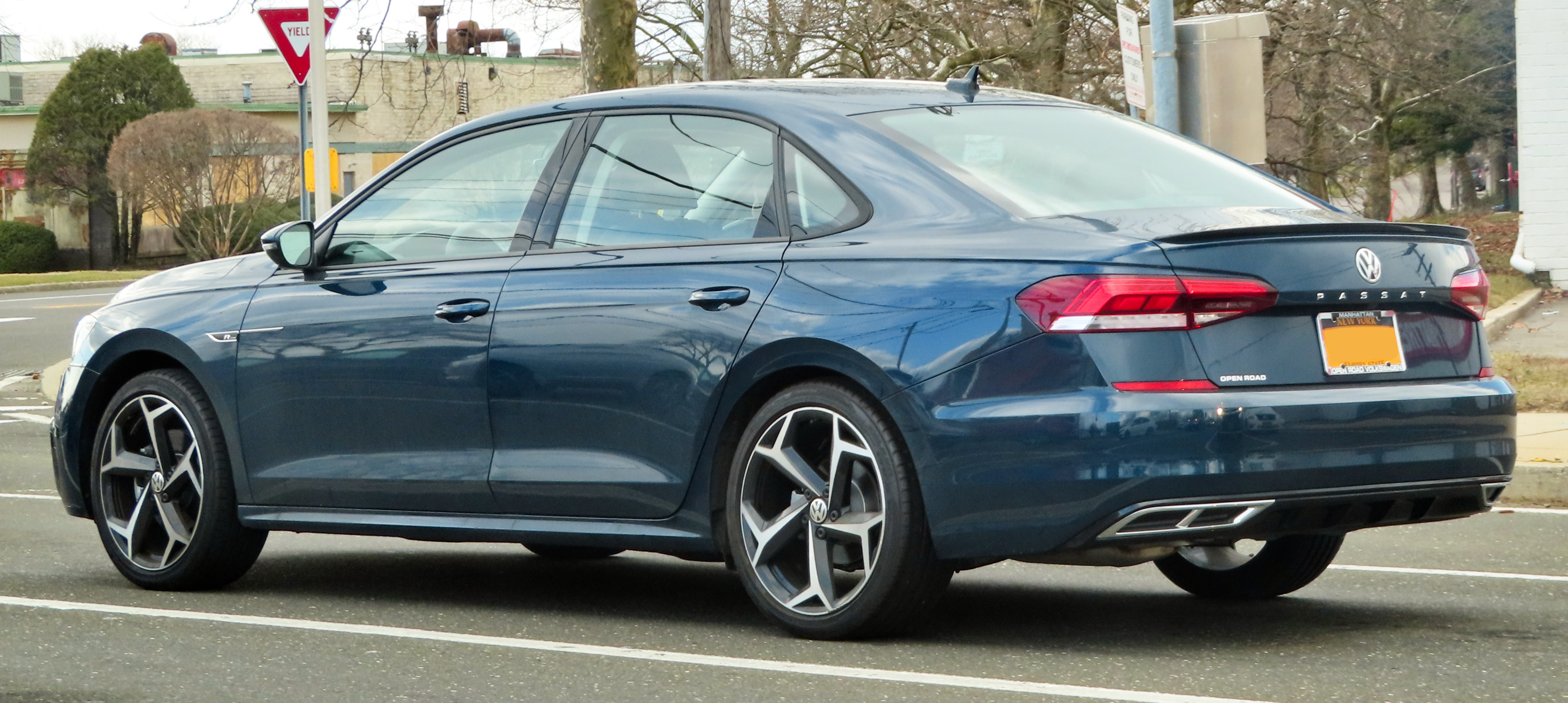
R-Line

The 2020 MY Passat is essentially a reskinned version of the earlier model, foregoing the Volkswagen Group MQB platform used on most other Volkswagen models. Features include revised exterior styling and wheel combinations, a suite of standard driver assistance technologies, and a 6.33-inch touchscreen infotainment system with next-generation VW CarNet 4G LTE in-vehicle telematics. It is exclusive to North America, as China gets its own version of Passat.

The revised Passat NMS does not offer a fully digital LCD instrument cluster or an 8-speed automatic transmission that are offered on other VW models. The Passat had previously been discontinued in Mexico after the 2018 model year and this revised Passat is not sold in that market, with the Jetta taking its place.

The second generation is still powered by a 174 hp (176 PS; 130 kW), 2.0-liter TSI I4 gasoline engine and six-speed automatic transmission from the first generation, the new Passat is available in four trim levels: base S, midlevel SE, sporty R-Line, and range-topping SEL. Only the SEL offers full leather-trimmed seating surfaces, a Fender premium audio system and Park Distance Control (PDC). The R-Line sports a unique front fascia, as well as larger alloy wheels and tires. The 2020 Passat went on sale at Volkswagen dealerships nationwide in the fall of 2019.

In the Canadian market, the Passat is offered in three trim levels: Comfortline, Highline and Execline (available with the optional R-Line package).

Apart from the North American market, this version of the Passat is also available in the Middle East with the 2.5-litre engine until its discontinuation in 2022.

==== Discontinuation and Limited Edition ====
After initially planning to discontinue the Passat in 2023, Volkswagen ended Passat production in the United States after the 2022 model year. The final build rolled off the Chattanooga production line in December 2021. To commemorate the end of the Passat nameplate (which VW had offered since 1973) and production in the United States, Volkswagen offered a Limited Edition with 1,973 produced in four different color combinations. The production figures for the Limited Edition Passat signify the following:

- 423 (Racing Green Metallic): The telephone area code (423) for the Chattanooga, Tennessee area, where the NMS Volkswagen Passat was produced.
- 411 (Kings Red Metallic): The chassis code (411) for the original first-generation Passat.
- 524 (Pure White Clear Coat): The date (May 24, 2011) that the assembly plant in Chattanooga began production of the Passat.
- 615 (Platinum Gray Metallic): The number of generations of Passat produced (6), the number of generations of Passat produced at the Chattanooga assembly plant (1), and the number of decades that the Volkswagen Passat has been sold in the United States (5). Coincidentally, 615 had been the area code for Chattanooga from 1954 until the creation of 423 in 1995.

=== China (2019) ===
Second generation (China)
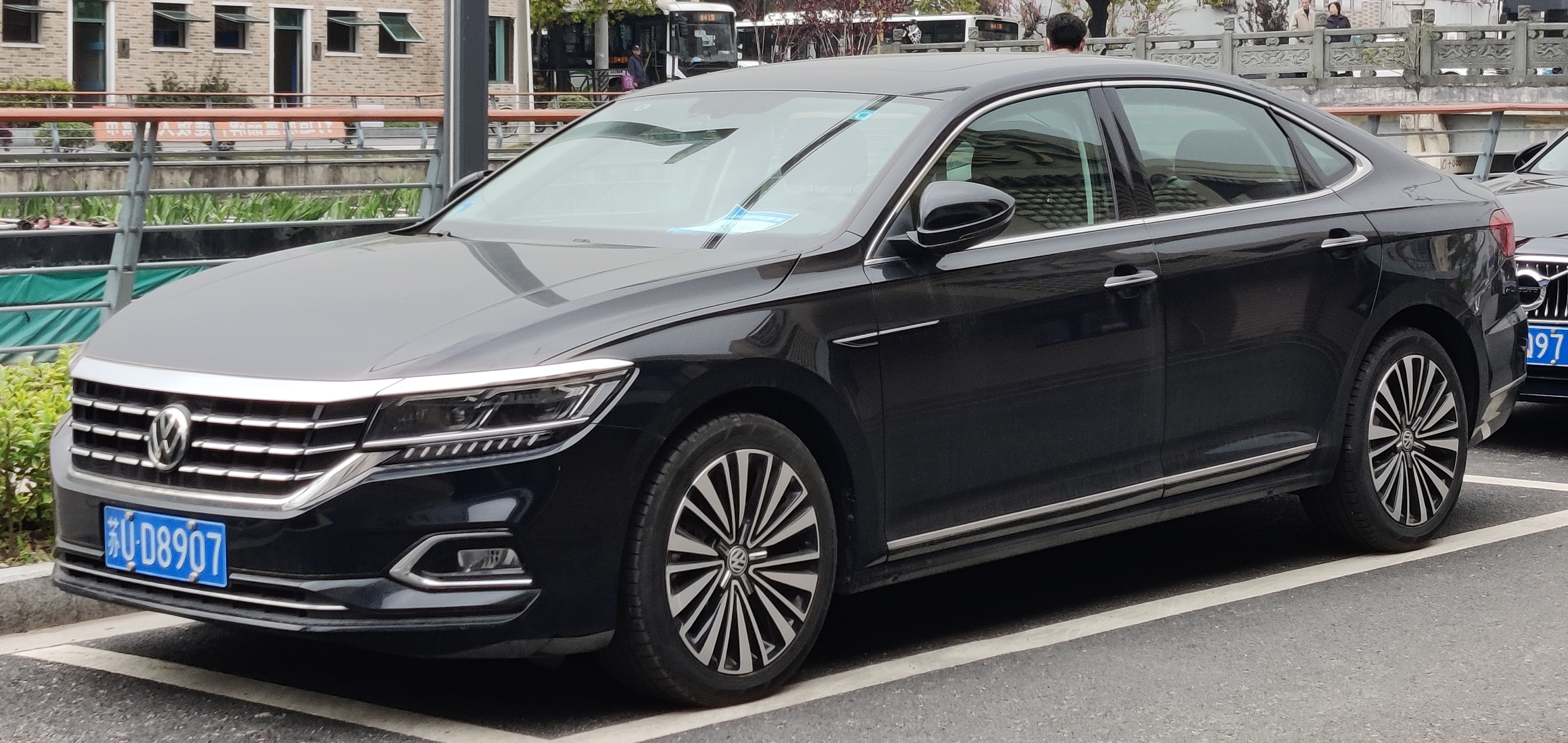

Overview
- Production: 2019–present
- Assembly: China: Nanjing (SAIC-VW)

Body and chassis
- Platform: Volkswagen Group MQB
- Related: Volkswagen Passat/Magotan (B8)

Powertrain
- Engine: Gasoline: 1.4 L EA211 I4 TSI; 2.0 L EA888 I4 TSI; Gasoline plug-in hybrid: 1.4 L EA211 TSI I4 (Passat PHEV GTE)
- Electric motor: 3-phase permanent magnet synchronous electric motor (Passat PHEV GTE)
- Transmission: 7-speed DSG
- Hybrid drivetrain: PHEV (Passat PHEV GTE)

Dimensions
- Wheelbase: 2,871 mm (113.0 in)
- Length: 4,908 mm (193.2 in)
- Width: 1,836 mm (72.3 in)
- Height: 1,469 mm (57.8 in)

Chronology
- Successor: Volkswagen Passat Pro

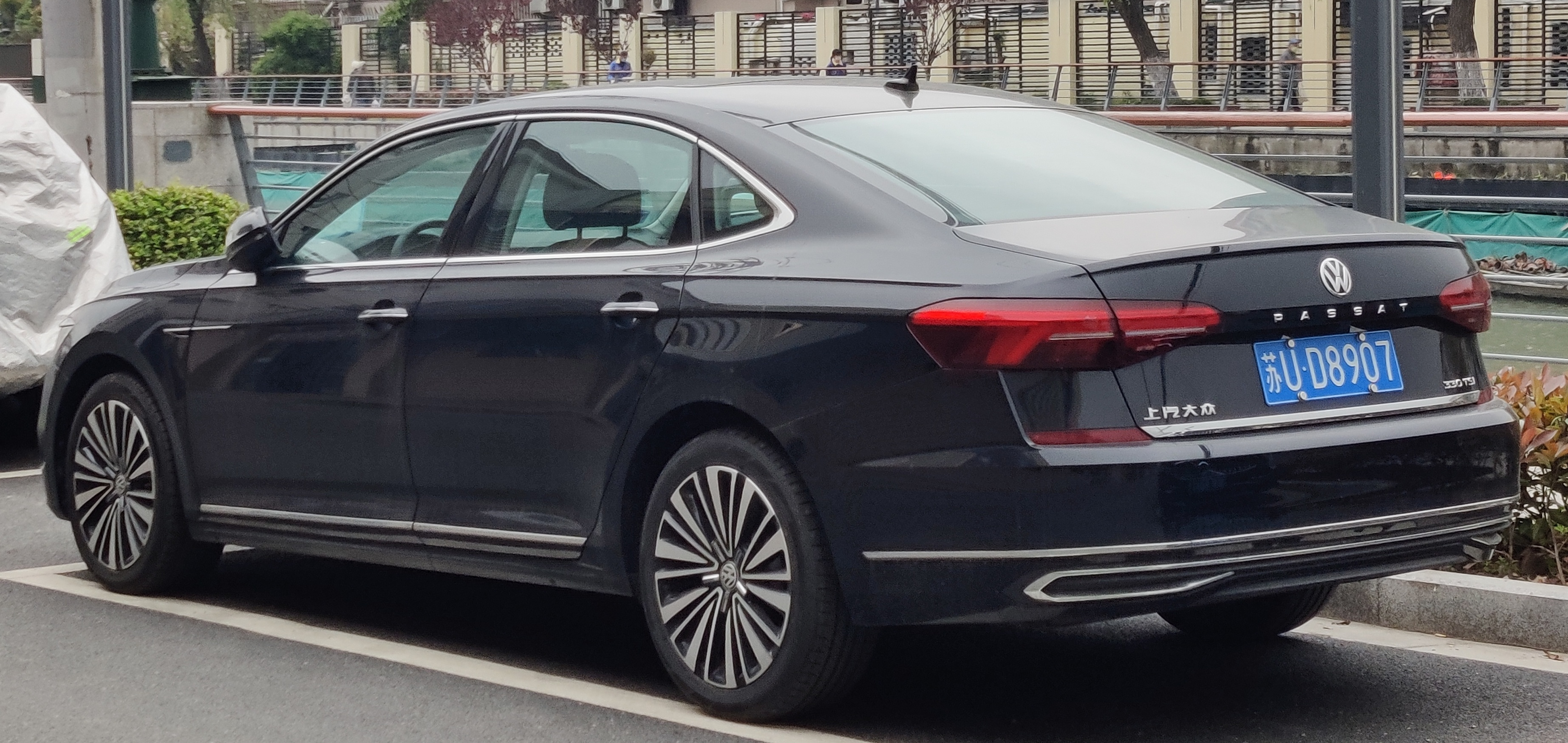
Rear view

Revealed on October 12, 2018 by SAIC Volkswagen, the Chinese market 2019 Passat replaces the Passat NMS in China. Despite the high resemblance between the Chinese and North American Passats, they are completely different models based on different platforms. The Chinese market 2019 Passat is built on the newer Volkswagen Group MQB platform together with third generation Magotan, which is a long-wheelbase version of the European B8 Passat. Trim levels are known as the 280 TSI, 330 TSI and 380 TSI. 280 TSI models receive the 1.4-liter EA211 engine, while 330 TSI and 380 TSI models receive the 2.0-liter EA888 engine. All models are available with 7-speed DSG gearbox as standard.

==== GTE ====
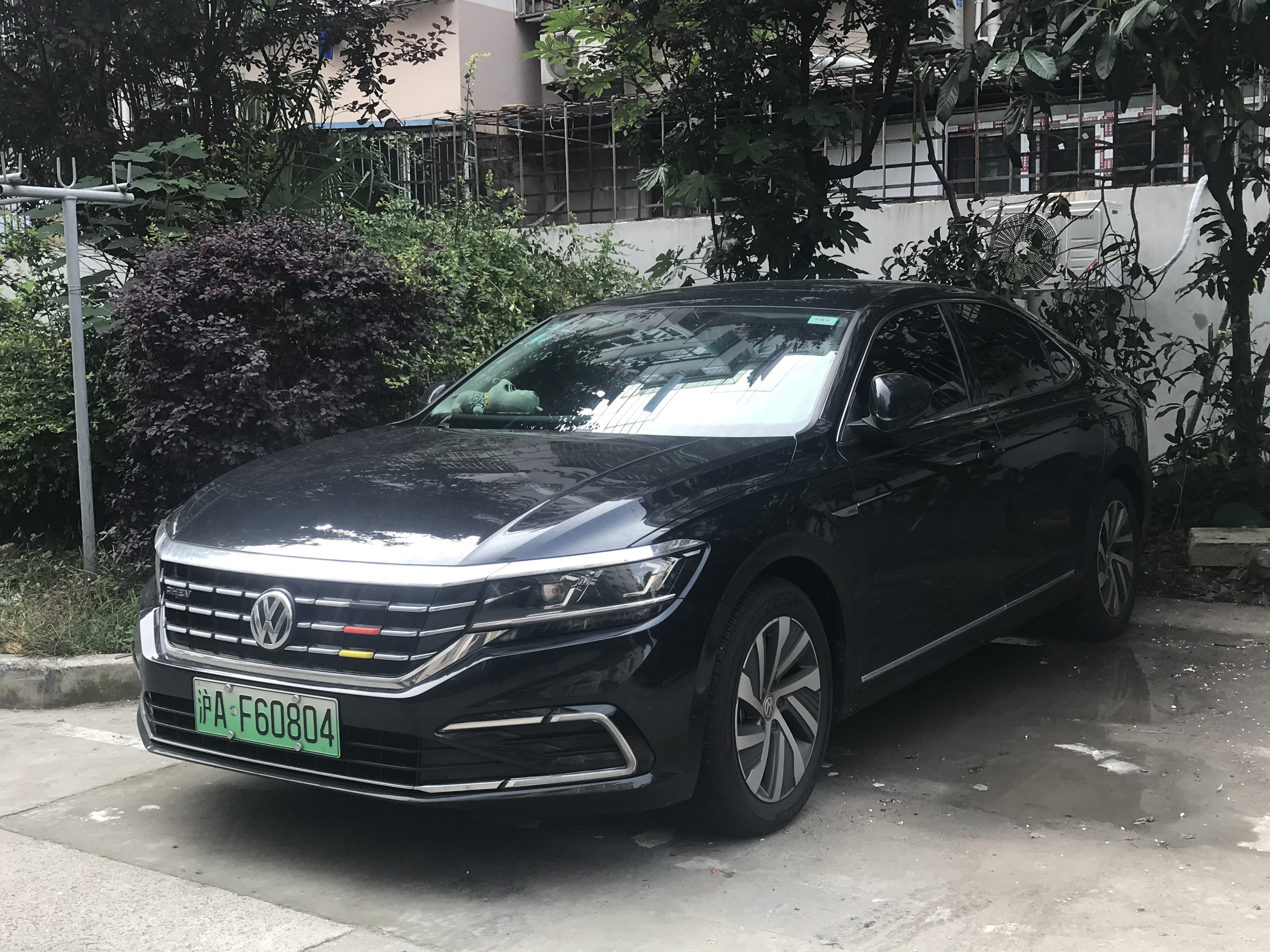
Volkswagen Passat PHEV

The Passat PHEV GTE in China was launched in October 2018 and boasts an overall combined range of up to 1,043 km (648 mi). In pure electric mode, it has a maximum range of up to 63 km (39 mi) and a top speed of 130 km/h (81 mph).

==== 2022 model year facelift ====
For the 2022 model year, the Passat received a refresh in the Chinese market. The updated model gets a restyled chrome front grille with honeycomb-shaped chrome inserts, along with updated LED headlights and a cleaner front bumper design. As for the rear, the updated design features a full-width light bar.

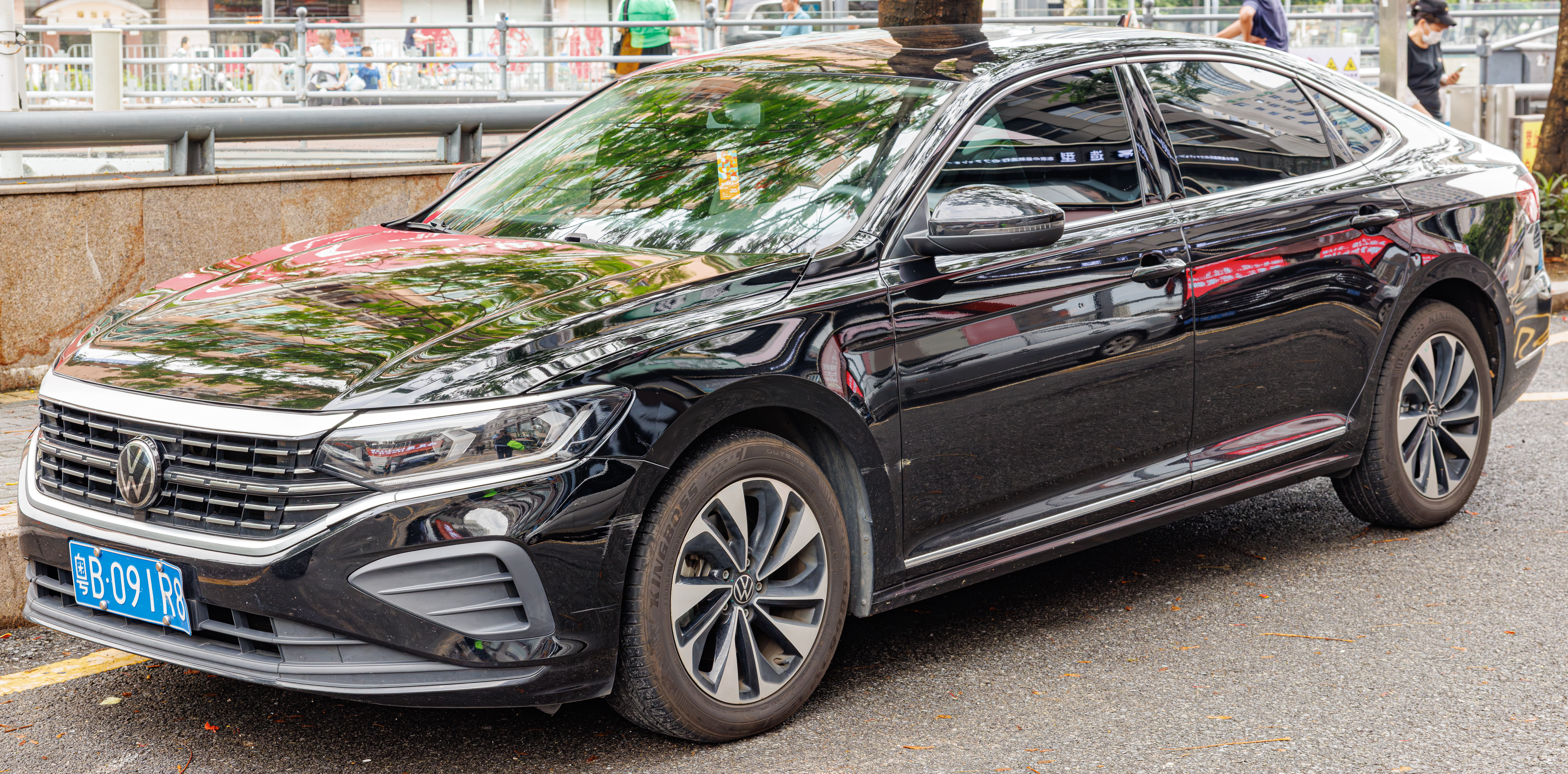
2022 facelift (Noble Edition)

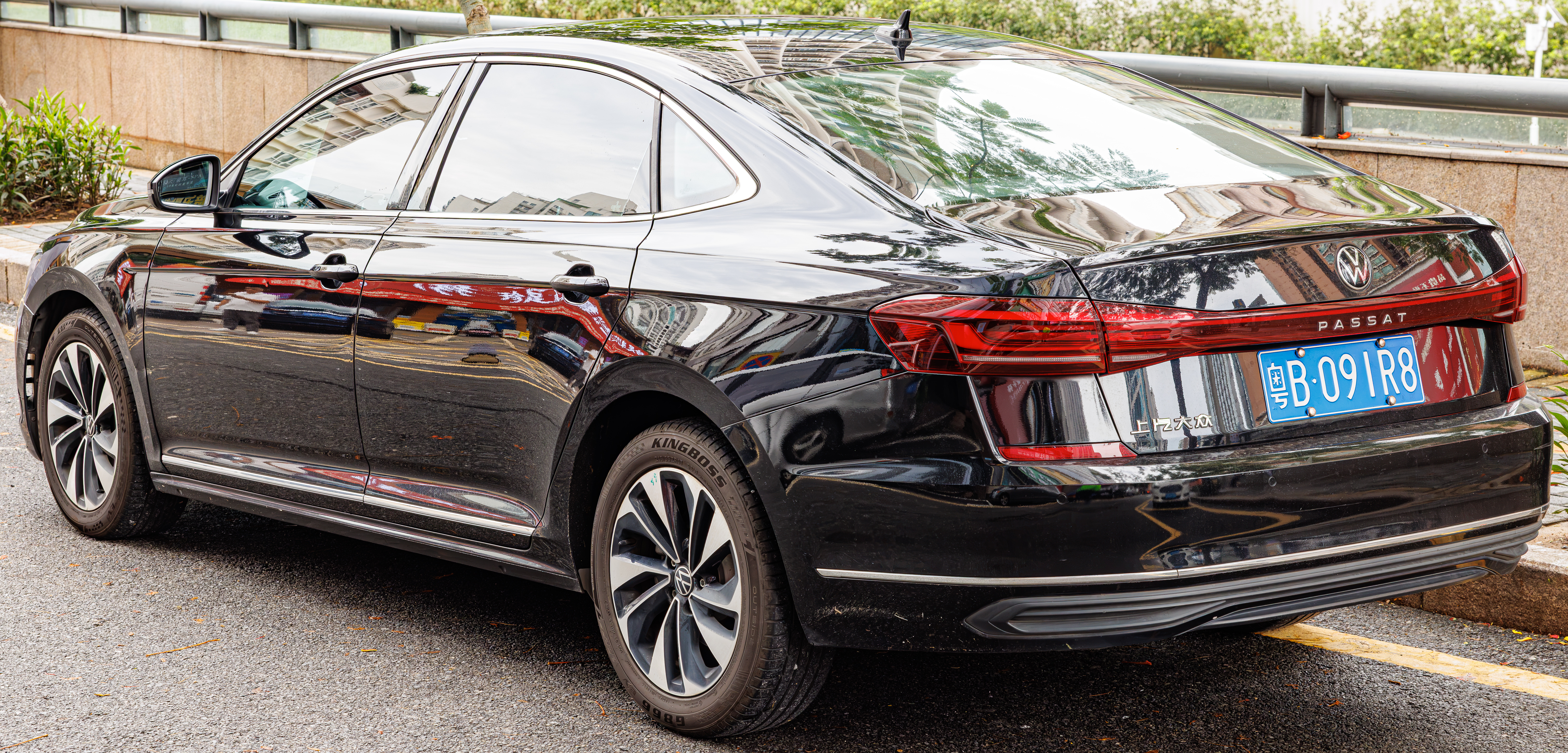
2022 facelift (Noble Edition)

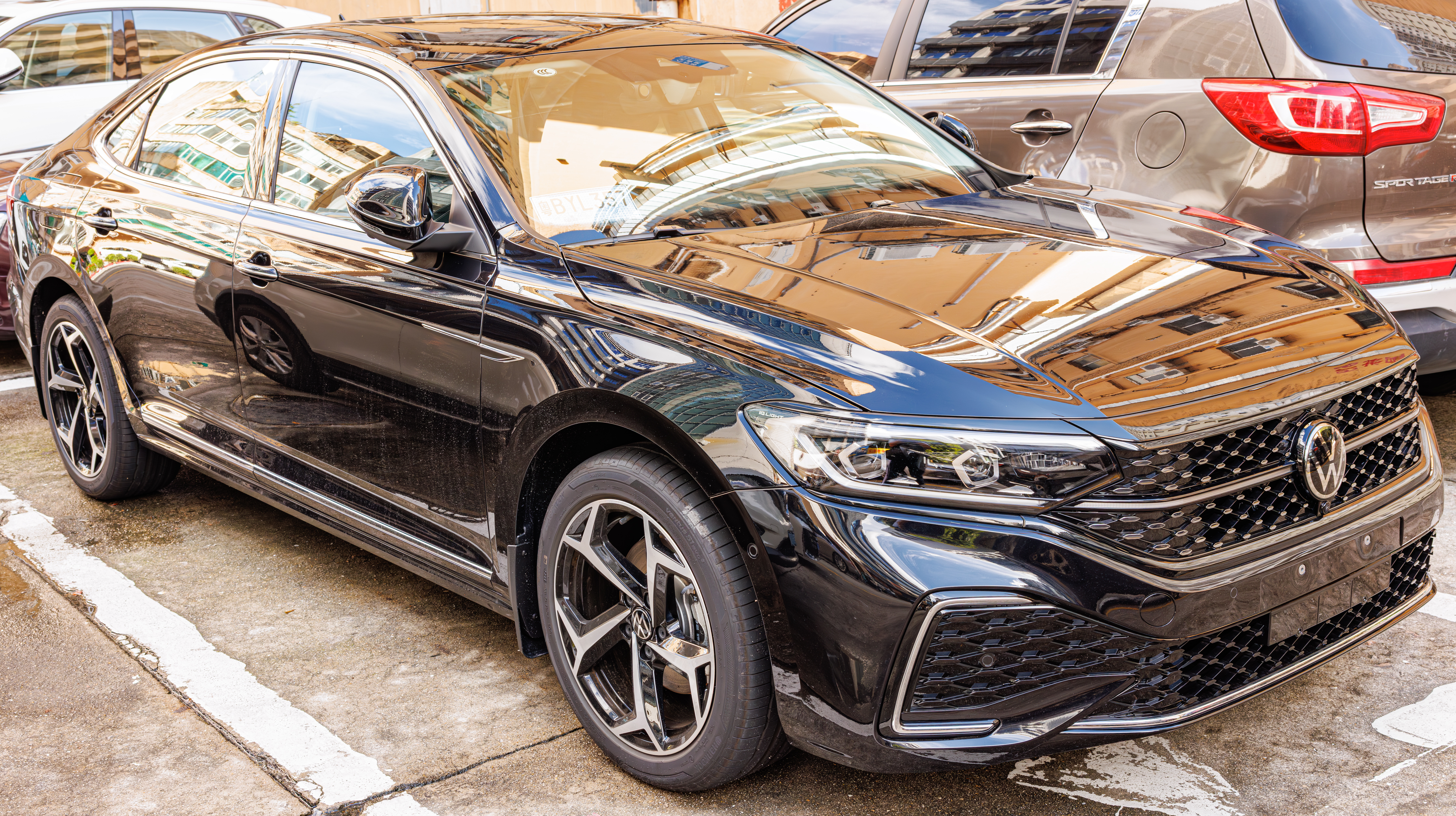
2022 facelift (Starry Sky Elite Edition)

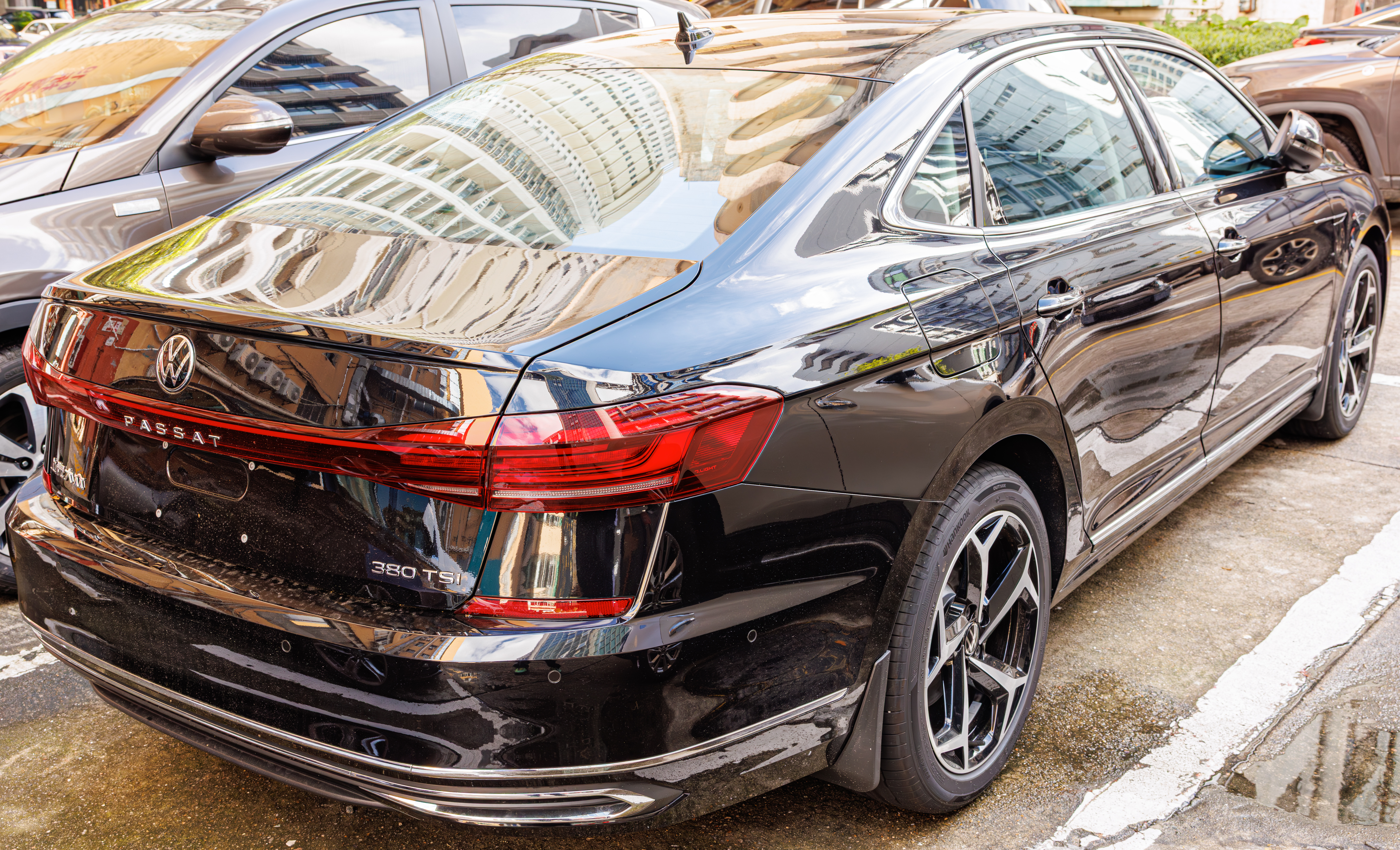
2022 facelift (Starry Sky Elite Edition)

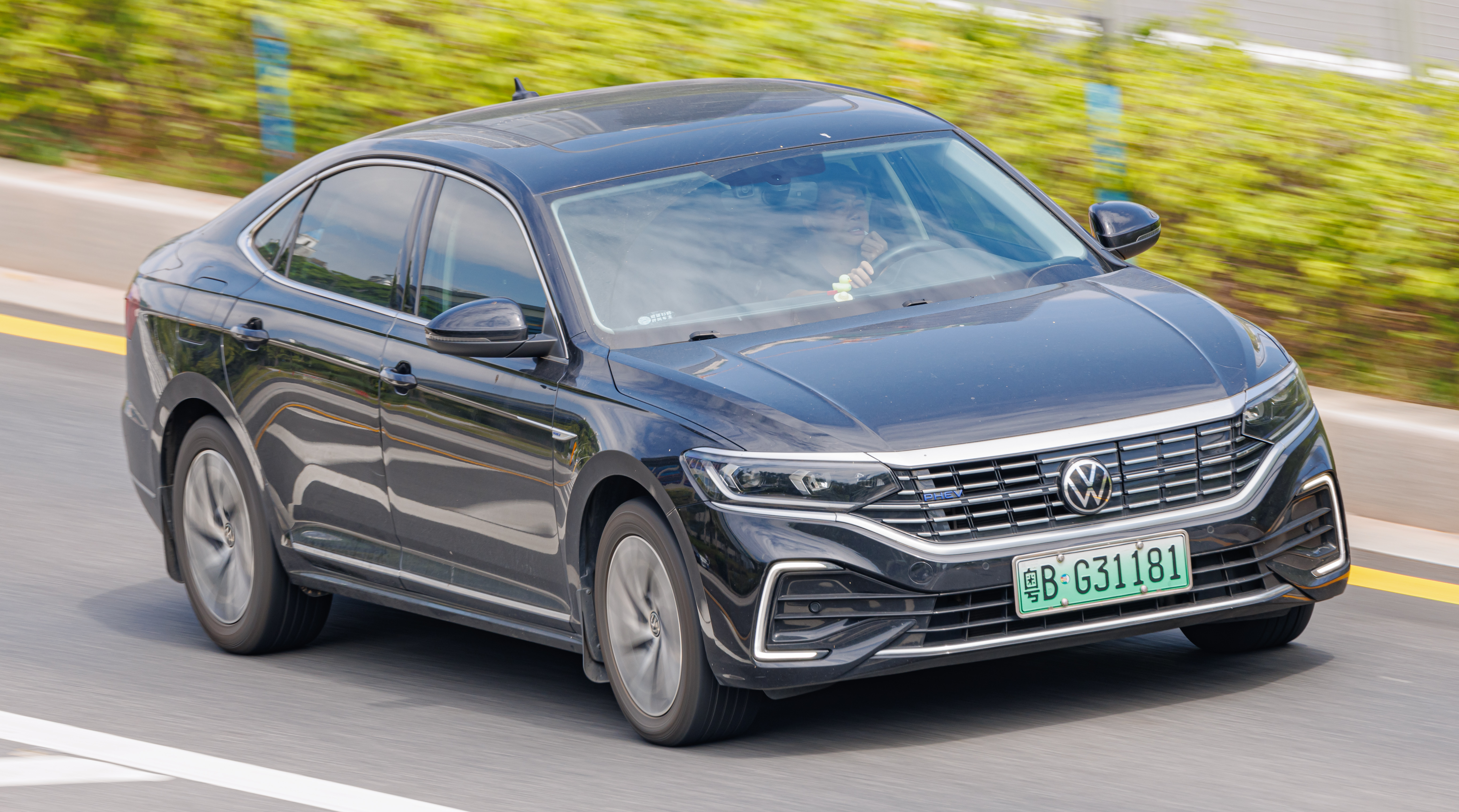
2022 facelift (PHEV)

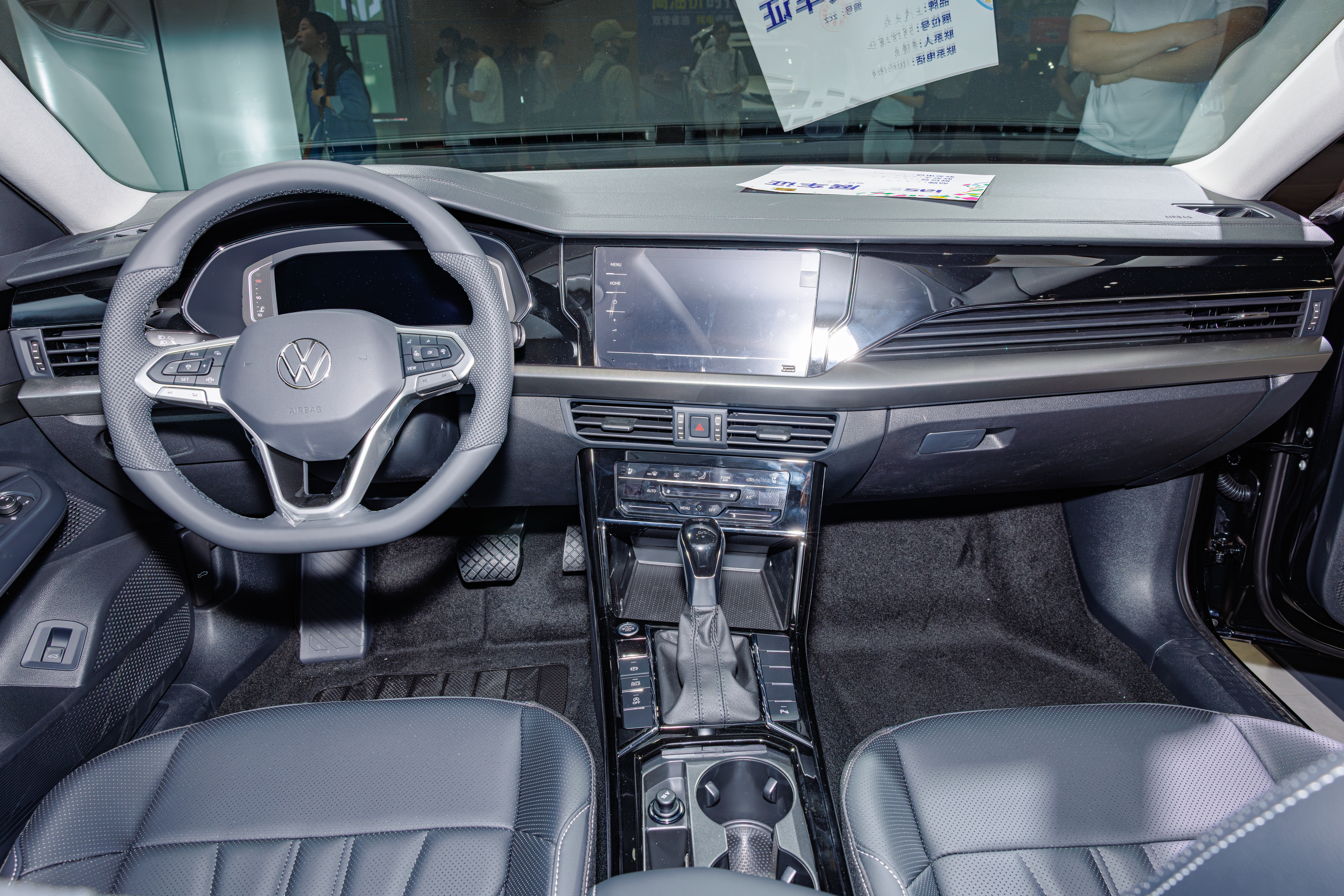
Interior (facelift)

== Sales ==
Calendar year	United States	China
2011	22,779	165,858
2012	117,023	233,321
2013	109,652	227,262
2014	96,649	218,344
2015	78,207	205,794
2016	73,002	188,214
2017	60,722	160,324
2018	41,401	179,028
2019	14,213	214,061
2020	22,964	145,805
2021	24,396	124,402
2022		
2023		185,880
2024		245,737
2025		226,195
