= Volkswagen Chattanooga Assembly Plant =

Automotive plant in Chattanooga, Tennessee, U.S.

Volkswagen Chattanooga
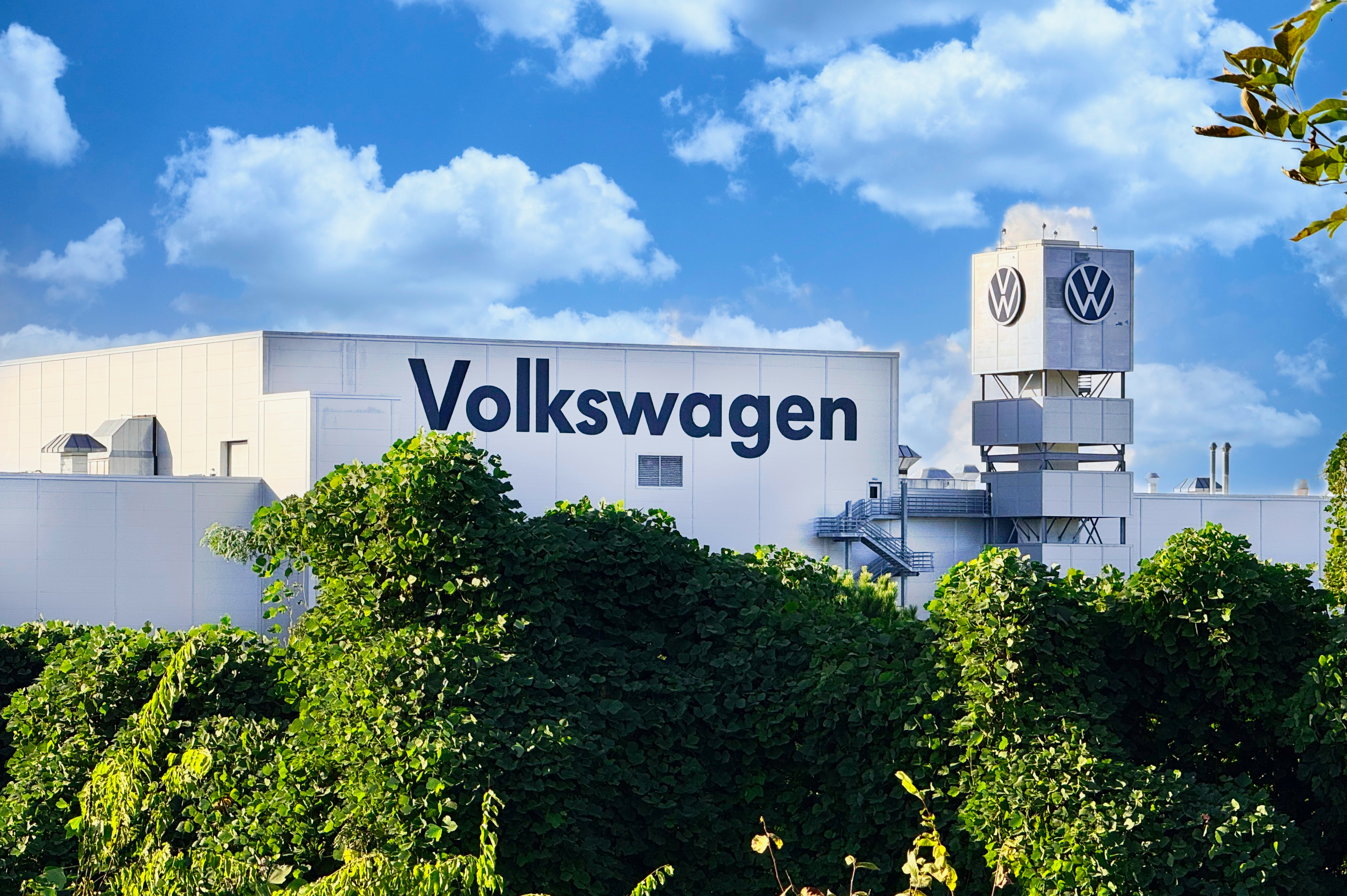
- Operated: 2011; 15 years ago
- Location: Chattanooga, Tennessee
- Coordinates: 35°04′48″N 85°08′06″W
- Industry: Automotive
- Products: Automobiles
- Employees: 4,500
- Owner: Volkswagen Group of America
- Website: vw.com/chattanooga

The Volkswagen Chattanooga Assembly Plant (or Chattanooga Operations LLC) is an American automobile assembly plant in Chattanooga, Tennessee. The plant was formally announced in July 2008 and inaugurated in May 2011.

Production began in April 2011 with the model year 2012 Passat NMS (New Midsize Sedan), tailored to the US market, with a projected annual production of 150,000 cars. Passat production ended in December 2021. Production of the Volkswagen Atlas commenced in 2017. Production of the electric Volkswagen ID.4 commenced on July 26, 2022.

== Background ==
Building a localized product, the local plant allows Volkswagen to avoid exchange rate fluctuations, monitor US automotive market trends, and potentially reduce vulnerability to extended supply chain issues. At its outset, Chattanooga Assembly manufactured 85% of the Passat's content, and about 85% of the content of the North American Passat comes from North American Free Trade Agreement (NAFTA) countries. The company initially had plans for an expansion that would increase capacity to 592,000 vehicles a year. Labor costs at the Tennessee plant, including wages and benefits, have been estimated to average $27 an hour, below those of Ford, GM, Chrysler, and some foreign automakers. As of late 2012, cars manufactured at the Chattanooga Assembly Plant have been exported to Mexico, Canada, South Korea, and the Middle East. The Chattanooga plant opened 23 years after the closing of the Westmoreland Assembly Plant near New Stanton, Pennsylvania, in 1988. The Westmoreland plant, which began operation in 1978, had been characterized by labor unrest and suffered from poor networking between Westmoreland and Volkswagen headquarters in then-West Germany.

== Site ==
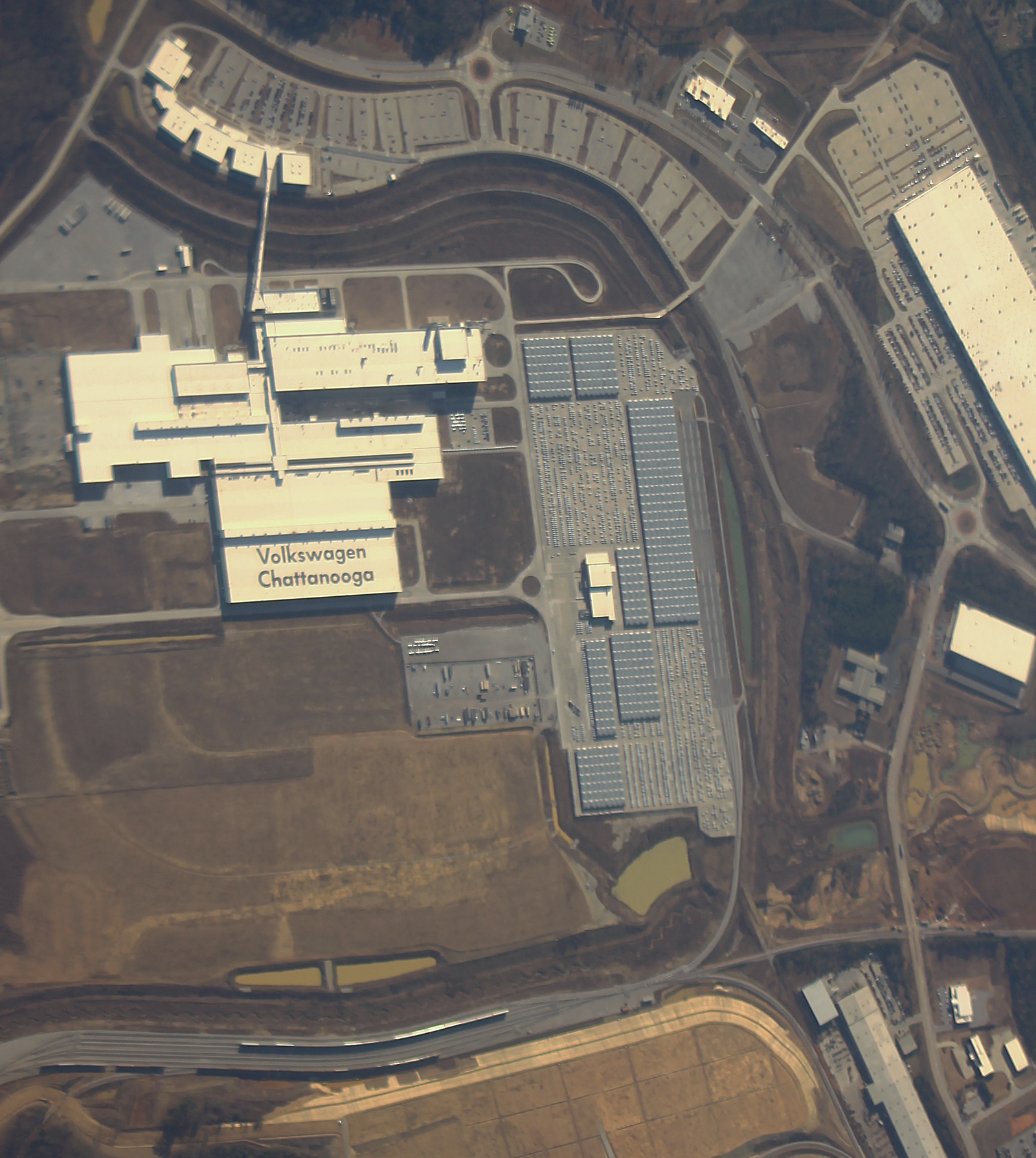
The plant pictured in 2012

The entire facility includes approximately 45 acres (180,000 m^{2}), and is constructed on a 1,400 acres (6 km^{2}) parcel of the 6,000-acre (24 km^{2}) Enterprise South Industrial Park in eastern Chattanooga.

The industrial park comprises land that was once an ammunition plant known as the Volunteer Army Ammunition Plant (VAAP), which manufactured up to 30,000,000 pounds (14,000 t) of TNT (trinitrotoluene) per month during World War II, the Korean War, and the Vietnam War. The Volkswagen facility is near a remaining storage area containing bunkers that were once used to store TNT. The site features nearby hiking, biking, walking trails, picnic areas, and overlooks, known as the Enterprise South Nature Park.

== Models ==
- Volkswagen Passat (NMS) (2011–2022)
- Volkswagen Atlas (2017–present)
- Volkswagen Atlas Cross Sport (2020–present)
- Volkswagen ID.4 (July 2022–2026)
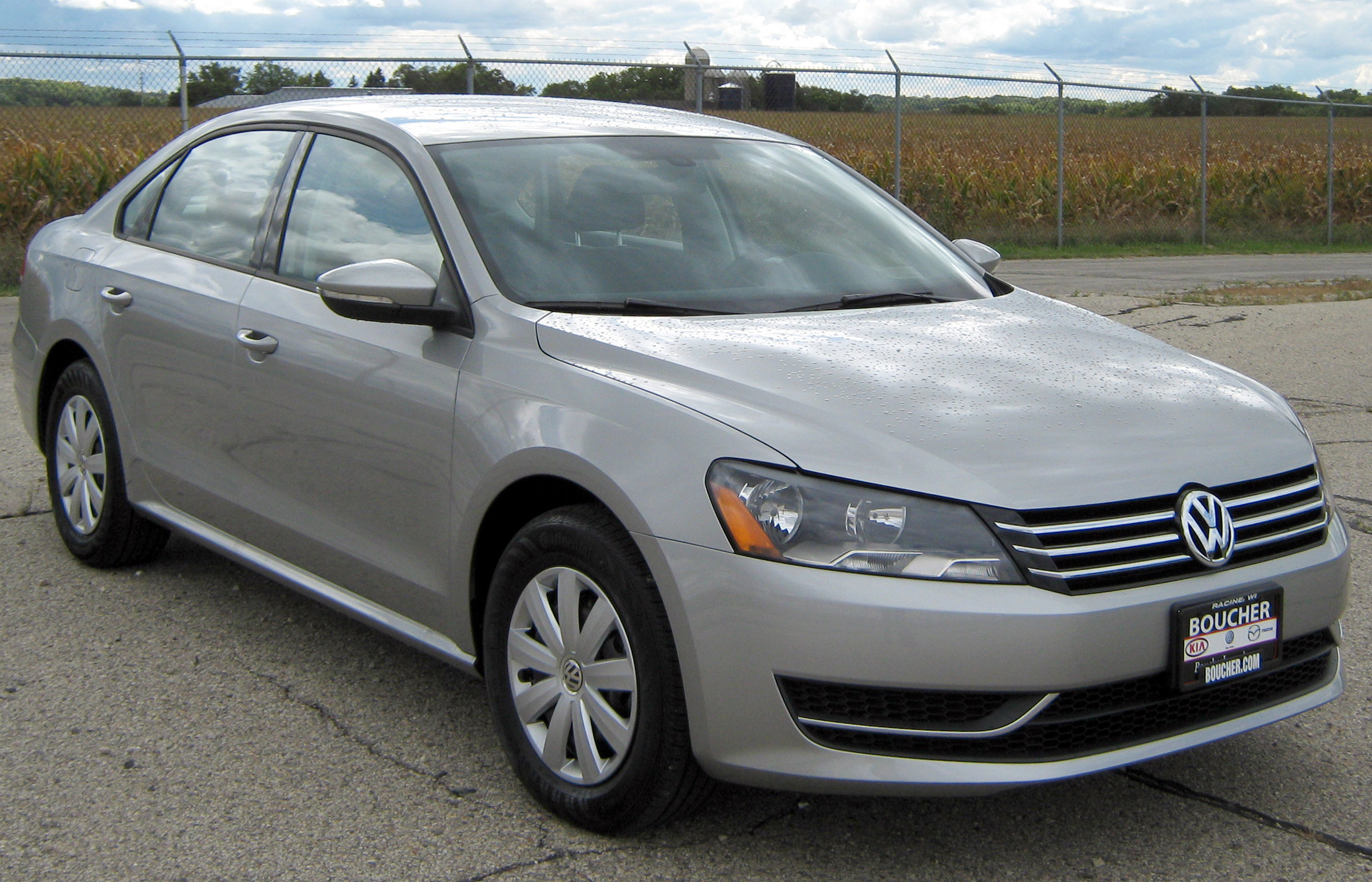
Volkswagen Passat 2011–2018

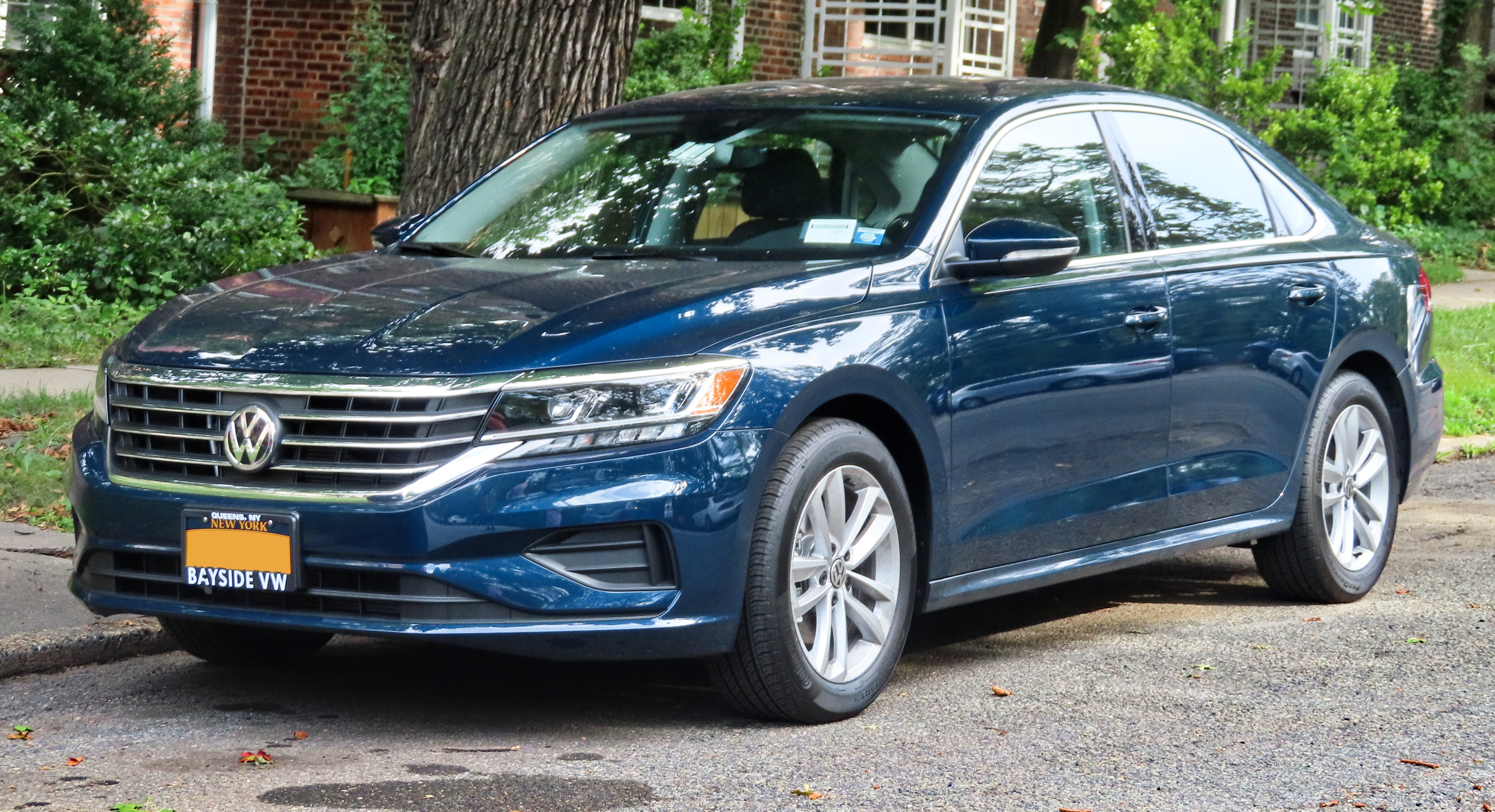
Volkswagen Passat 2019–2022

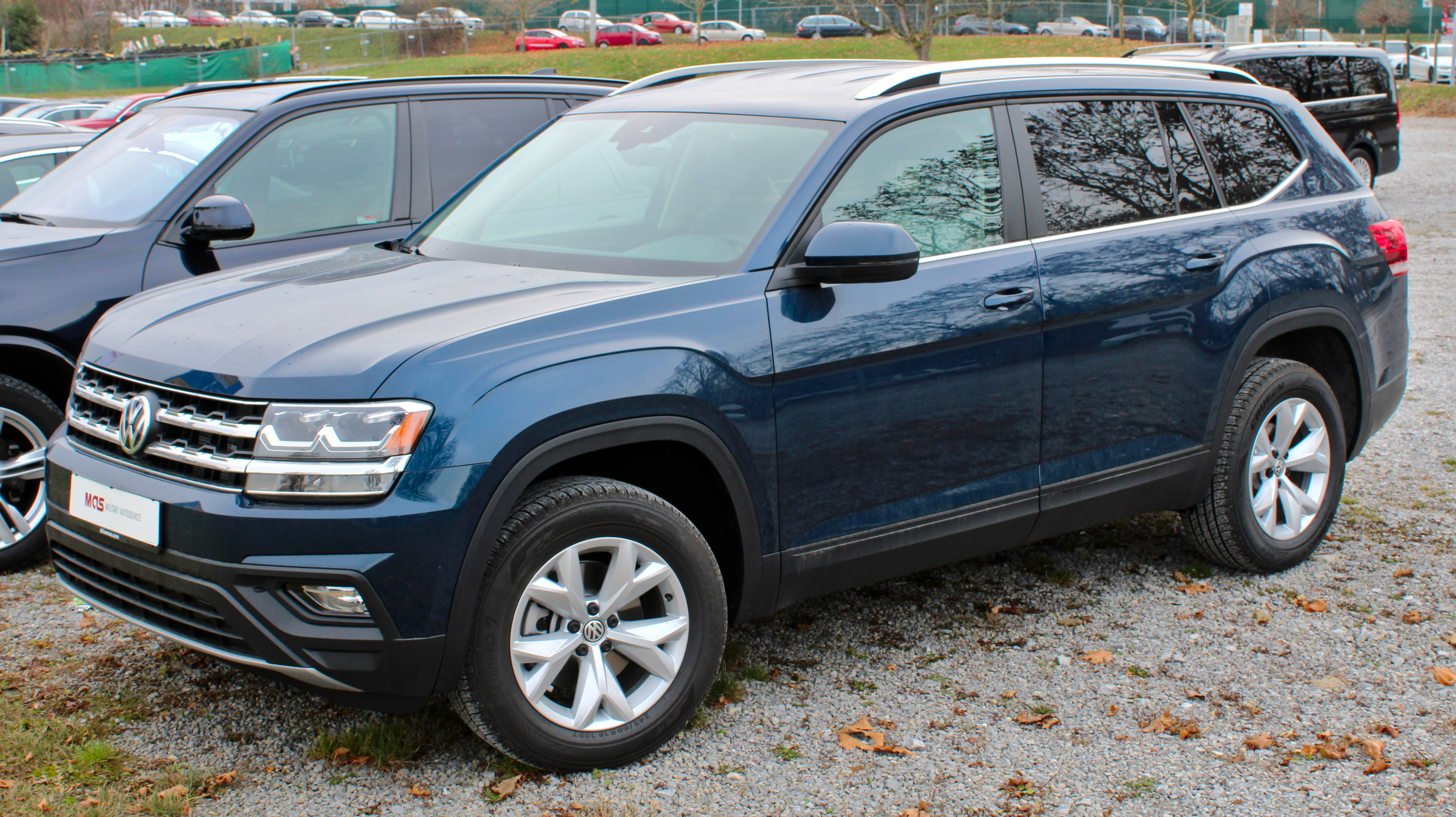
Volkswagen Atlas

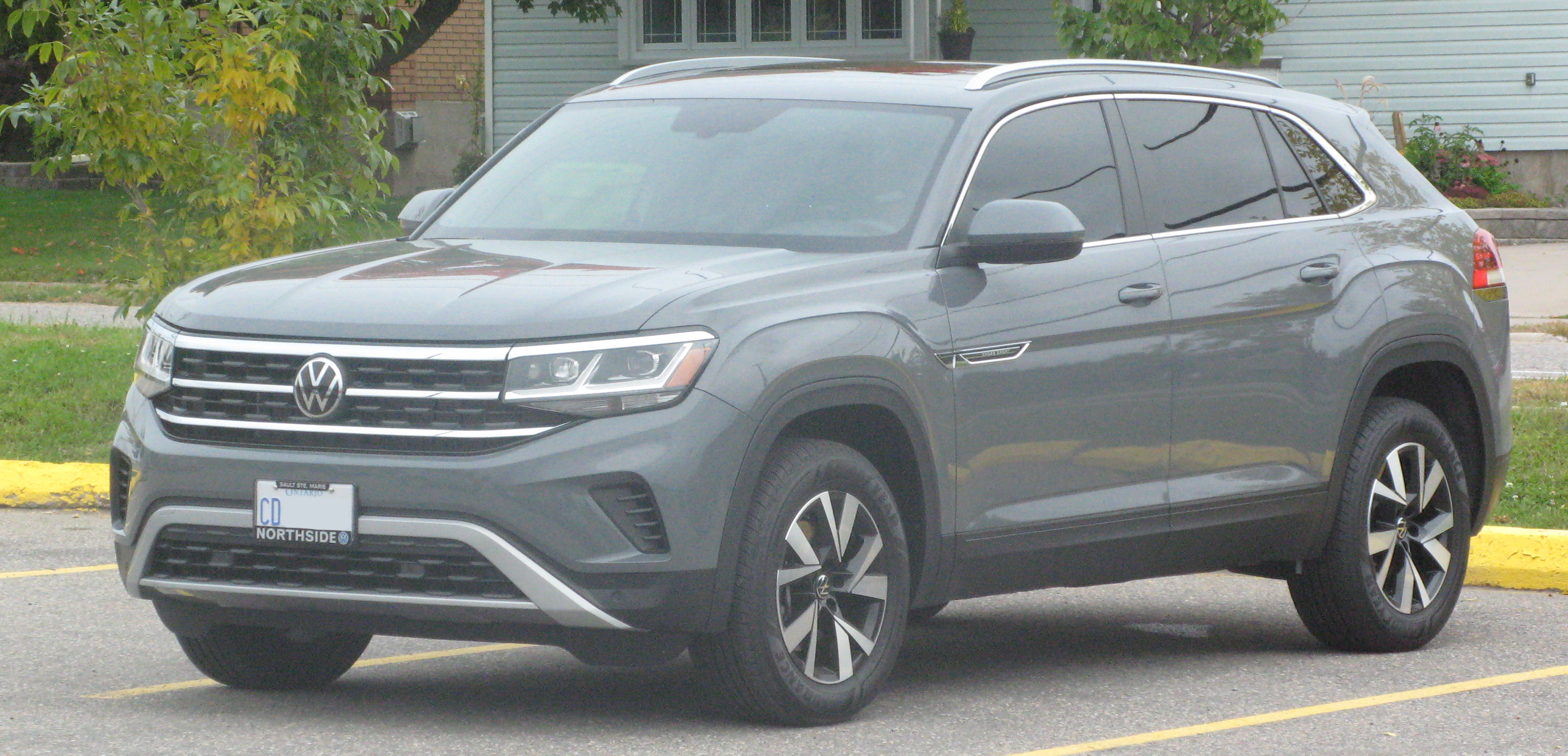
Volkswagen Atlas Cross Sport

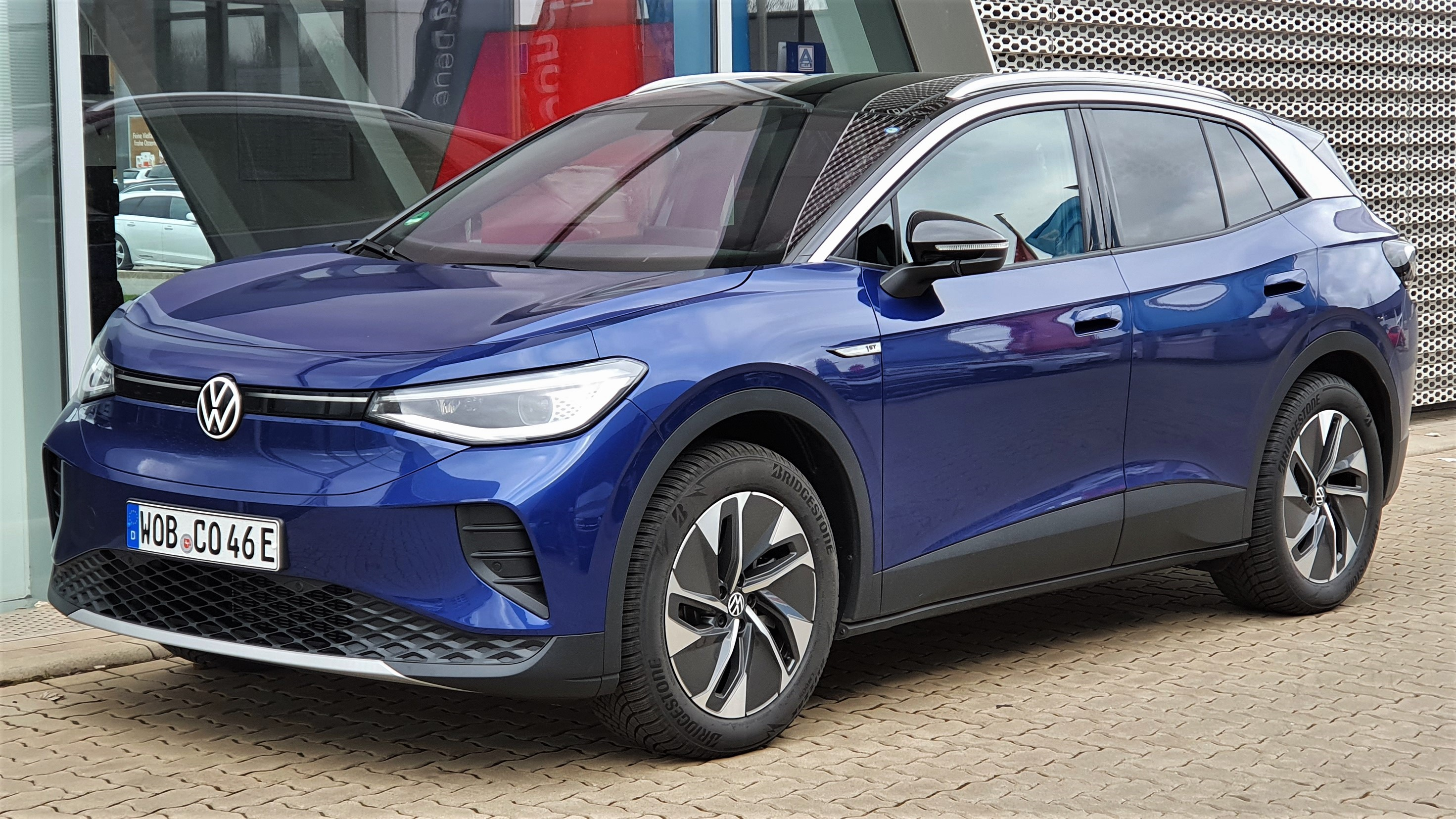
Volkswagen ID.4

== Design ==
The Volkswagen Chattanooga Assembly Plant includes a body shop, paint shop, assembly facility, a Market Delivery Options (MDO) building, technical testing center, employee training facility with classrooms, an apprentice-training school and a full-size practice paint booth, a supplier park for eight companies, and a 32,000-square-foot (3,000 m^{2}) healthcare center with a gym, childcare facilities, and medical services.

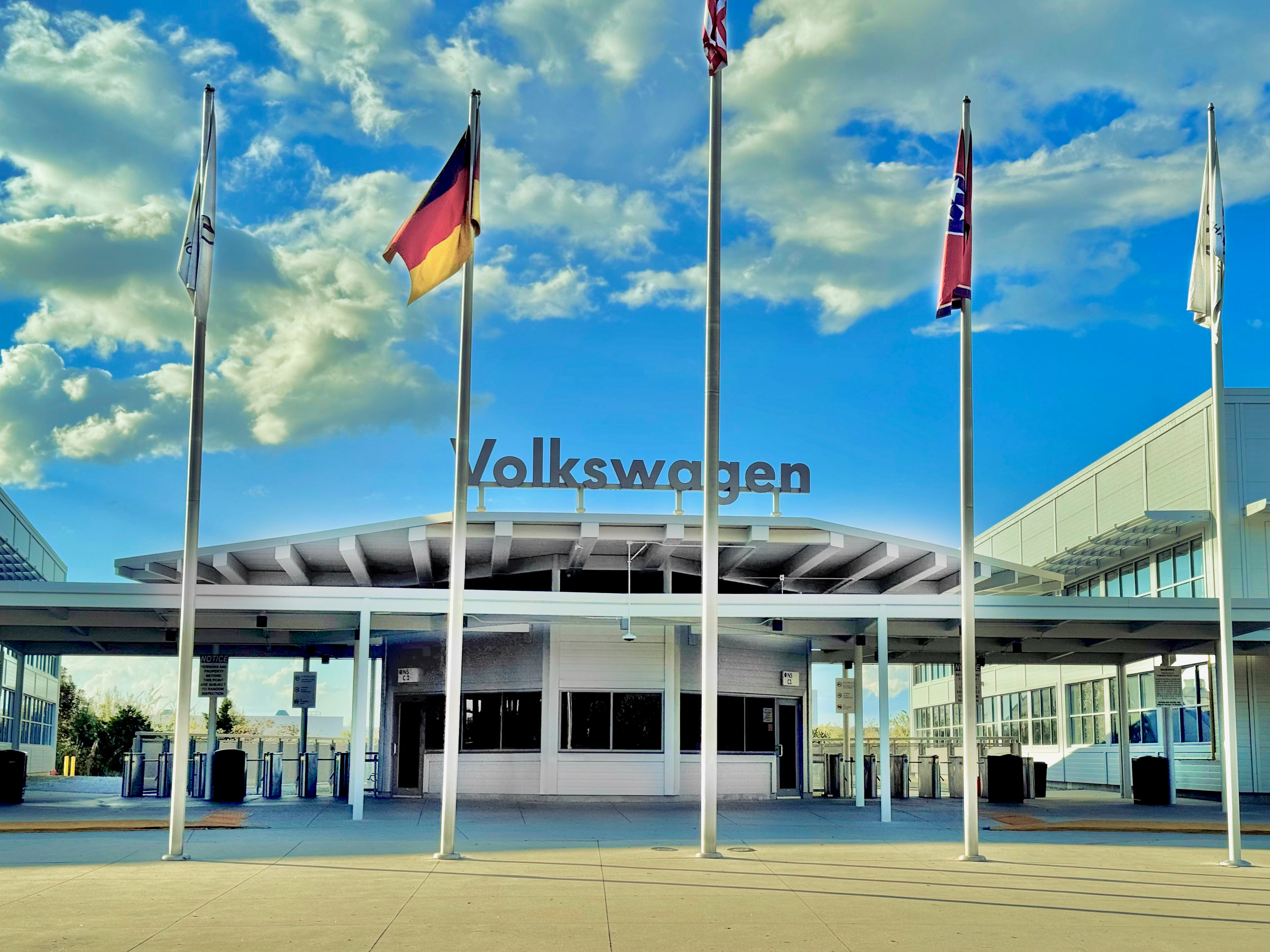
The front entrance

The plant has the flexibility to build any of the company's front-engine/front-wheel-drive vehicles in A, B, or C-segments. The rolling-dip paint shop is sized to handle a wide range of vehicle sizes. The plant is not designed to manufacture large vehicles.> The factory includes 383 robots in the body shop, which is approximately 77 percent automated. There are 4,730 weld spots and 292 welding guns. Output is about 31 cars per hour. The plant is organized with its major process areas – body shop, main assembly, and paint shop – in a stacked configuration with major checkpoints arranged in a concentric-circle layout – to eliminate long walks between factory areas, to investigate a problem, for example. The body assembly line uses diode lasers.

VW announced it would seek certification for the complex's Leadership in Energy and Environmental Design. In November 2011, VW announced that the 2012 model of the Passat was named the 2012 Motor Trend Car of the Year. In December 2011, the Assembly Plant became the first auto plant in the world to get the LEED platinum certification. A 9.5 megawatt solar park supplies 13 GWh of electricity per year, 12% of plant consumption.

The Volkswagen Chattanooga Assembly Plant was designed by the Nashville engineering and architecture firm SSOE, the firm Environmental Resources Management (ERM) for the environmental permitting process, and Alberici Constructors, Inc. for the construction management of the facility. The Port of Savannah, Georgia's Garden City Terminal, handles imported auto parts in containers for the plant.

== Cost and incentives ==
Volkswagen invested approximately one billion U.S. dollars to construct the facility, with local, state, and federal governments subsidizing the project with an estimated $577 million in incentives. Alabama had offered Volkswagen incentives of $385 million, the state's most ever for an auto project. Mississippi offered Toyota incentives totaling $294 million in 2007 for an assembly plant at Blue Springs. Kia received about $324 million in incentives from Georgia. Volkswagen had researched 398 possible sites before narrowing the choice to the states of Michigan, Alabama, and Tennessee.

== Work council and labor unions ==
The Volkswagen Chattanooga Assembly Plant has attracted international attention after it was proposed that employees elect a union to implement a work council that has co-determination, consultation, and participation rights with management.

The United Auto Workers attempted unsuccessfully to unionize the Chattanooga plant in 2014. This was defeated in a 712-626 vote. It was backed by Volkswagen and the IG Metall union in Germany to negotiate with management on day-to-day working matters at the plant. There was, however, considerable opposition from US business groups and Republican politicians.

The UAW again attempted to unionize the plant in June 2019. This failed by a 52 to 48 percent margin. Unlike in 2014, Volkswagen management was not supportive of the union vote.

On February 6, 2024, the UAW announced that over 50% of the 4,100 hourly workers at the plant have signed union membership cards. The VW union drive happens shortly after UAW's successful strikes in 2023 at the "Big Three" automobile manufacturers, Ford, General Motors, and Stellantis. On April 19, the plant's workers voted to unionize. In the historic election, the hourly workers voted 2628 in favor of the union (73%) and 985 against the union (27%).

== Overview timeline ==
- 1988: Volkswagen closes its Westmoreland Assembly Plant
- 2006: Construction completed for the Interstate 75 interchange near Ooltewah, Tennessee.
- July 2008: Volkswagen announces its intention to build the Chattanooga Assembly Plant.
- Fall 2008: Preliminary construction begins.
- January 2009: January groundbreaking rescheduled indefinitely.
- May 2009: Ceremonial "Wall-Raising" (vs. groundbreaking).
- October 2010: CSX and Norfolk Southern Railway announced they would again serve the site after completing a $6.6 million project to provide dual rail service to the Volkswagen Assembly Plant. The newly completed yard was dedicated on April 6, 2011. Work included "the biggest rail overhaul in and around the Volunteer Army Ammunition Plant since the tracks were laid during World War II."
- April 18, 2011: First Passat rolls off the assembly line.
- April 2011: Completion of the site's $7.5 million 850-foot span steel-and-glass pedestrian bridge and guardhouse.
- May 24, 2011: The plant was inaugurated on May 24, 2011, by Martin Winterkorn, Chairman of the Board of Management of Volkswagen Group and the U.S. Secretary of Transportation Ray LaHood with Klaus Scharioth, German Ambassador to the United States, Bill Haslam, Governor of Tennessee, Jonathan Browning, President and CEO of Volkswagen Group of America, as well as U.S. Senators Bob Corker and Lamar Alexander in attendance. The actor Max Page played a small version of Darth Vader in a 2011 Volkswagen television commercial and also attended in costume.
- September 8, 2011: The plant manufactured its 10,000th car, a white Passat TDI. The number included pre-series cars, technical training cars, dealer experience cars and customer cars.
- November 2011: The Passat is named the 2012 Motor Trend Car of the Year.
- December 2011: The plant became the first auto plant in the world to receive an LEED platinum certification.
- February 7, 2012: The plant manufactured its 50,000th Passat.
- May 2012: The plant manufactured its 100,000th Passat.
- May 24, 2013: The plant manufactured its 250,000th Passat.
- December 14, 2016: The plant starts series production of the Volkswagen Atlas.
- January 14, 2019: VW announces at the Detroit Auto Show that the plant will begin building the ID. Crozz crossover and the ID. Buzz van, a reimagining of the iconic van of the 1960s and 70s, in 2022.
- July 26, 2022: Production of the Volkswagen ID.4 commenced.
- April 19, 2024: Volkswagen hourly workers overwhelmingly voted in favor of UAW representation to become the first unionized transnational automotive plant in the South. The workers voted 2,628 (73%) for the union, and 985 against (27%).
- February 19, 2026: Volkswagen workers at the plant ratified their first union contract with 96% of workers voting yes.
- April 2026: Production of the Volkswagen ID.4 ended.
