= Sportback (disambiguation) =

Sportback is a term used by Audi for 5-door hatchback/fastback/coupe SUV models. It is also used on some non-Audi cars such as the Mitsubishi Lancer Sportback. The "Sportback" designation was first introduced by Audi in 2004 with the launch of the Audi A3 Sportback, marking a shift from the traditional hatchback terminology to a more dynamic and upscale branding.

== Audi models ==
- A1 Sportback
- A3 Sportback
- A5 Sportback
- A7 Sportback
- Sportback concept
- Q3 Sportback
- Q5 Sportback
- Q8 e-tron Sportback

== Non-Audi models ==
- Mitsubishi Lancer Sportback
