= Audi A7 sportback h-tron =

German concept hybrid automobile

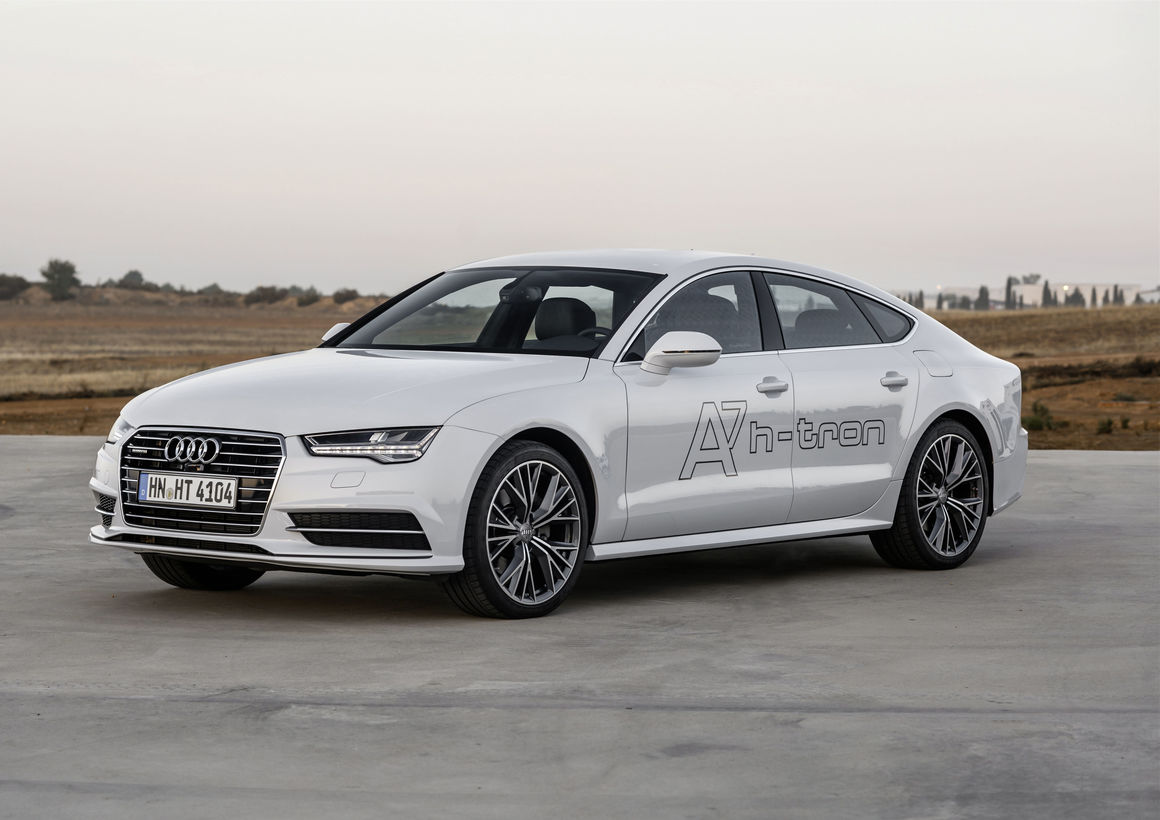
Side view of A7 h-tron quattro

The Audi A7 h-tron quattro is a concept hydrogen/electric plug-in hybrid automobile, released by Audi AG in the 2014 Los Angeles Auto Show. The A7 h-tron quattro keeps the same recognizable features of the other A7 variants, but typically has "A7 h-tron" decals.

The vehicle uses a series of hydrogen tanks connected to a fuel cell, that converts hydrogen into electricity which powers an electric drivetrain. The A7 h-tron quattro is not a production vehicle but is a working prototype.

== Design ==
=== Exterior and interior design ===
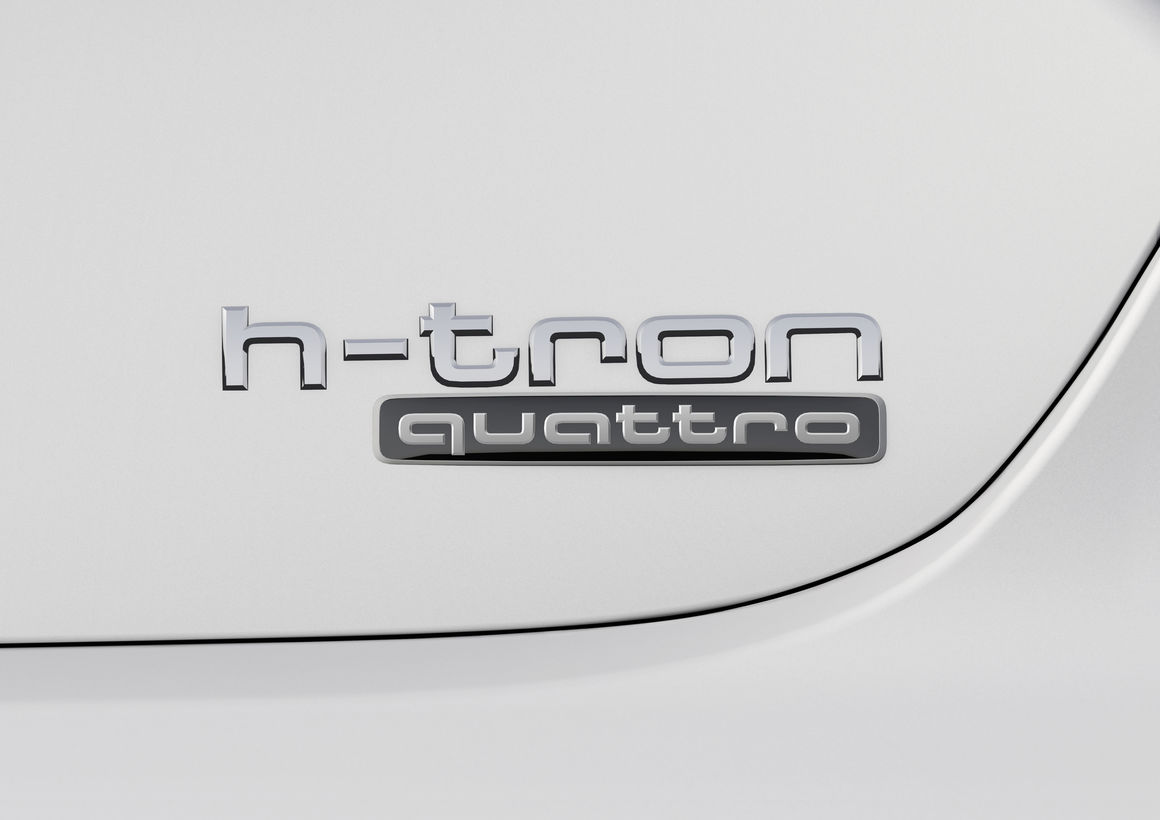
Badges at rear

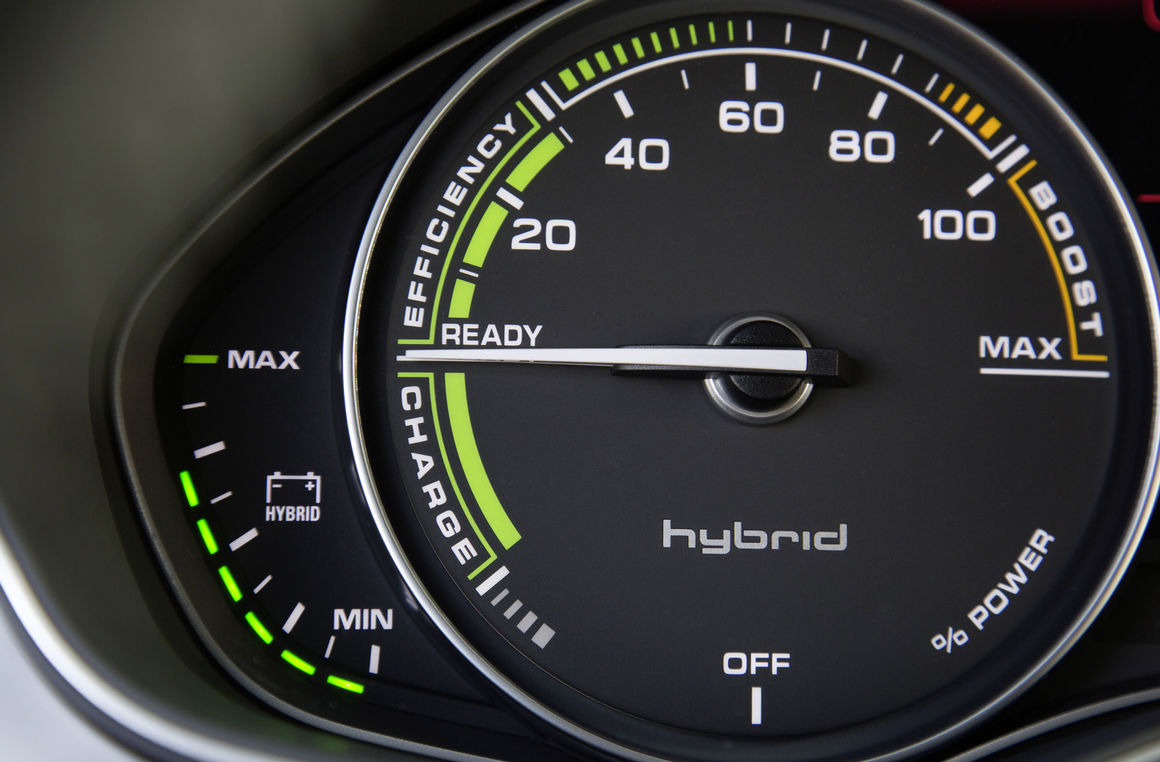
Efficiency counter in cockpit

As the A7 h-tron quattro is based on the A7 production car, nearly all parts of the vehicle are visually similar. The exterior features "h-tron quattro" badges on the rear trunklid, and "A7 h-tron" decals on the doors. Interior changes include a green and orange color scheme efficiency meter in place of the tachometer in the instrument cluster, and h-tron logos included in system splash screens.

=== Powertrain ===
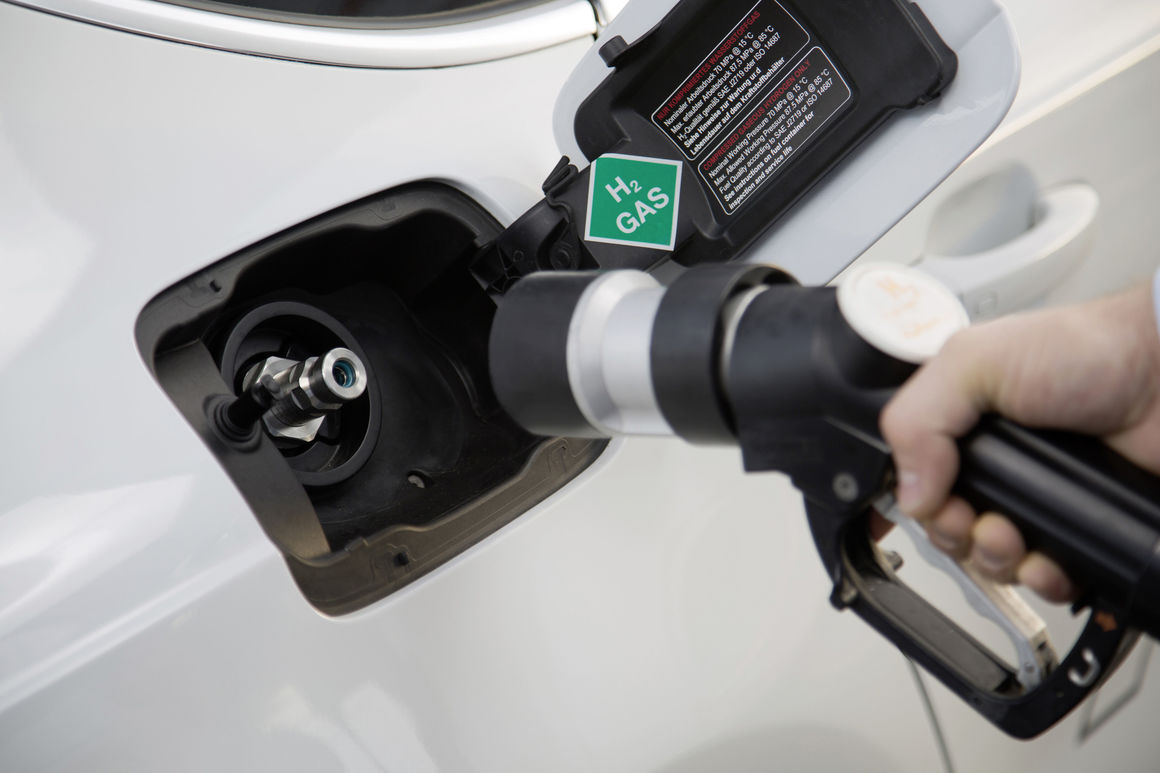
Image showing hydrogen pump nozzle, and vehicle inlet

The A7 h-tron quattro places many of the hydrogen powertrain components are in similar positions to their petrol and diesel equivalents; the fuel cell is located in the same position as an engine would be, the batteries and some of the hydrogen tanks are where the petrol or diesel tank would normally be located.

==== Hydrogen power system ====
The A7 h-tron has four high pressure hydrogen tanks, which can be refilled via an inlet inside of the fuel door. These tanks are constructed with an aluminium inner shell, and an outer carbon fibre reinforced polymer shell and hold fuel at up to 700 bar (10,000 psi).

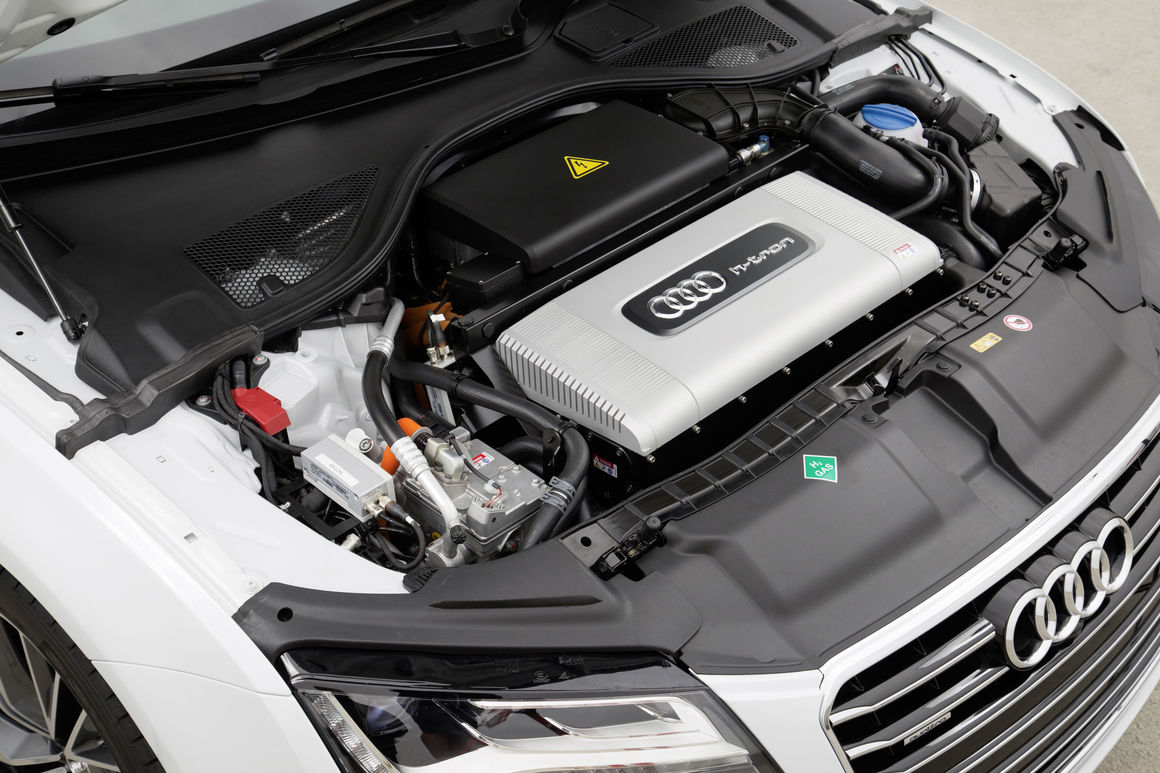
Fuel cell located under the bonnet

Hydrogen gas is fed through a pressure reducer to the hydrogen fuel cell where it reacts with atmospheric oxygen to form water and generating electricity. The fuel cell consists of a stack of 300 polymer membrane cells with a platinum-based catalyst, and operates between 230–360 volts. It is able to operate from cold starts from as low as −28 °C (−18 °F), and runs at 80 °C (176 °F) once warmed up.

==== Electric drive system ====
The electric drive system consists of a lithium-ion battery pack along with front and rear axle motors. The 8.8 kWh is sourced from the A3 Sportback e-tron and is located underneath the trunk floor. It can recharge in 4 hours off of a 230V household outlet, or in 2 hours from a 360V commercial charger. Each axle is powered by a permanent magnet synchronous AC motor generating 85 kW (114 hp; 116 PS) and 270 N⋅m (199 lb⋅ft) of torque, which can temporarily be boosted to 115 kW (154 hp; 156 PS), for a total of 170 kW (228 hp; 231 PS) and 540 N⋅m (398 lb⋅ft) of torque, or 230 kW (308 hp; 313 PS) in boost mode. This allows the vehicle to reach 62 mph (100 km/h) from a standstill in 7.9 seconds, and reach a top speed of 110 mph (177 km/h).

Electricity generated by the fuel cell is either fed directly into the motors or used to charge the batteries. During normal driving, the power for the motors is fed directly from the fuel cell, but if high load is requested, then power from the batteries is also used. The h-tron quattro uses a regenerative braking system, which is also commonly adopted by various other electric and hybrid vehicles.

==== Performance ====
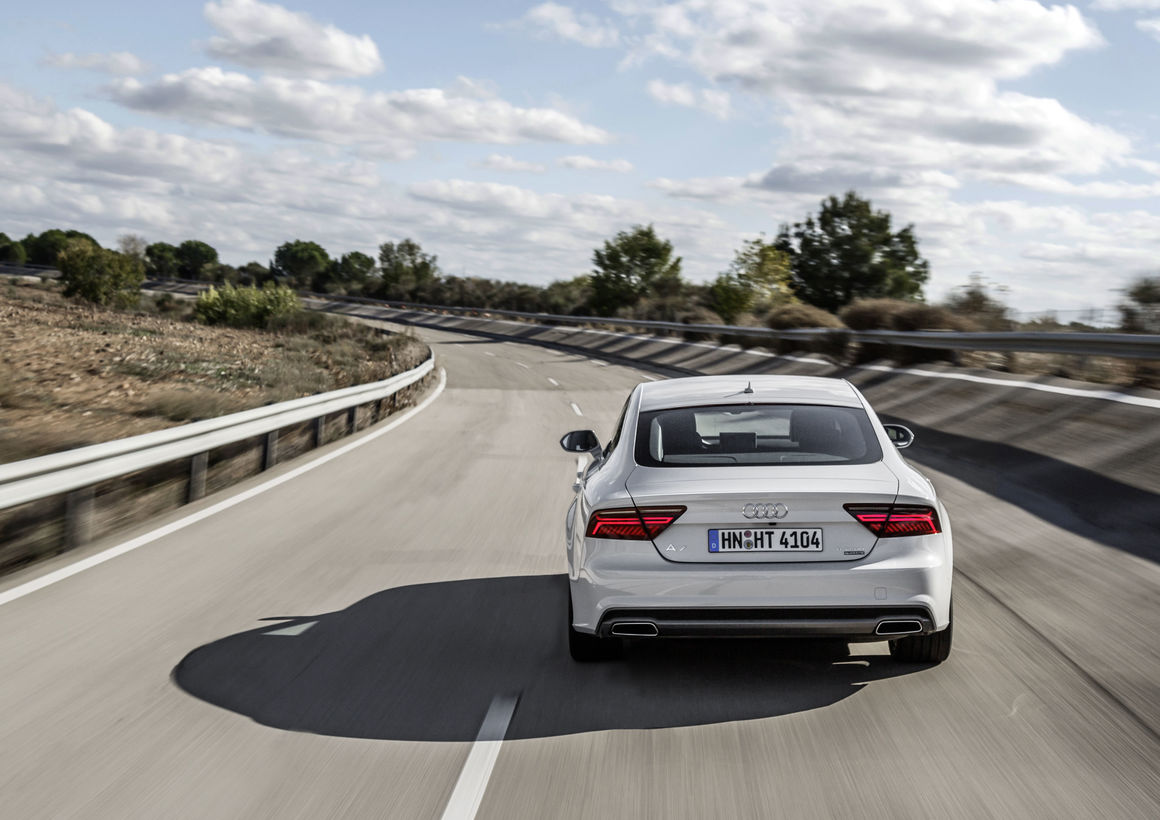

The vehicle weighs around 1,950 kg (4,300 lb), and can reach 62 mph (100 km/h) from a standstill in 7.9 seconds, with a top speed of 110 mph (180 km/h).

Electric-only range from the battery is over 50 km (31 mi), and the combined range exceeds 500 km (310 mi). On the NEDC test cycle, fuel consumption is 1 kilogram (2.2 lb) of hydrogen per 100 kilometres (62 mi).

== See also ==
- Audi A7
