= Audi A7 =

Executive luxury five-door liftback coupé

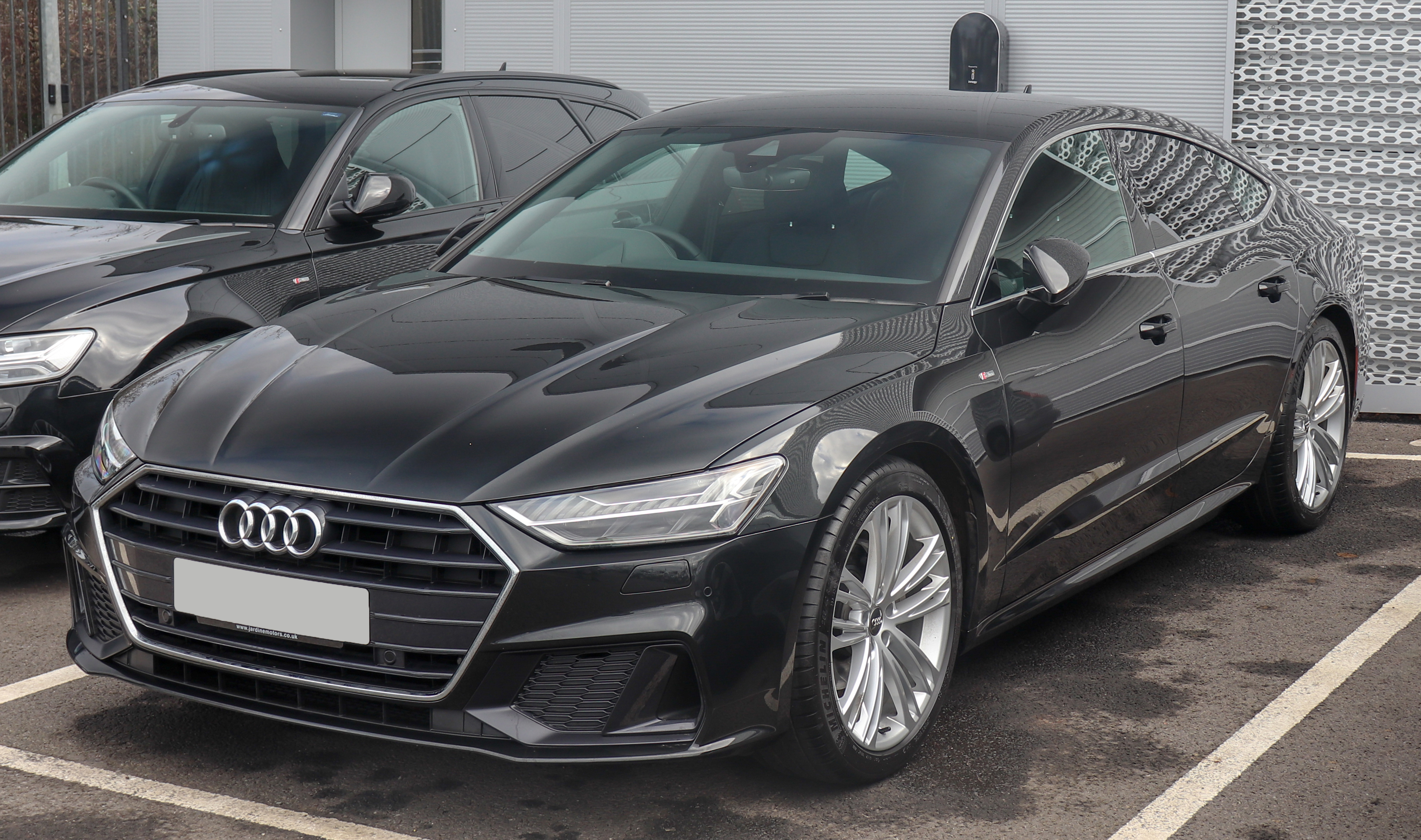
- Audi A7 S Line

Overview
- Manufacturer: Audi
- Production: 2010–2025; 2021–present (China, A7L)

Body and chassis
- Class: Executive car (E)
- Layout: Front-engine, front-wheel-drive; Front-engine, all-wheel-drive (quattro)
- Platform: MLB

Chronology
- Predecessor: Audi 100 Coupé S (spiritual)

The Audi A7 is an executive five-door liftback produced by Audi since 2010. The coupé variant of the Audi A6 saloon/estate, the Audi A7 features a sloping roofline with a steeply raked rear window and integrated boot lid (forming the Sportback), and four frameless doors. A sport version called the S7 has been made since 2012, and a high-performance model called the RS 7 has been in production since 2013. An extended-wheelbase three-box, four-door saloon derivative called the A7L has been produced in China since 2021.

== Audi Sportback concept (2009) ==
The Audi Sportback concept is a concept vehicle powered by a 3.0-litre V6 TDI clean diesel engine rated at 225 PS (165 kW; 222 hp) and 550 N⋅m (406 lbf⋅ft) of torque. It features a 7-speed S tronic transmission, quattro permanent all-wheel-drive system, five-link front suspension, continuous damping control shock absorbers, electromechanical steering, ceramic brake discs (380 mm front and 356 mm rear), front 6-piston monobloc aluminium brake calipers, rear floating-caliper brakes and 21-inch wheels. A preview of the facelifted 2015 A7 Sportback, the vehicle was unveiled at the 2009 Detroit Auto Show.

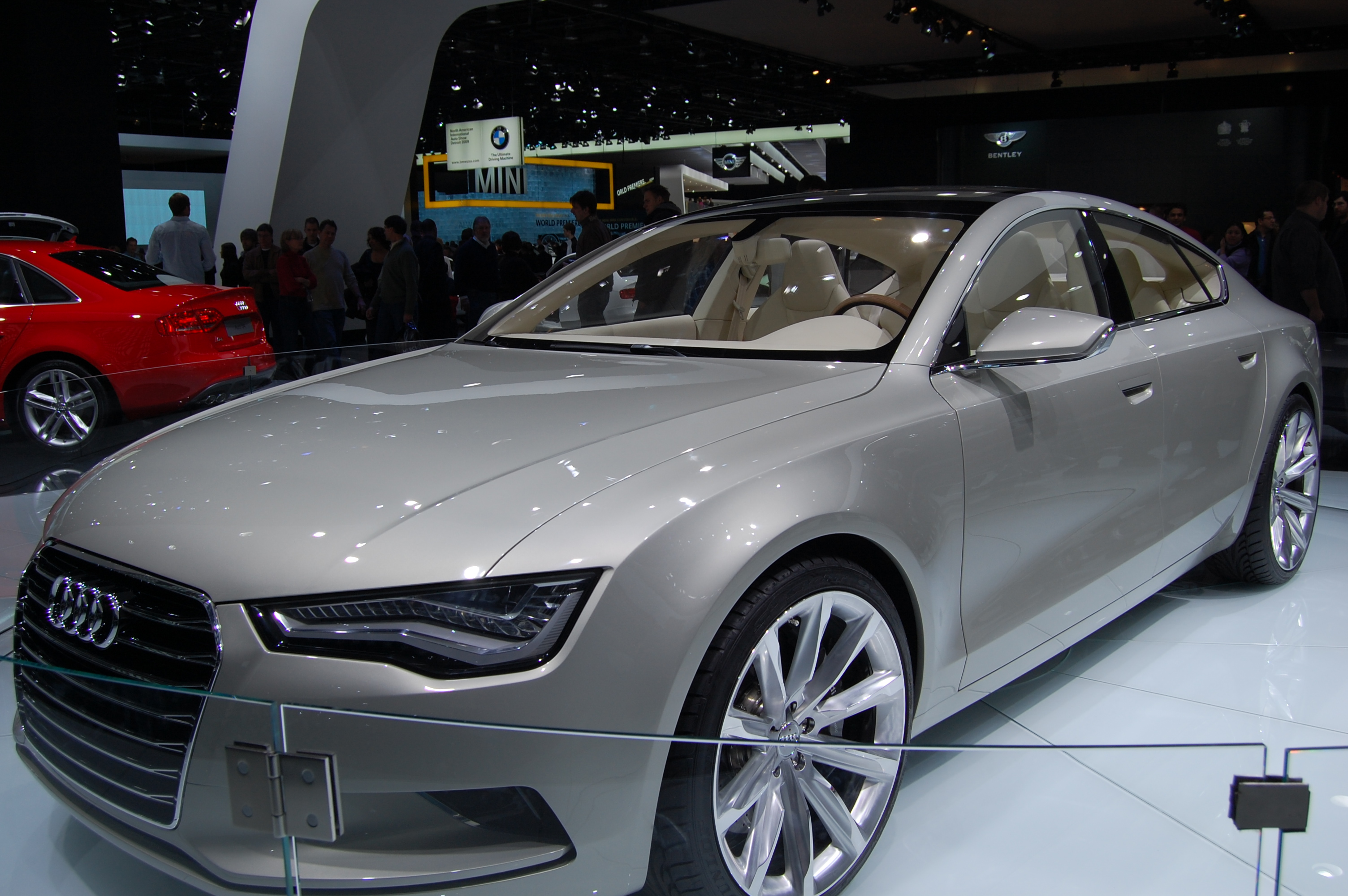
Audi Sportback concept in 2009

== First generation (Type 4G8; 2010) ==
First generation
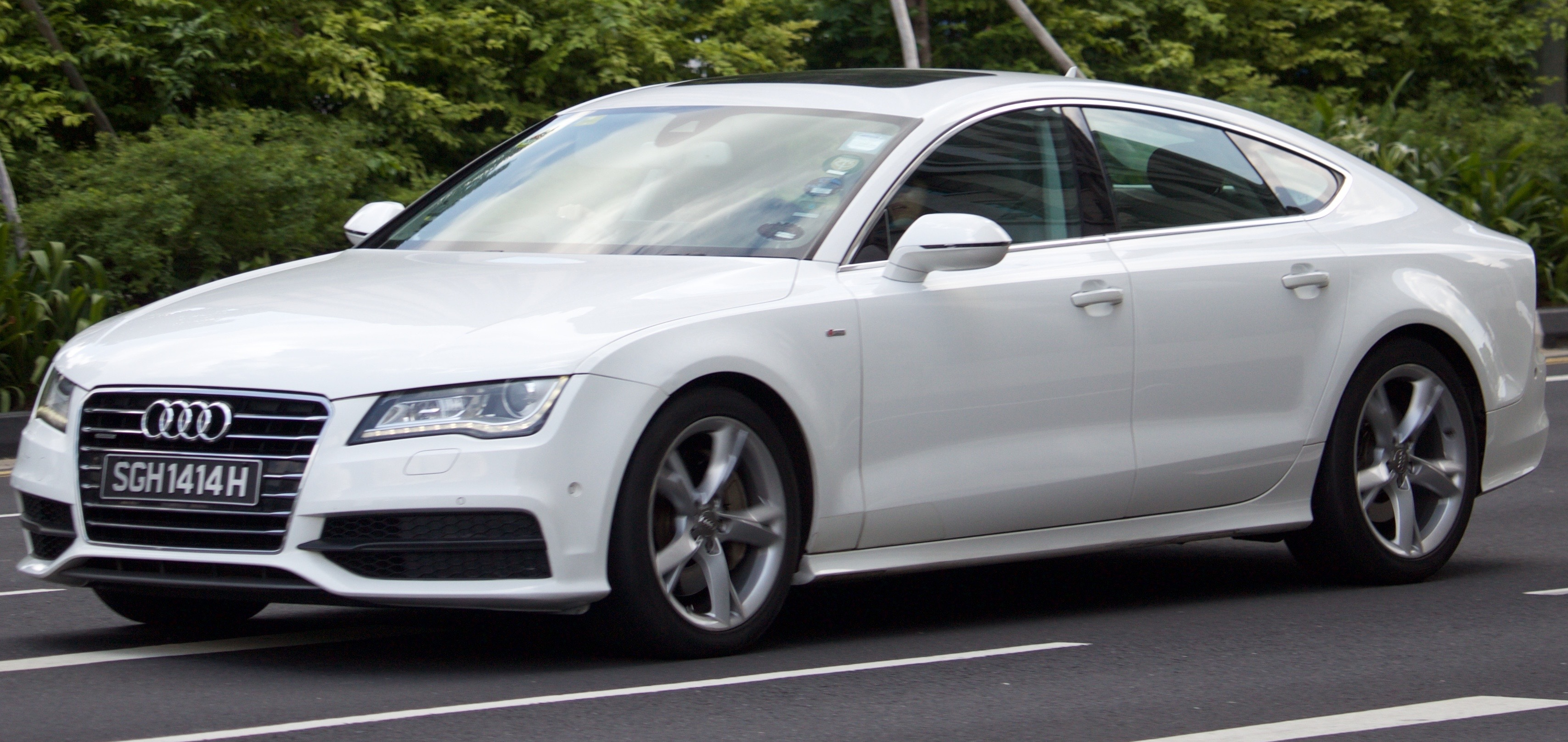

Overview
- Model code: 4G8
- Production: 2010–2018
- Assembly: Germany: Neckarsulm
- Designer: Stefan Sielaff (2006)

Body and chassis
- Body style: 5-door liftback
- Platform: Volkswagen MLB platform
- Related: Audi A6 (C7); Audi S7; Audi Sportback concept

Powertrain
- Engine: Petrol: 1.8 L I4 T FSI; 2.0 L I4 T FSI; 2.5 L V6 FSI (China); 2.8 L V6 FSI; 3.0 L V6 T FSI; 4.0 L V8 T FSI; Diesel: 3.0 L V6 TDI
- Transmission: 7-speed dual clutch S tronic; multitronic CVT; 8-speed ZF 8HP automatic (North American model)

Dimensions
- Wheelbase: 2,914 mm (114.7 in)
- Length: 4,974 mm (195.8 in)
- Width: 1,910 mm (75 in)
- Height: 1,420 mm (56 in)
- Curb weight: 1,910 kg (4,210 lb)

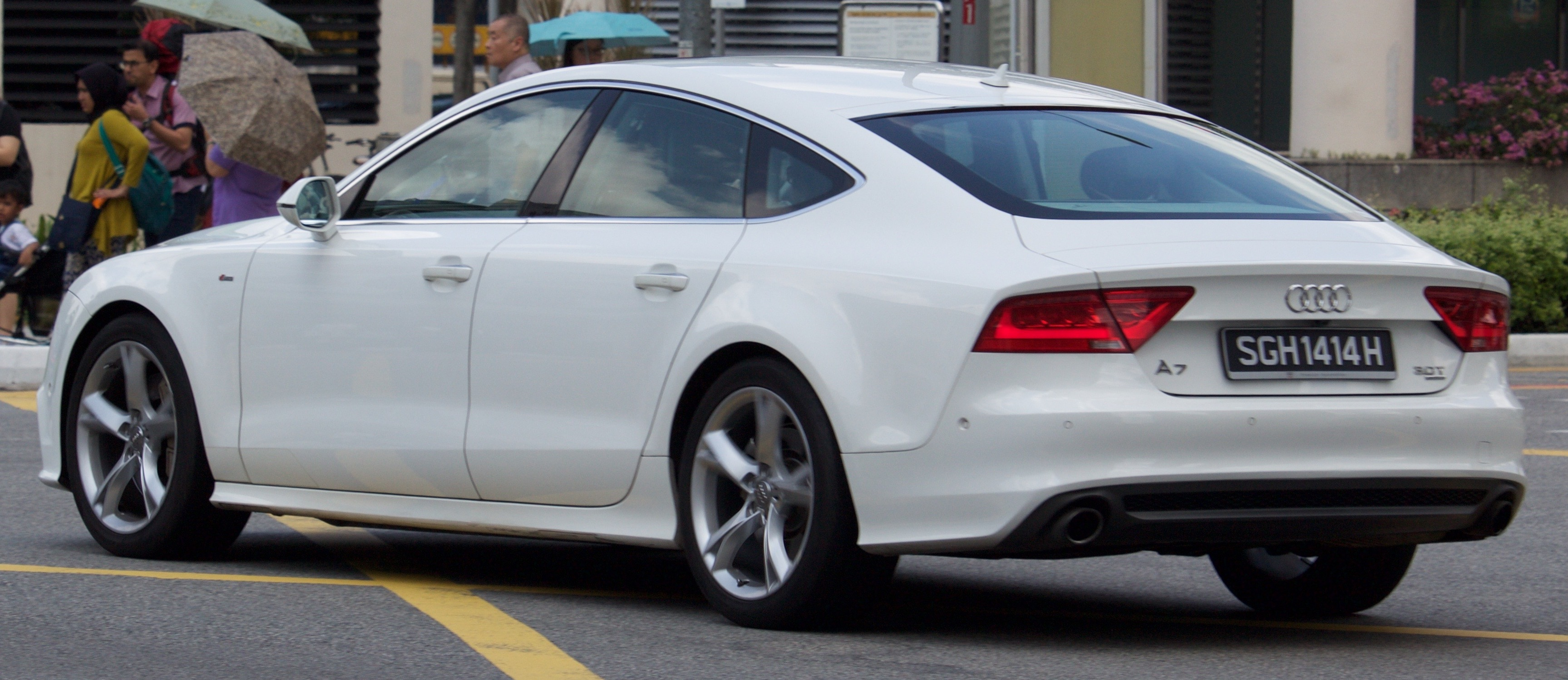
Pre-facelift Audi A7 3.0 TFSI quattro

=== Initial release ===
The A7 is in essence a four-door fastback version of the C7-series Audi A6, based on the Volkswagen Group MLB platform. The A7 was released before the more conventional A6 saloon/estate. Both cars share the same core structure, drivetrain, chassis, dashboard and interior, whilst the A7 has its own unique exterior panelwork. It also differs from the A6 in that it uses aluminium for much of its front body structure. The A7 was also the first fastback to appear within the Audi C-platform series since the Avant version of the C2 Audi 100, which was discontinued in 1982. The vehicle was unveiled in Pinakothek der Moderne art museum in Munich on 26 July 2010, and later at the 2010 Paris Motor Show, 2011 New York Auto Show, and Wörthersee Tour 2011 (in Misano Red).

The vehicles went on sale in autumn 2010. Early models include 2.8 FSI (204 PS (150 kW; 201 hp)) with multitronic, 3.0 TFSI quattro (300 PS (221 kW; 296 hp)) with seven-speed S tronic, 3.0 TDI quattro (245 PS (180 kW; 242 hp)) with seven-speed S tronic; followed by 3.0 TDI (204 PS (150 kW; 201 hp)) with multitronic.

The 2011 model year A7 introduces FlexRay high speed databus that controls all the driver assistance systems from the A8, but it adds head-up display and active lane assist. Full LED headlamps with Automatic high beam switching or Audi adaptive light (Xenon) with variable headlight range control. US models went on sale 2012 model year vehicles. Early models include 3.0 TFSI quattro (310 PS (228 kW; 306 hp)) with an 8-speed automatic transmission.

==== Audi S7 (2012–2017) ====
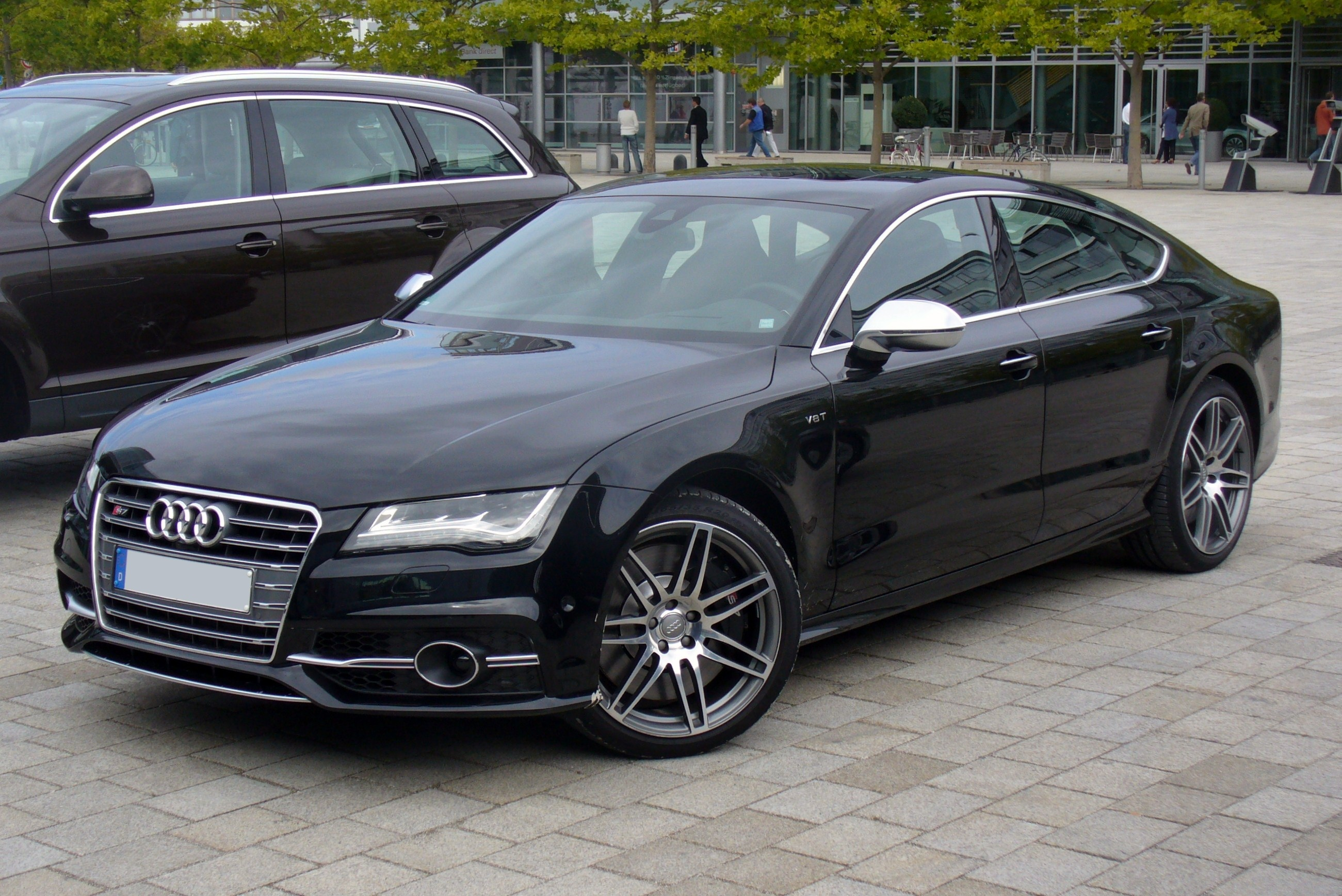

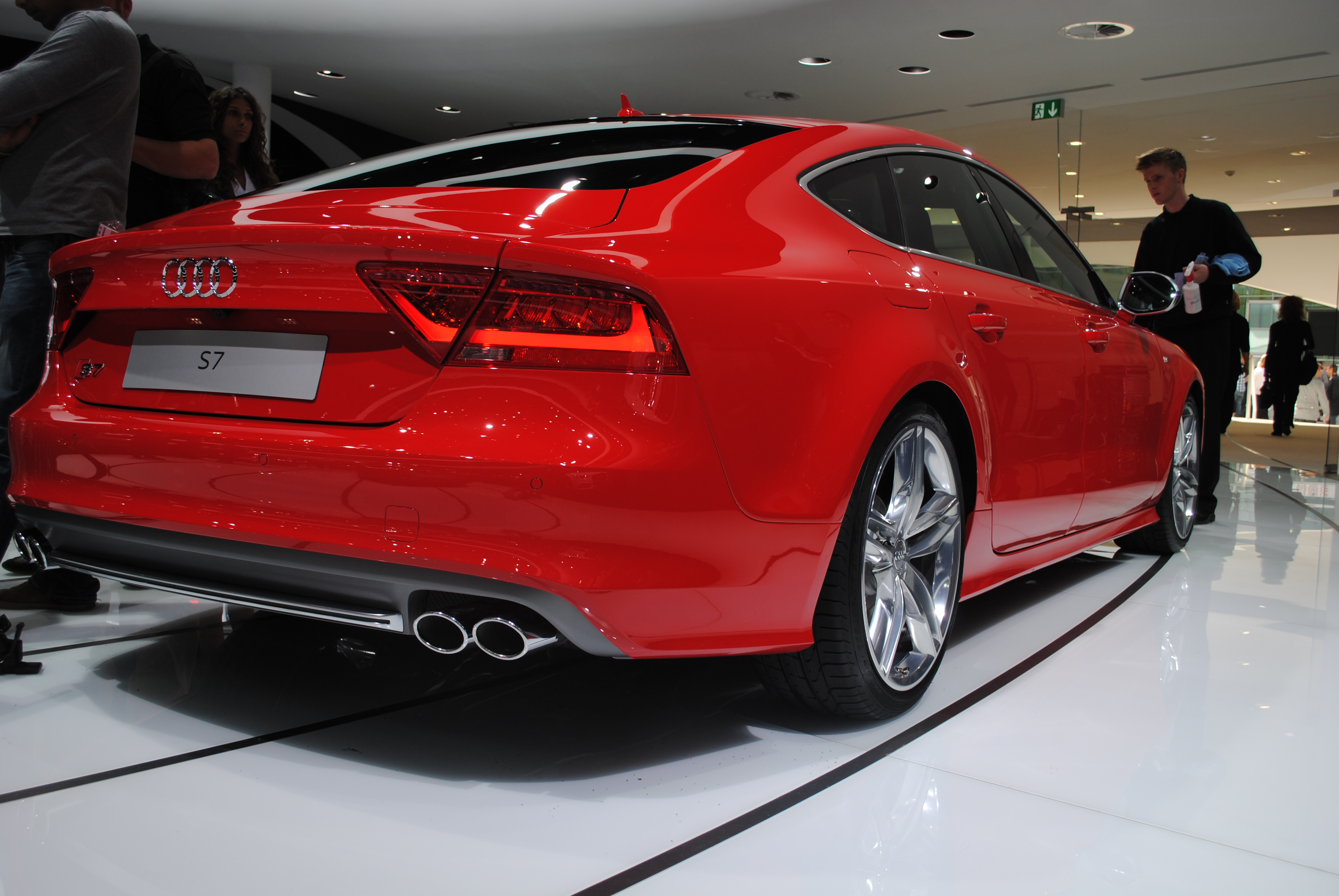
Audi S7 (pre-facelift)

The S7 is a version of the A7 with a 4.0 litres (3,993 cc) biturbo TFSI V8 engine rated at 420 PS (309 kW; 414 hp) and 550 N⋅m (406 lbf⋅ft) of torque, as well as a quattro four wheel drive system and 7-speed S–tronic gearbox. The S7 can accelerate from 0 to 100 km/h (0 to 62 mph) in 4.7 seconds. The vehicle was unveiled at the 2011 Frankfurt Auto Show, and later in 2012 Audi quattro Cup. Delivery of the S7 began in spring 2012.

==== Similar vehicles ====
Reviewers have cited the Mercedes-Benz CLS-Class as the inspiration to the Audi A7 in the four-door executive sedan market.

==== Engines and performance ====
The following internal combustion engines are available, with variations dependent on market.

Petrol engines
Model	Years	Type/code	Transmission	Power	Torque	0–100 km/h (62 mph)	Top speed
A7 2.0 TFSI	2014–2018	1,984 cc (121.1 cu in) I4 turbocharged	7-speed S tronic	252 PS (185 kW; 249 hp) at 5,000–6,000 rpm	370 N⋅m (273 lbf⋅ft) at 1600-4,500 rpm	6.9 s	250 km/h (155 mph)
A7 2.8 FSI	2010–2017	2,773 cc (169.2 cu in) V6	multitronic	204 PS (150 kW; 201 hp) at 5,250–6,250 rpm	280 N⋅m (207 lbf⋅ft) at 3,000–5,000 rpm	8.3 s	235 km/h (146 mph)
A7 2.8 FSI quattro	2010–2017	2,773 cc (169.2 cu in) V6	7-speed S tronic	204 PS (150 kW; 201 hp)	280 N⋅m (207 lbf⋅ft)	8.3 s	235 km/h (146 mph)
A7 3.0 TFSI quattro	2010–2017	2,995 cc (182.8 cu in) V6 supercharged	7-speed S tronic	300 PS (221 kW; 296 hp) at 5,250–6,500 rpm	440 N⋅m (325 lbf⋅ft) at 2,900–4,500 rpm	5.6 s	250 km/h (155 mph)
A7 3.0 TFSI quattro (US)	2012–2015	2,995 cc (182.8 cu in) V6 supercharged	8-speed Tiptronic	310 PS (228 kW; 306 hp) at 5,400–6,500 rpm	440 N⋅m (325 lbf⋅ft) at 2,900–4,500 rpm	5.6 s	250 km/h (155 mph)
A7 3.0 TFSI quattro (US)	2016–2017	2,995 cc (182.8 cu in) V6 supercharged	8-speed Tiptronic	333 PS (245 kW; 328 hp) at 5,300–6,500 rpm	440 N⋅m (325 lbf⋅ft) at 2,900–5,300 rpm	5.3 s	210 km/h (130 mph)
A7 3.0 TFSI quattro (US)	2017–2018	2,995 cc (182.8 cu in) V6 supercharged	8-speed Tiptronic	340 PS (250 kW; 335 hp) at 5,300–6,500 rpm	440 N⋅m (325 lbf⋅ft) at 2,900–5,300 rpm	5.3 s	210 km/h (130 mph)
S7 4.0 TFSI quattro	2012–2017	3,993 cc (243.7 cu in) V8 twin turbo	7-speed S tronic	420 PS (309 kW; 414 hp) at 5,500–6,400 rpm	550 N⋅m (406 lbf⋅ft) at 1,400–5,200 rpm	4.7 s	250 km/h (155 mph)
RS 7 4.0 TFSI quattro	2013–2017	3,993 cc (243.7 cu in) V8 twinscroll twin turbo	8-speed Tiptronic	560 PS (412 kW; 552 hp) at 5,700–6,700 rpm	700 N⋅m (516 lbf⋅ft) at 1,750–5,500 rpm	3.9 s	305 km/h (190 mph)

Diesel engines
Model	Years	Type/code	Transmission	Power	Torque	0–100 km/h (62 mph)	Top speed
A7 3.0 TDI	2010–2017	2,967 cc (181.1 cu in) V6 turbo	multitronic	204 PS (150 kW; 201 hp) at 3250–4,500 rpm	400 N⋅m (295 lbf⋅ft) at 1250–3,500 rpm	7.4 s	235 km/h (146 mph)
A7 3.0 TDI quattro	2010–2017	2,967 cc (181.1 cu in) V6 turbo	7-speed S tronic	204 PS (150 kW; 201 hp) at 3250–4,500 rpm	450 N⋅m (332 lbf⋅ft) at 1250–3,500 rpm	7.2 s	235 km/h (146 mph)
A7 3.0 TDI quattro	2010–2012	2,967 cc (181.1 cu in) V6 turbo	7-speed S tronic	245 PS (180 kW; 242 hp) at 4,000–4,500 rpm	500 N⋅m (369 lbf⋅ft) at 1,750–2,500 rpm	6.3 s	250 km/h (155 mph)
A7 3.0 TDI quattro	2011–???	2,967 cc (181.1 cu in) V6 turbo	8-speed Tiptronic	313 PS (230 kW; 309 hp) at 3,900–4,500 rpm	650 N⋅m (479 lbf⋅ft) at 1,450–2800 rpm	5.3 s	250 km/h (155 mph)
A7 3.0 TDI quattro (US)	2012–2017	2,967 cc (181.1 cu in) V6 turbo	8-speed Tiptronic	245 PS (180 kW; 242 hp) at 4,000–4,500 rpm	580 N⋅m (428 lbf⋅ft) at 1,400–3,250 rpm	6.3 s	250 km/h (155 mph)

==== Awards ====
In the ICOTY Awards, the Audi A7 was named the International Car of the Year in 2012. AutoWeek named the Audi A7 as the Best of the Best/Car for 2012. Esquire named the Audi A7 as the 2011 Esquire Car of the Year. Automobile named the Audi A7 "2012 Automobile of the Year".

==== Marketing ====
As part of the A7 Sportback product launch, a launch campaign was created in collaboration with the London advertising agency Bartle Bogle Hegarty. The birth story of the A7 Sportback became the inspiration of the Paper Liberation spot. As part of the A7 launch in the US, a papercraft version of 2012 Audi A7 was produced. As part of the S7 launch in the US, a Super Bowl commercial was produced.

==== 2012 update ====
The A7 3.0 TDI quattro (313 PS (230 kW; 309 hp), marketed as the A7 3.0 BiTDI quattro) was added to the UK market. The US market A7 3.0 TDI 'clean diesel' quattro was unveiled at the 2012 Los Angeles Auto Show, and went on sale in Fall 2013 as a 2014 model year vehicle.

==== A7 Sportback Black Edition (2013–) ====
The A7 Sportback Black Edition is a version of the A7 (excluding 3.0 TDI (204 PS (150 kW; 201 hp)), S7) for the UK market. It includes 21-inch rotor-design alloy wheels with a dark titanium finish with further lowered S line sports suspension, black grille and number plate surrounds and the window frame strips, and by privacy glass extending from the B-pillar rearwards; Piano Black inlays, sports seats upholstered in black Valcona leather, black headlining, BOSE audio system with DAB radio and AMI from SE specification and above, S line equipment package (satellite navigation, light and rain sensors, Xenon all-weather headlights and LED rear lights, Audi drive select adaptive dynamics system, Audi parking system plus, and keyless go), powered tailgate operation, electrically adjustable front seats and a powered retractable rear spoiler. Sales began in November 2012, with deliveries began in early 2013.

==== Audi A7 Sportback h-tron Concept ====
At the 2014 Los Angeles Auto Show, Audi showcased the A7 Sportback h-tron Concept, which is a modified A7 with a hydrogen-electric plug-in hybrid powertrain. It is fitted with four high pressure hydrogen fuel tanks which feed a fuel cell placed in the engine compartment, which then power two 85 kW (116 PS; 114 hp) electric traction motors on either axle for a total of 232 PS (171 kW; 229 hp) of output, or 310 PS (228 kW; 306 hp) in boost mode. It is also equipped with a 8.8 kWh Li-ion battery which can be charged in 4 hours on a domestic 230V Level 1 charger, or 2 hours on a 360V Level 2 charger. The hydrogen tanks, which have a carbon fiber exterior and aluminium shell, can hold 5 kg (11 lb) of fuel at a pressure of 700 bar (10,150 psi), which is enough to power the vehicle for 500 km (311 mi), and the battery has a range of 50 km (31 mi).

=== RS 7 (2013–2019) ===
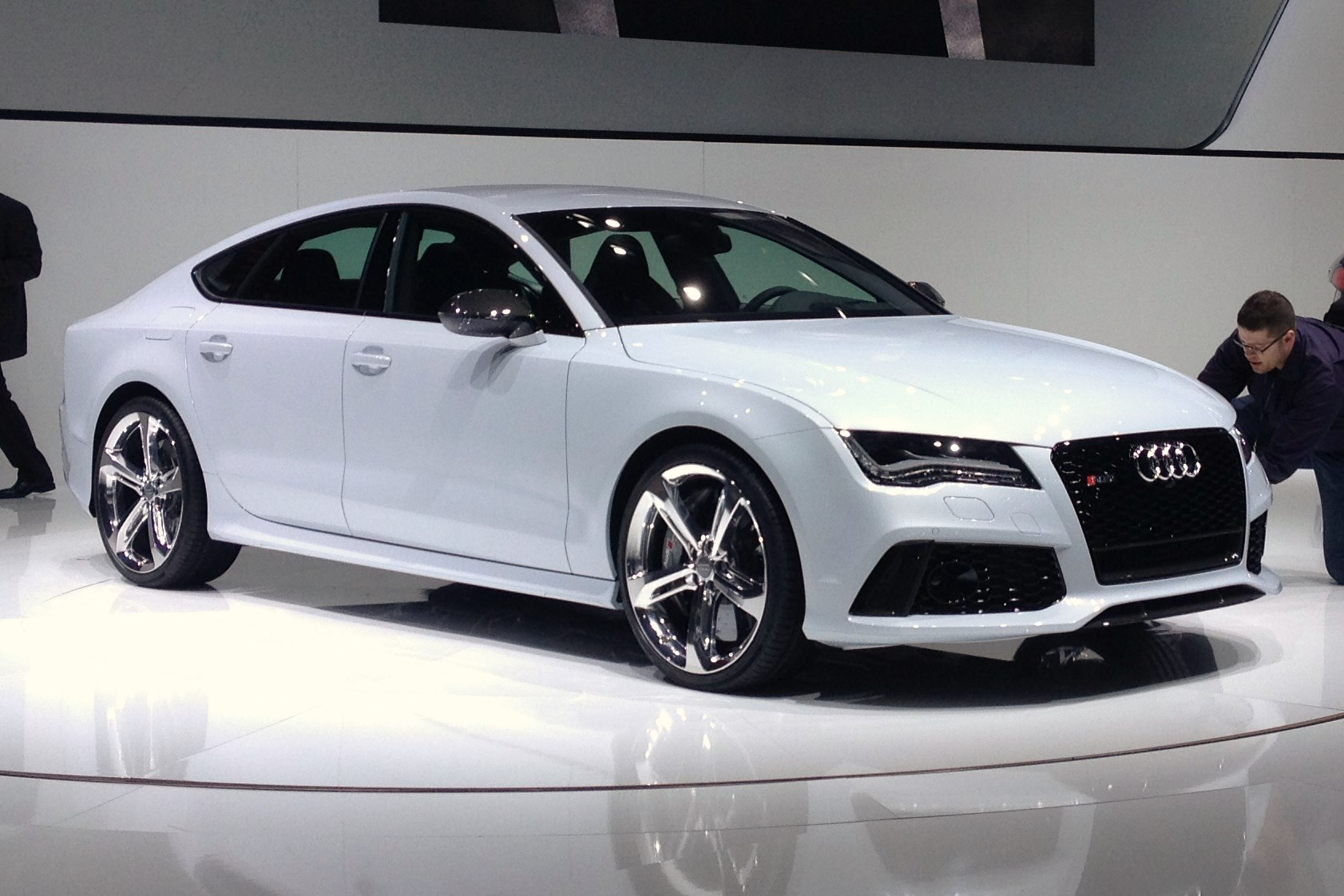
The 2014 Audi RS 7

The Audi RS 7 is a high performance variant of the A7 and was unveiled at the 2013 Detroit Auto Show. It has a 4.0 TFSI twin scroll twin turbo V8 engine rated at 560 PS (412 kW; 552 hp) and 700 N⋅m (516 lb⋅ft) of torque and features engine start stop and a cylinder deactivation system (which deactivates cylinders #2, #3, #5 and #8). The engine is paired to an eight-speed Tiptronic transmission, which transmits power to the wheels via a torque vectoring quattro all-wheel drive system with a self-locking center differential and oil cooler; an upgraded sport differential with two superposition gears is optional.

It is equipped with an adaptive air suspension, which can lower the ride height by 20 mm (0.79 in) in sport mode, with optional Dynamic Ride Control with stiffer tuning available. The steering rack has continuously variable assistance and ratio, and there is an optional dynamic all-wheel steering system. The RS 7 comes standard with four internally vented diameter brake discs with 390 mm (15.4 in) diameter front discs and black or optionally red painted six-piston calipers, which can be upgraded to 420 mm (16.5 in) carbon fiber ceramic discs with anthracite grey painted calipers. They are mounted behind polished 20-inch forged wheels in a seven twin-spoke design, with upgrade options for three different 21-inch cast wheel designs.

Exterior changes include a gloss black honeycomb grille and several matte aluminium or carbon fiber accents depending on the selected package. The rear features a power extending spoiler and two elliptical tailpipes. The RS 7 can be painted in a choice of ten body colours, including Nardo grey and an exclusive matte Daytona grey.

Interior upgrades include RS sport seats with side bolsters and integrated head restraints with RS 7 logos, which are upholstered with black Alcantara and leather with diamond quilting at center sections. These can be replaced with optional power-adjustable comfort seats with memory function upholstered in honeycomb-quilted Valcona leather in either black or lunar silver. The dashboard is finished with carbon inlays by default but has four additional material choices, and the headliner is black cloth but can be replaced with lunar silver cloth or black Alcantara.

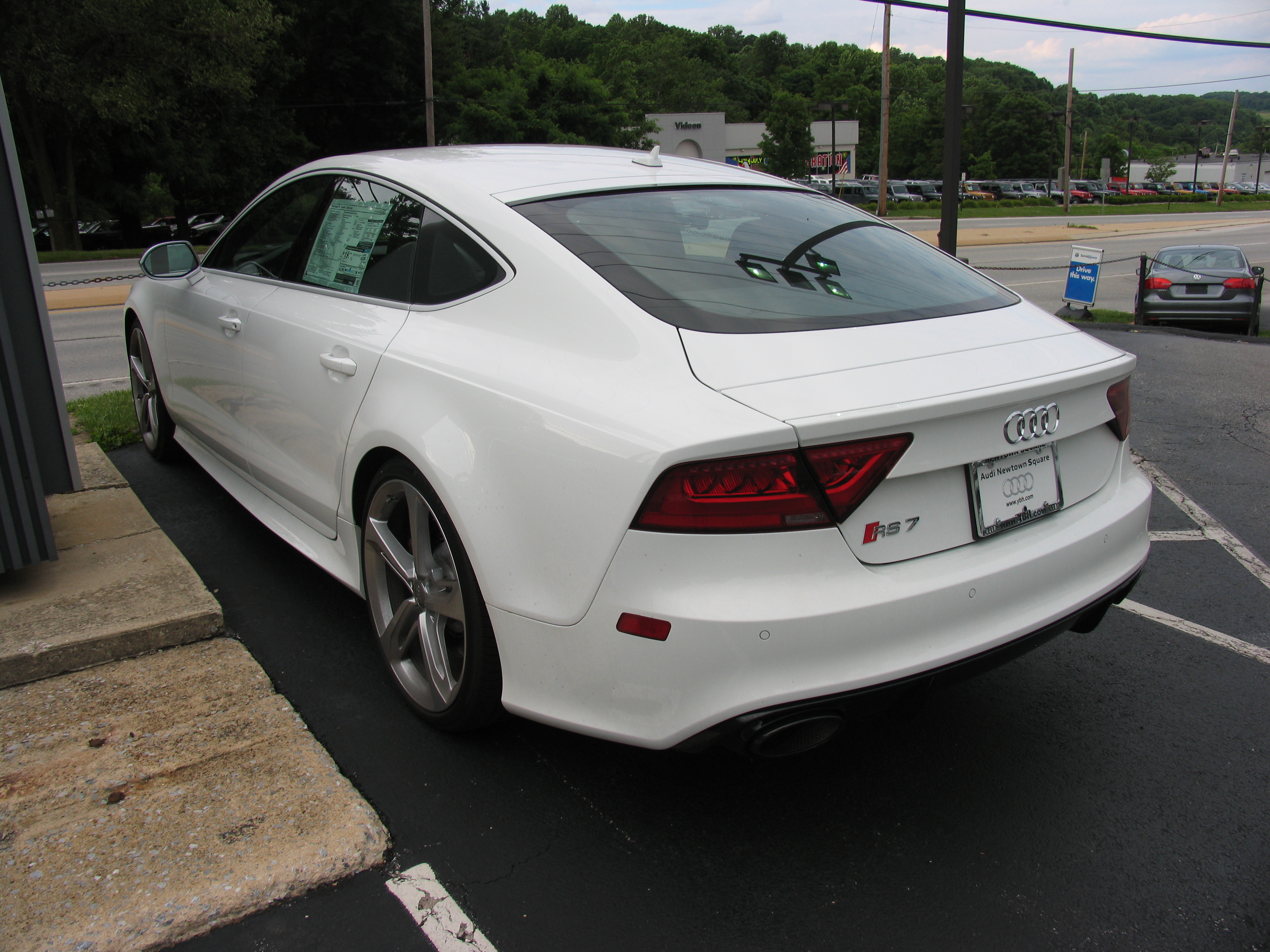
Audi RS 7

The RS 7 can accelerate from 0 to 100 km/h (0 to 62 mph) in 3.9 seconds and is limited to 250 km/h (155 mph). The optional Dynamic Package and Dynamic Package Plus increase top speeds to 280 km/h (174 mph) and 305 km/h (190 mph), respectively.

==== RS 7 Performance ====
Audi announced the RS 7 Performance alongside the RS 6 Performance on 22 October 2015. It is powered by the same 4.0-litre twin-turbo V8 engine as the standard RS 7, but now with 605 PS (445 kW; 597 hp) at 6,100-6,800 rpm and 750 N⋅m (553 lb⋅ft) of torque at 2,500-5,500 rpm. The top speed remains limited to 250 km/h (155 mph) as standard, and the optional Dynamic and Dynamic Plus packages raise the top speed to 280 km/h (174 mph) and 305 km/h (190 mph) respectively. The RS 7 Performance will accelerate from 0 to 100 km/h (0 to 62 mph) in 3.7 seconds and 0 to 200 km/h (0 to 124 mph) in 12.1 seconds. Despite the improved performance, the fuel economy and CO_{2} emissions ratings are unchanged from the standard RS 7.

=== Facelift (2015 model year) ===
Audi unveiled the 2015 A7 facelift in May 2014. Changes include:

- Styling tweaks to the car's exterior, engine line-up, transmission.
- Latest Multi Media Interface modular infotainment platform (faster Nvidia Tegra 3 processor, improved graphics) including handwriting recognition.
- Audi Connect telematics with 4G mobile internet (and mobile updates for the navigation map).
- Adaptive glare-free Matrix LED headlights.
- Improved Night Vision Assistant can now recognize animals.
- Both TFSI and all three TDI engines now meet the Euro 6 emission standard.
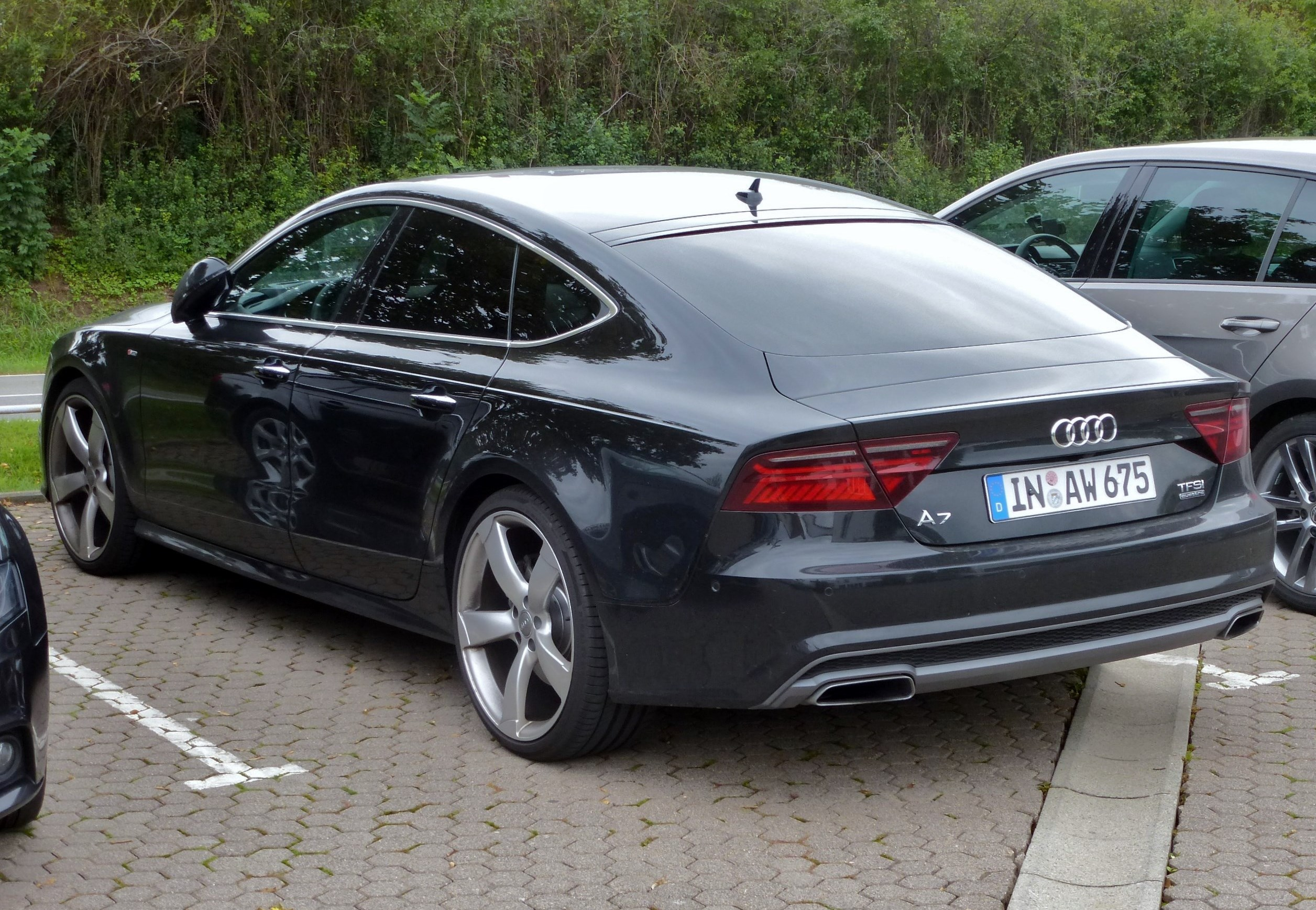
MY15 facelift

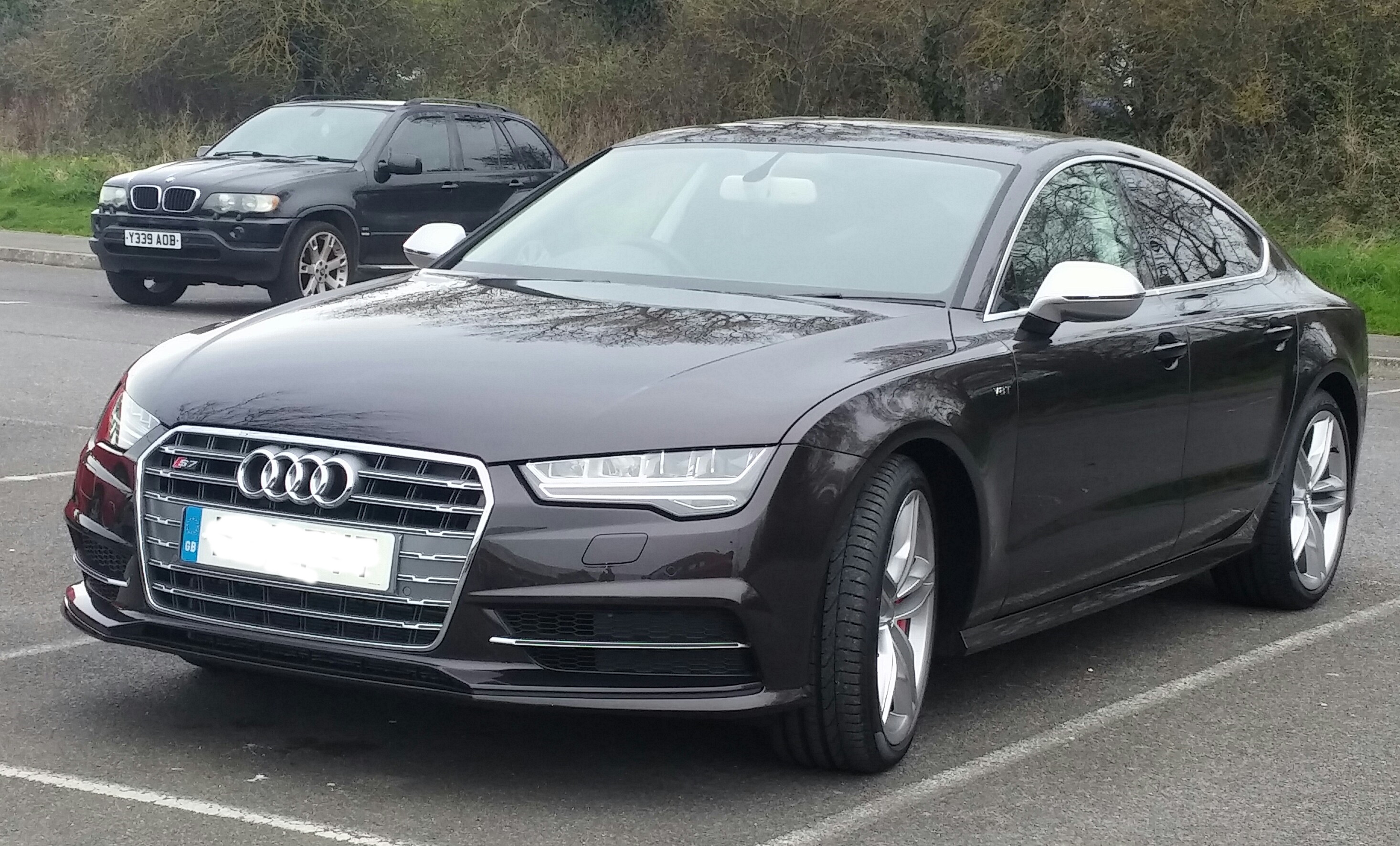
Audi S7 (facelift)

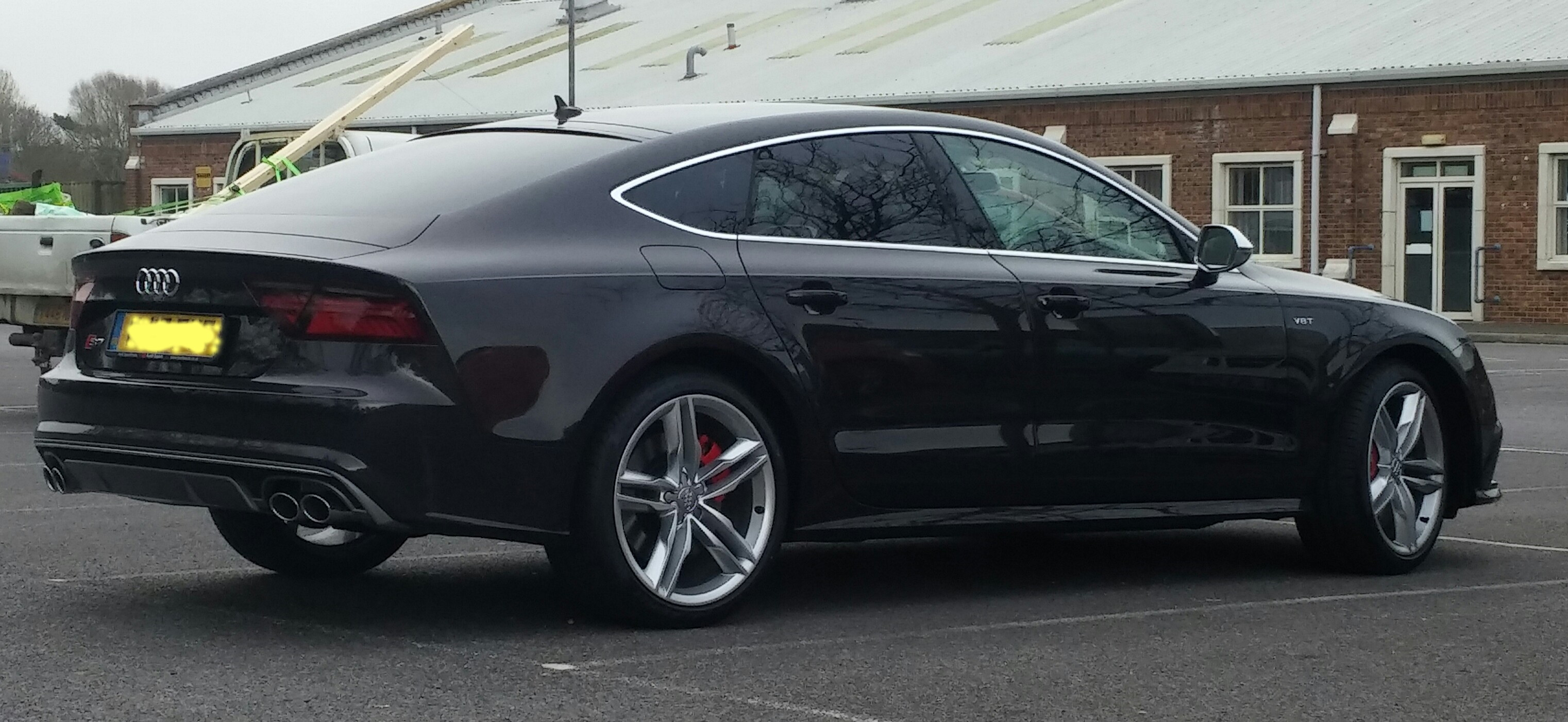
Audi S7 (facelift)

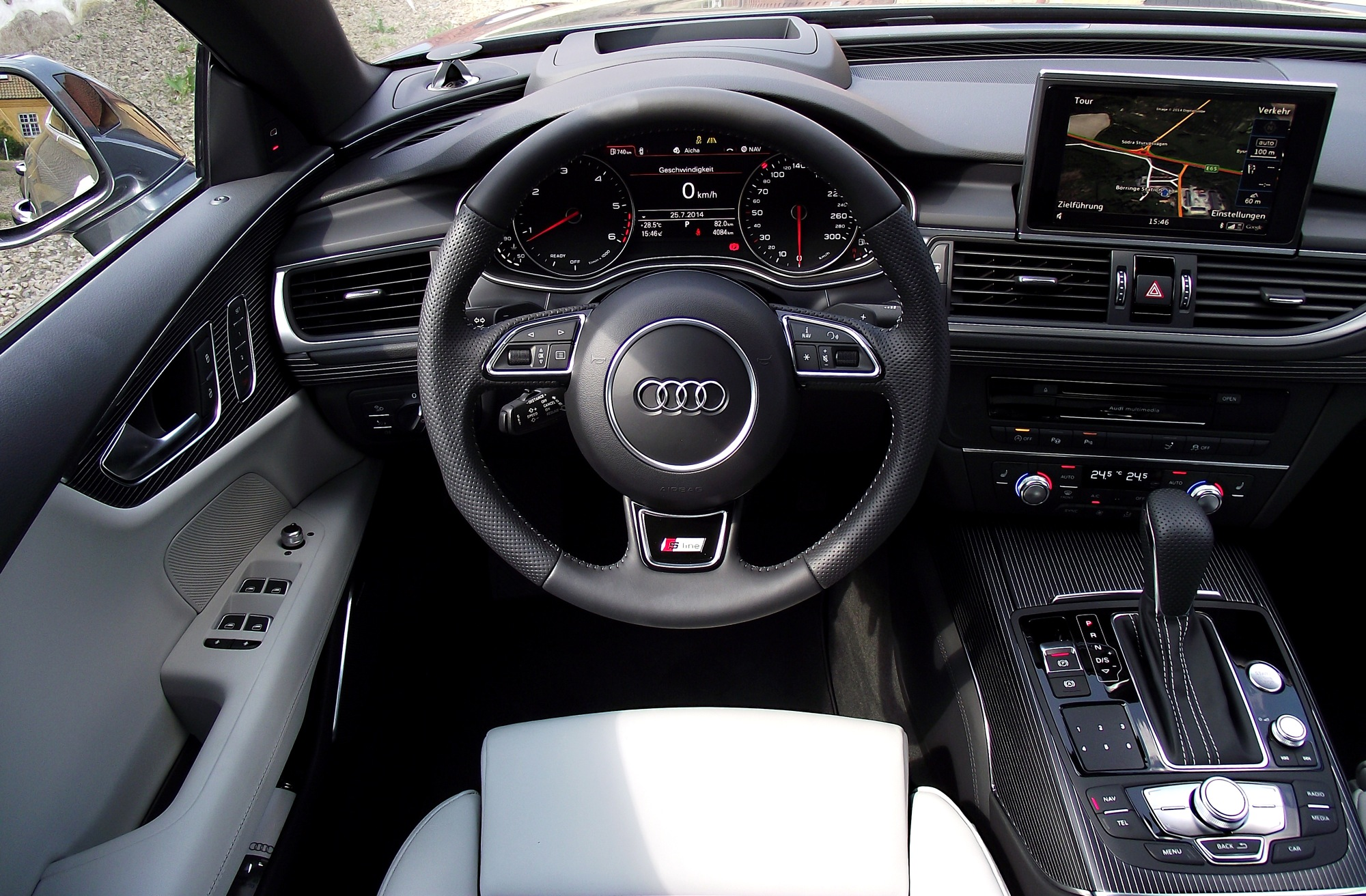
Interior (facelift)

== Second generation (Type 4K8; 2018) ==
Second generation
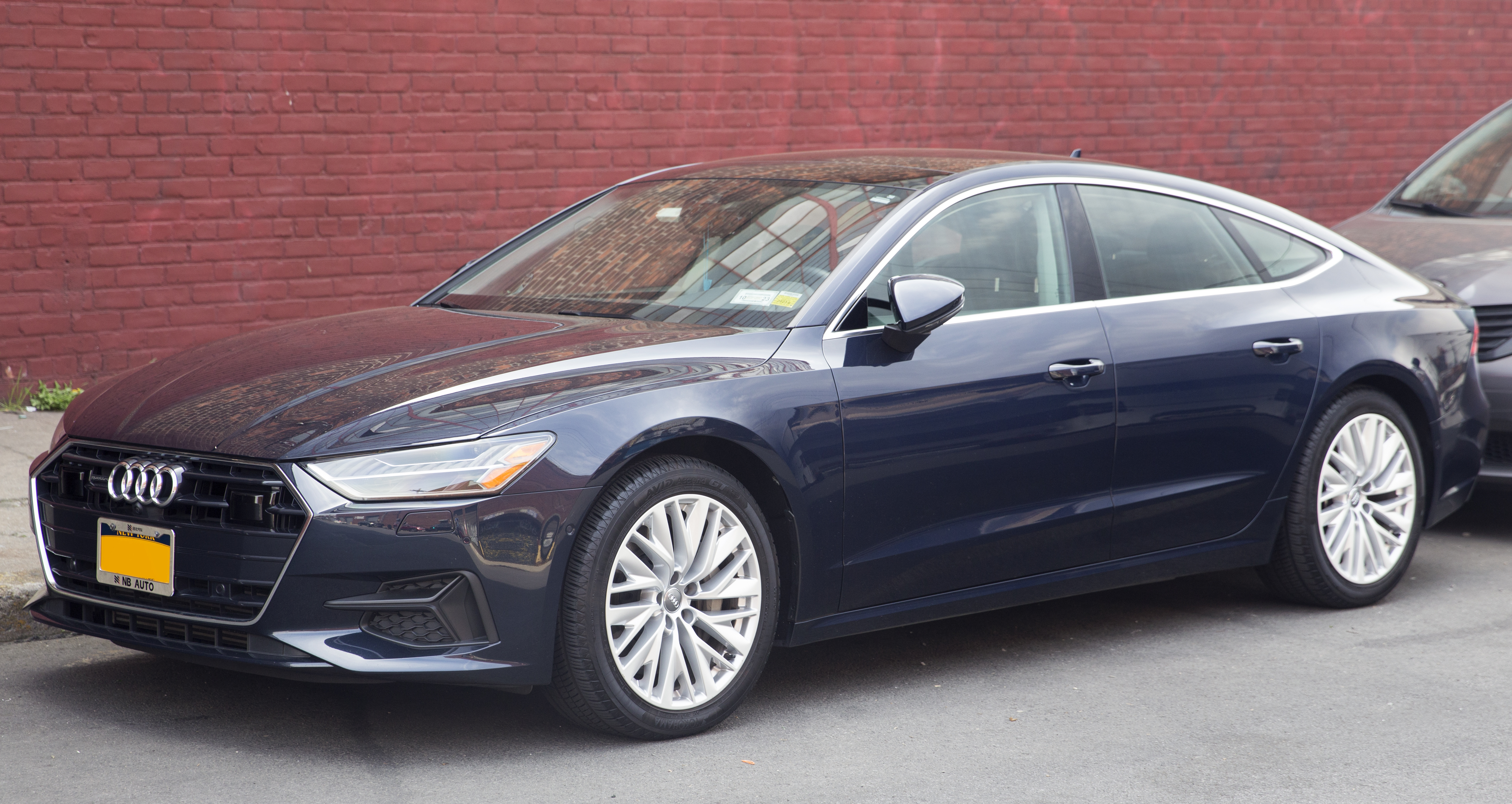

Overview
- Model code: 4K8
- Production: 2018–2025 (Global); 2021–present (China; A7L)
- Model years: 2019–2025
- Assembly: Germany: Neckarsulm; China: Anting (SAIC-VW, A7L)
- Designer: Sebastiano Russo

Body and chassis
- Body style: 5-door liftback 4-door sedan (A7L, China)
- Platform: Volkswagen MLBevo platform
- Related: Audi A8; Audi A6; Audi Q7; Audi Q8; Bentley Bentayga; Lamborghini Urus; Porsche Cayenne; Volkswagen Touareg

Powertrain
- Engine: Petrol: 2.0 L turbo FSI I4 (45 TFSI); 3.0 L turbo FSI V6 (55 TFSI); 3.0 L turbo MHEV FSI V6; 2.9 L twin-turbo FSI V6 (S7); 4.0 L twin-turbo FSI V8 (RS 7); Diesel: 2.0 L TDI I4 (40 TDI); 3.0 L TDI V6 (50 TDI); PHEV: 2.0 L turbo FSI I4 (55 TFSIe)
- Electric motor: AC synchronous electric motor (55 TFSIe)
- Transmission: 7-speed dual clutch S tronic; 8-speed automatic tiptronic
- Hybrid drivetrain: Mild hybrid (55 TFSI / S7 TFSI / RS 7 TFSI); Plug-in hybrid (50 TFSI e / 55 TFSI e)

Dimensions
- Wheelbase: 2,926 mm (115.2 in); 3,024 mm (119.1 in) (A7L)
- Length: 4,969 mm (195.6 in); 5,095 mm (200.6 in) (A7L)
- Width: 1,926 mm (75.8 in)
- Height: 1,422 mm (56.0 in)
- Curb weight: 1,890 kg (4,170 lb)

The second generation A7 was revealed in October 2017, officially launching in Germany in February 2018, and has been on sale in Europe since late 2017. It made its North American debut at the North American International Auto Show in Detroit on 12 January 2018. Production started in February 2018 at Audi's Neckarsulm plant.

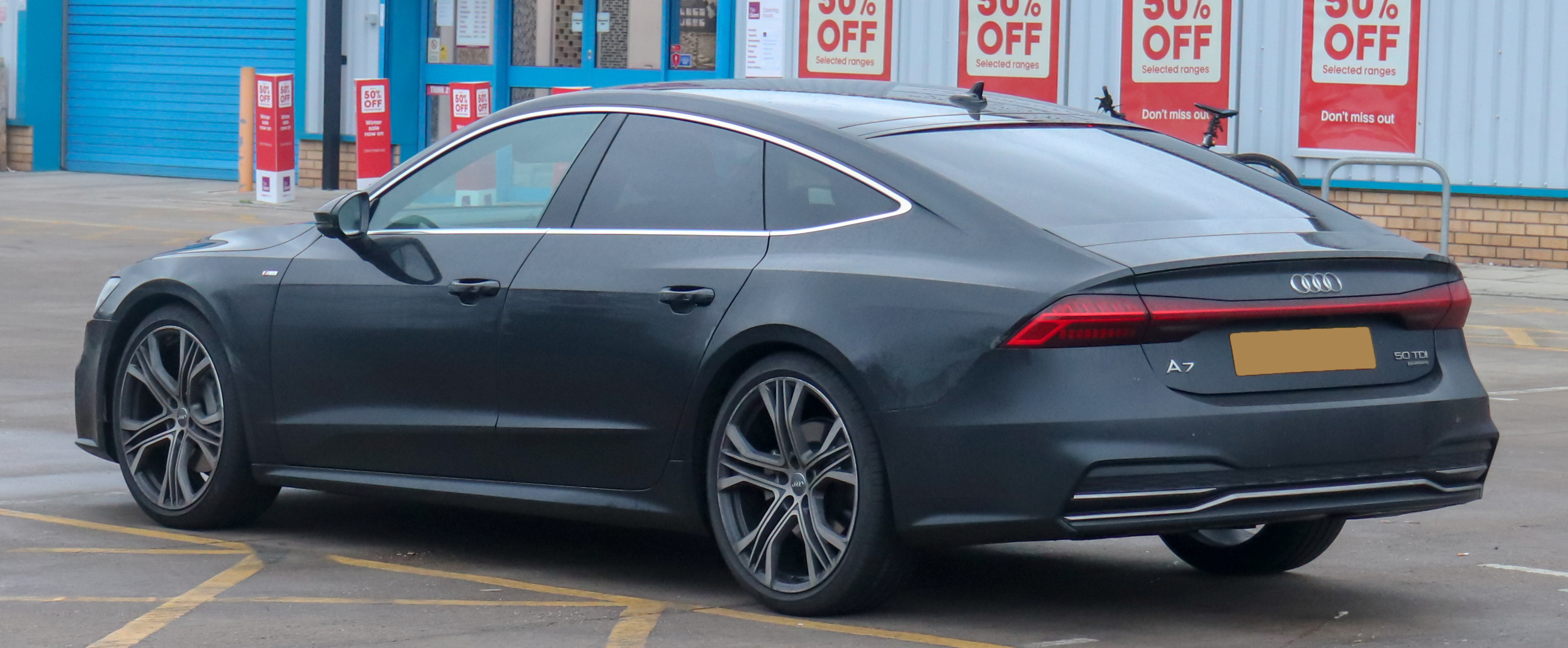
Rear view

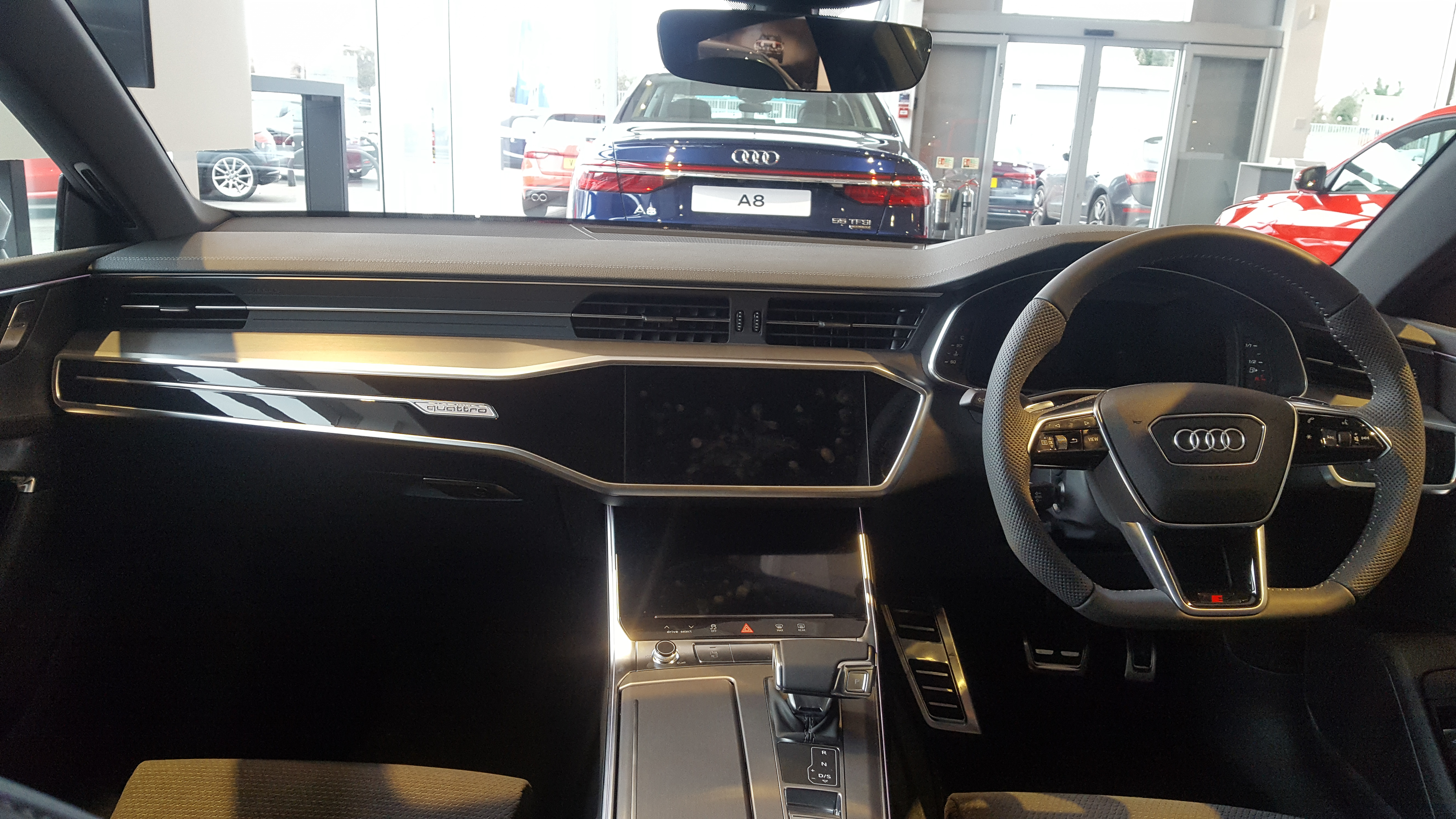
Interior

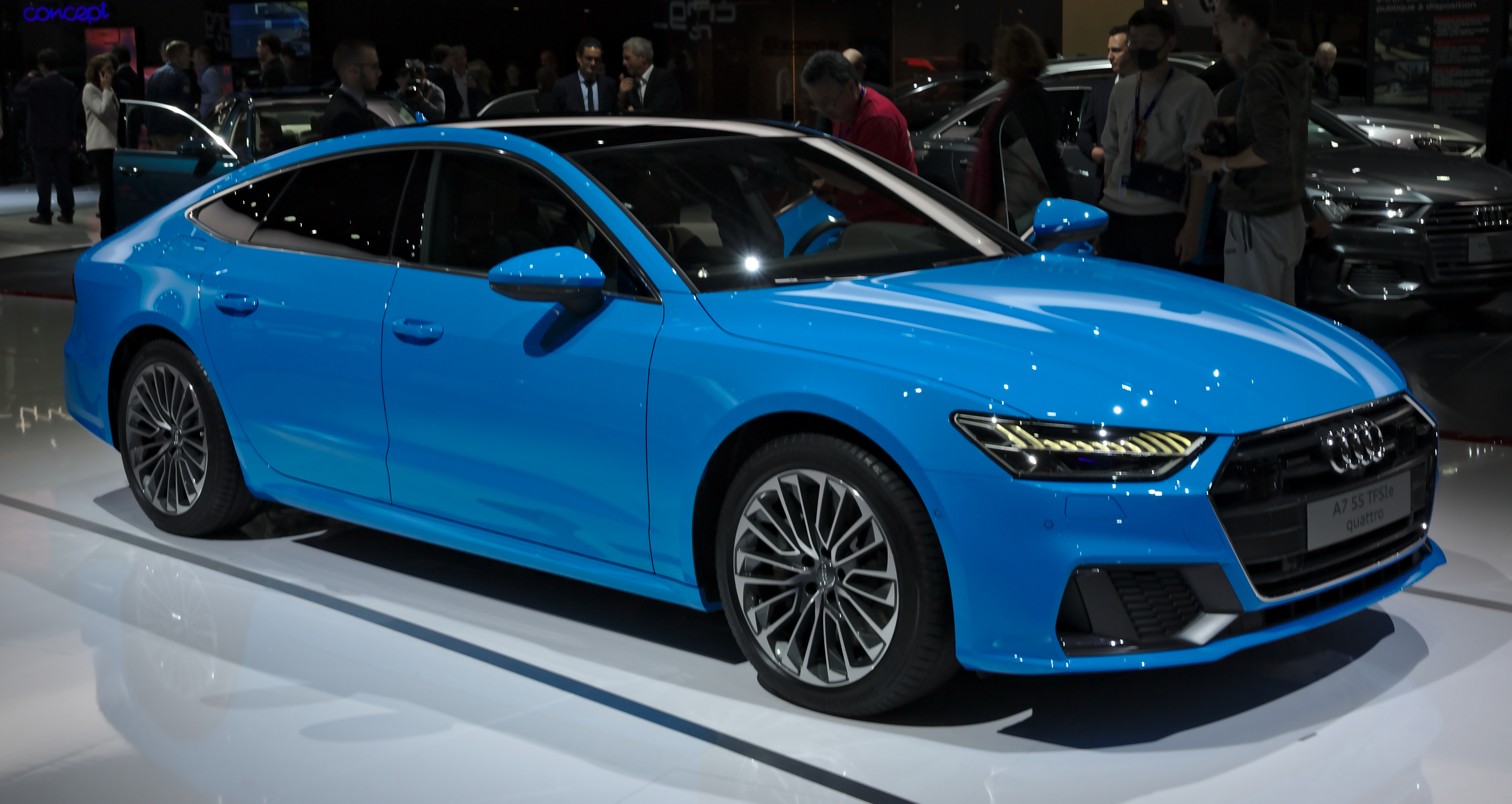
Audi A7 55 TFSIe Quattro

=== RS 7 ===
The RS 7 Sportback was first unveiled at the 2019 Frankfurt Motor Show.

Specifications

- Engine: twin-turbocharged and intercooled DOHC 32-valve V-8, aluminium block and heads, direct fuel injection.
- Displacement: 3,996 cc (243.9 cu in)
- Power: 441 kW (600 PS; 591 hp) at 6250 rpm
- Torque: 800 N⋅m (590 lb⋅ft) at 2050 rpm
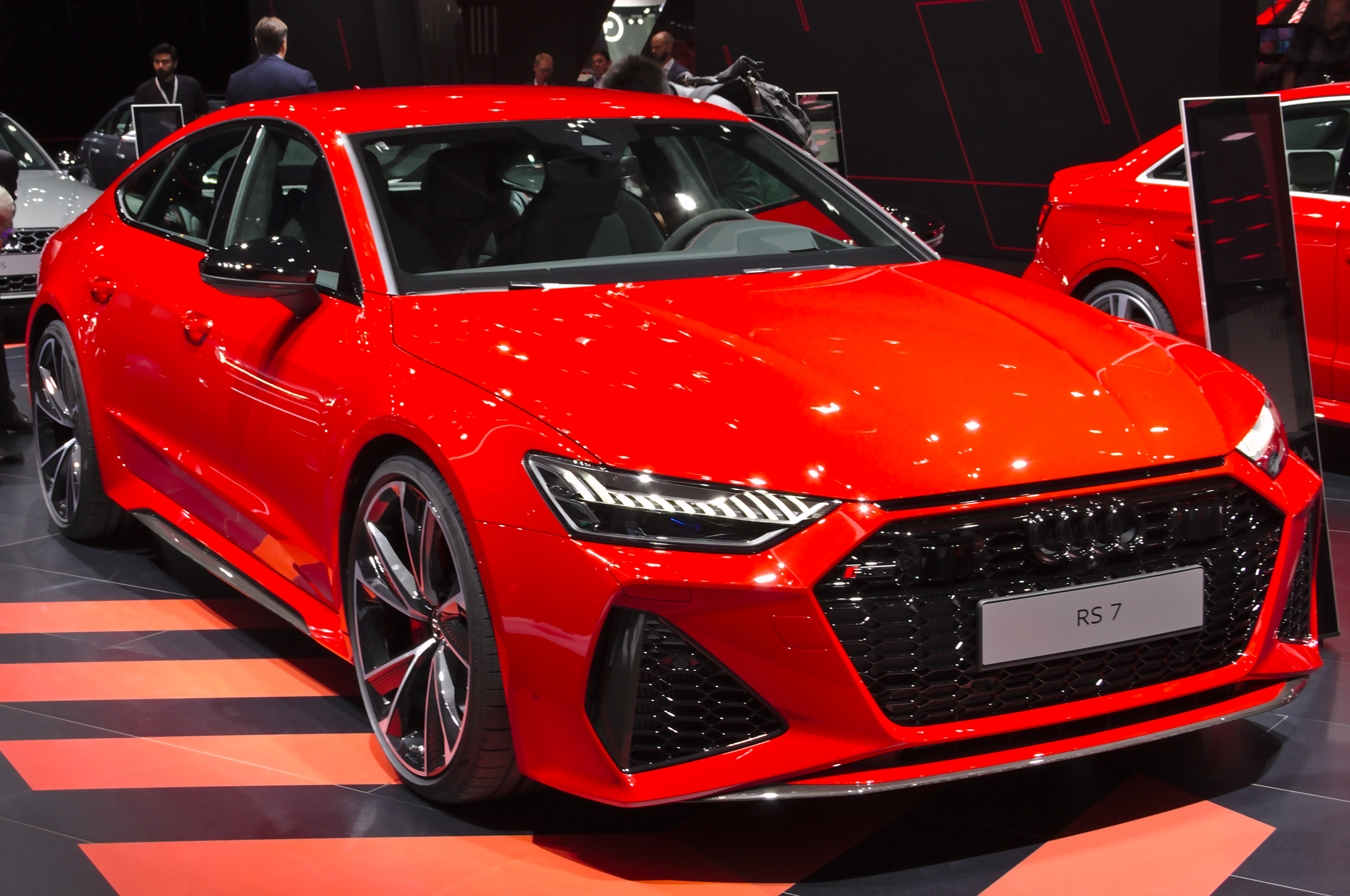
Audi RS 7

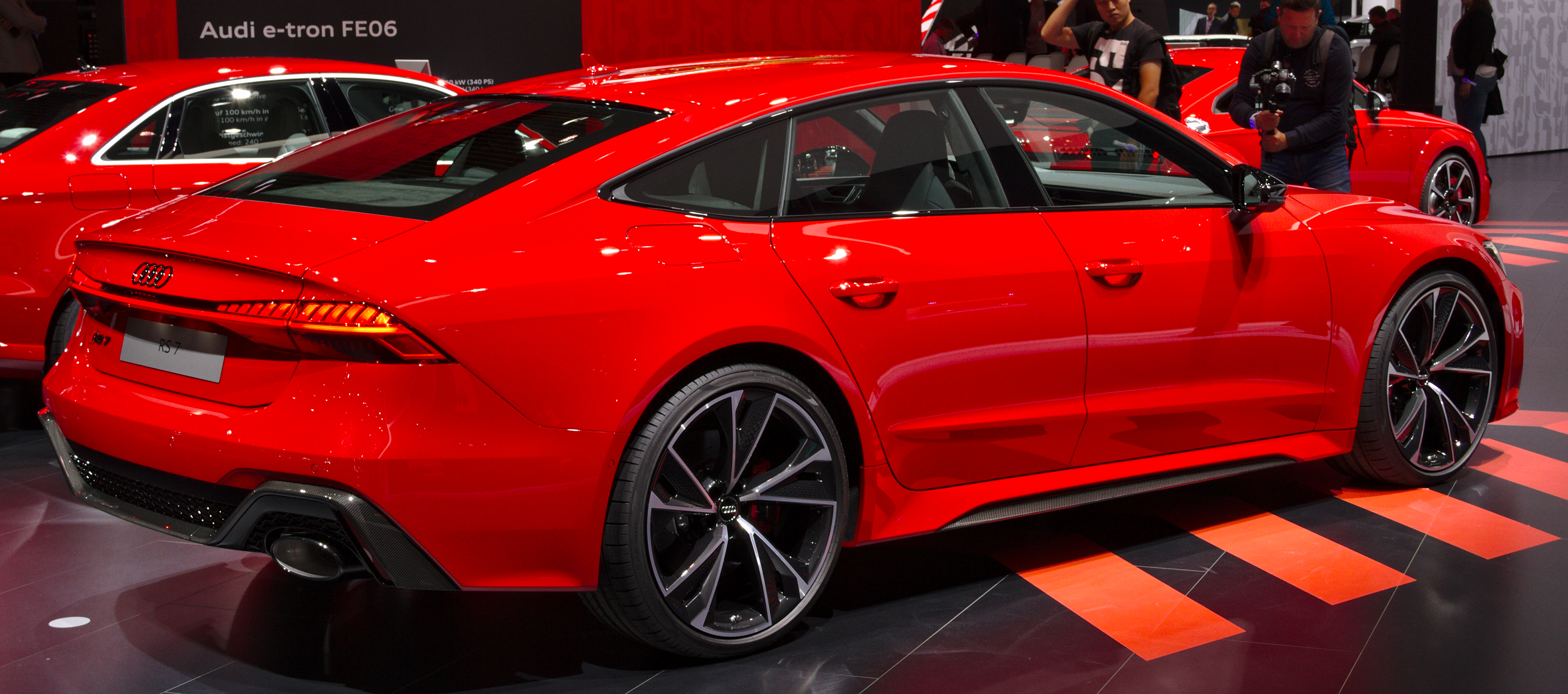
Rear

=== A7L ===
In April 2021, Audi launched the three-box sedan version of the A7, called the A7L. It is only sold in China as the first Audi model manufactured by the SAIC Volkswagen joint venture. The A7L has a slightly longer wheelbase while being shorter overall than the Audi A8 (non-LWB); the A7L also has frameless doors like the liftback A7 compared to the A8's framed doors. The A7L could be seen as a closer competitor to the BMW 8 Series Gran Coupé than the standard A7.

The engines are the same as those used in the liftback version, including the top-of-the-line 3.0-litre TFSI engine with 340 PS (250 kW; 335 hp) and 500 N⋅m (369 lbf⋅ft) of torque.

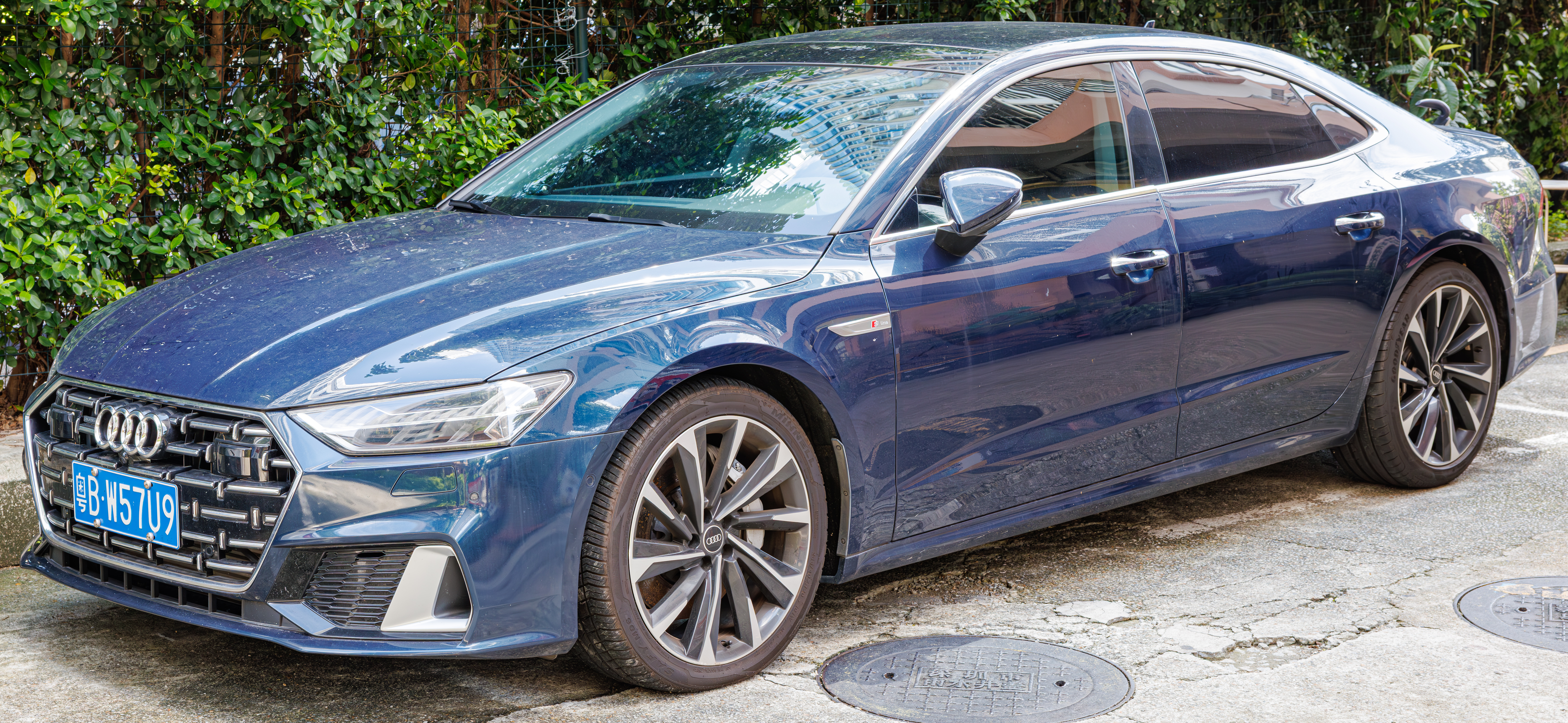
Audi A7L

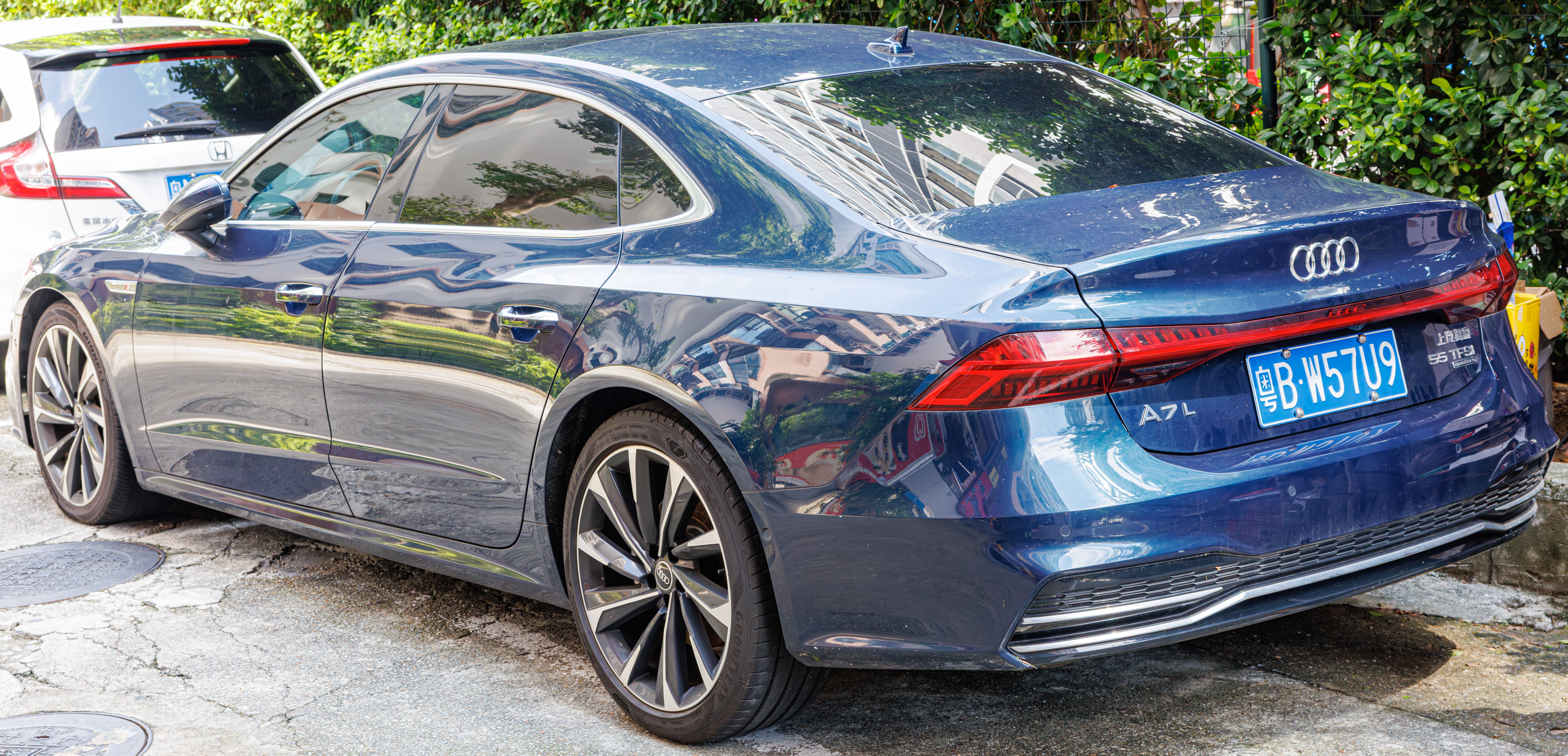
Rear

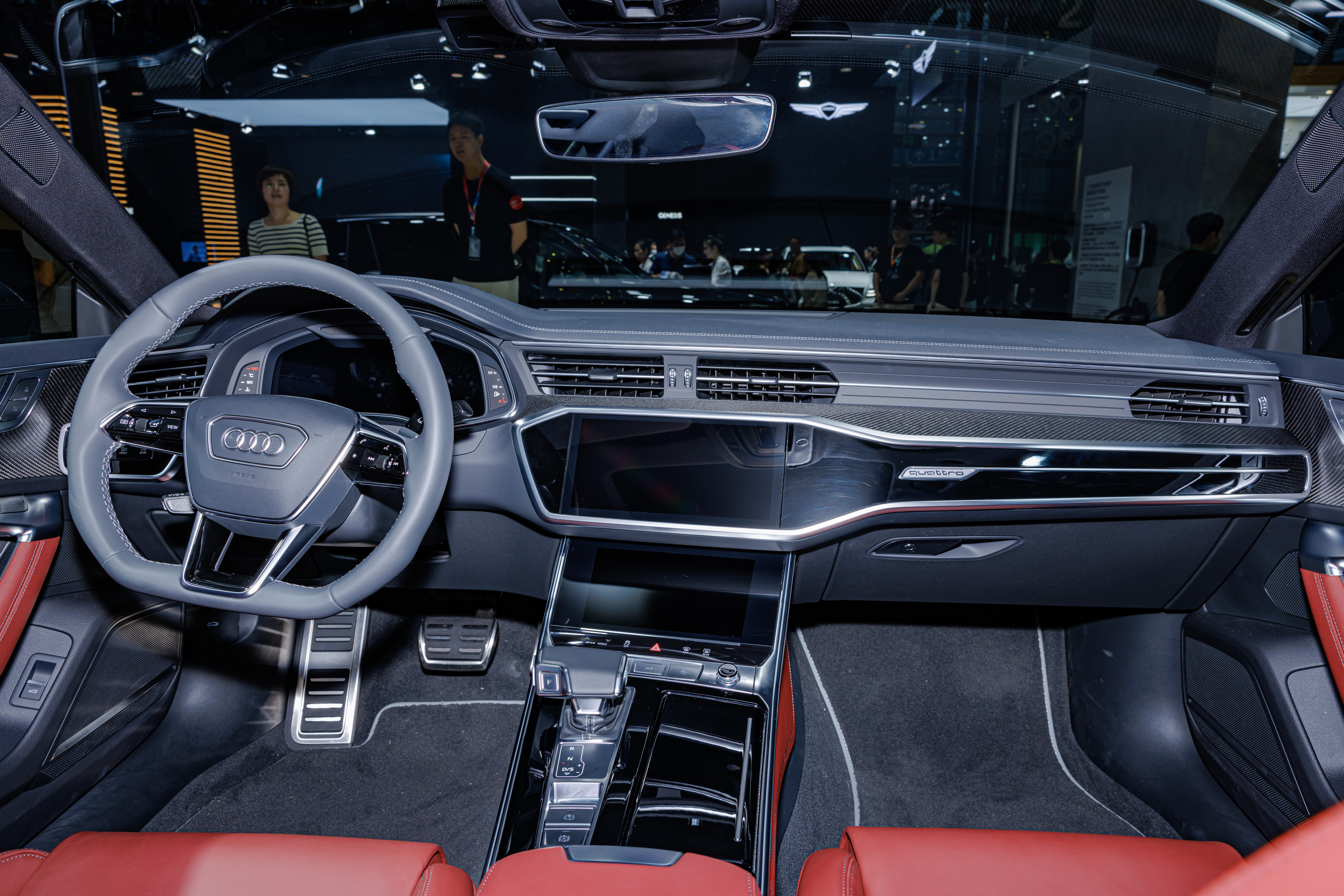
Interior

=== Engine ===
At launch, the A7 was powered by a six-cylinder petrol engine making 250 kW (340 PS; 335 hp) and 500 N⋅m (369 lbf⋅ft), an engine also used in the new Audi A8. Further engines became available soon after the start of production. All units receive a 48-volt vehicle electrical system, which together with the belt alternator starter (BAS) comprises the mild hybrid system.

=== Safety ===
ANCAP test results Audi A7 all variants excluding RS7 (2018, aligned with Euro NCAP)
Test	Points	%
Overall:	5 /5 stars	
Adult occupant:	35.5	93%
Child occupant:	41.7	85%
Pedestrian:	38.9	81%
Safety assist:	10.1	78%

=== Asia ===
The second generation A7 Sportback was launched in China in December 2018. In April 2021, an additional extended wheelbase three box sedan variant, called the A7L, was launched in China. The A7L is manufactured by SAIC-Volkswagen as one of the first Audi products to be produced by SAIC. The A7 Sportback MK2 Type C8/4K was launched in Pakistan in 2019, one year after its launch in India. As of 2017, the second generation of the Audi A7 was also the first generation of the A7 to be sold in Bangladesh. In September 2018, the second generation of A7 was sold in Oman. It was introduced to the Vietnamese market in October 2018 and to the Thai market in February 2019.

Petrol engines
Model	Years	Type	Power, torque at rpm	0–100 km/h (0–62 mph)	Top speed
A7 2.0 TFSI ultra (40 TFSI / 40 TFSI quattro)	2018-2025	1,995 cc (121.7 cu in) I4 turbo (VW EA888)	190 PS (140 kW; 187 bhp), 320 N⋅m (236 lb⋅ft) @ 1450-4200 rpm	7.2 sec	240 km/h (149 mph)
A7 2.0 TFSI (45 TFSI / 45 TFSI quattro)	2018-2025	1,995 cc (121.7 cu in) I4 turbo (VW EA888)	252 PS (185 kW; 249 bhp), 370 N⋅m (273 lb⋅ft) @ 1600-4500 rpm	5.8 sec	250 km/h (155 mph)
A7 55 TFSI/3.0 TFSI quattro	2018-2025	2,995 cc (182.8 cu in) V6 twin-scroll turbo (VW EA839 CZSE)	340 PS (250 kW; 335 bhp) at 5,000-6,000/6,400, 500 N⋅m (368.8 lb⋅ft) at 1,370-4,500	5.3s	250 km/h (155 mph)
A7 55 TFSI QUATTRO S-LINE	2019-2025	2,995 cc (182.8 cu in) V6 twin-scroll turbo + 48-volt MHEV system (VW EA839 CZSE)	340 PS (250 kW; 335 bhp) at 5,000–6,400, 500 N⋅m (369 lb⋅ft) at 1,370–4,500	5.3 seconds	250 km/h (155 mph)
S7 2.9 TFSI quattro	2019–2025	2,894 cc (177 cu in) V6 twin-turbo + 48-volt MHEV system	450 PS (331 kW; 444 bhp), 600 N⋅m (443 lb⋅ft)	4.5s	250 km/h (155 mph)
RS 7 Performance 4.0 TFSI quattro	2019–2025	3,996 cc (244 cu in) V8 twin-turbo + 48-volt MHEV system	630 PS (463 kW; 621 bhp), 850 N⋅m (627 lb⋅ft)	3.4s	306 km/h (190 mph) with Dynamic Plus Package

Plug-in-Hybrid engines
Model	Years	Type	Power, torque at rpm	0–100 km/h (0–62 mph)	Top speed
A7 55 TFSIe quattro	2021-2025	1,995 cc (121.7 cu in) I4 turbo (VW EA113 CDL) + Electric Motor	252 PS (185 kW; 249 bhp) at 5,000–6,000 rpm, 370 N⋅m (273 lb⋅ft) at 1,600–4,500 rpm (engine); 252 PS (185 kW; 249 bhp), 350 N⋅m (258 lb⋅ft) (motor); 367 PS (270 kW; 362 bhp), 500 N⋅m (369 lb⋅ft) (total system output)	5.4s	250 km/h (155 mph)

Diesel engines
Model	Years	Type	Power, torque at rpm	0–100 km/h (0–62 mph)	Top speed
A7 40 TDI/2.0 TDI	2019–2025	1,968 cc (120.1 cu in) I4	204 PS (150 kW; 201 bhp) at 3,750–4,200 400 N⋅m (295.0 lb⋅ft) at 1,750-3,000	8.3s	245 km/h (152 mph)
A7 45 TDI/3.0 TDI quattro	2019–2025	2,967 cc (181.1 cu in) V6 turbo	231 PS (170 kW; 228 bhp) at 3,250-4,750, 500 N⋅m (368.8 lb⋅ft) at 1,750-3,250	6.5s	250 km/h (155 mph)
A7 50 TDI/3.0 TDI quattro	2018–2025	2,967 cc (181.1 cu in) V6 turbo	286 PS (210 kW; 282 bhp) at 3,750-4,000, 600 N⋅m (442.5 lb⋅ft) at 2,250-3,250	5.7s	250 km/h (155 mph)
S7 3.0 TDI quattro	2019–2025	2,967 cc (181 cu in) V6 turbo + 48-volt MHEV system	349 PS (257 kW; 344 bhp) at 3850, 700 N⋅m (516.3 lb⋅ft) at 2500	5.1s	250 km/h (155 mph)

== Production and sales ==
Production
Year	Total
2010	8,496
2011	37,301
2012	28,950
2013	30,799
2014	27,709
2015	29,158
2016	26,308
2017	16,968
2018	20,058
2019	17,068
2020	18,083
2021	16,533
2022	17,437
2023	34,622

Sales
Year	China					US
Year	A7	A7L	S7	RS7	Total	US
2023	4,087	14,953	53	56	19,149	1,810
2024	3,733	30,432	20	85	34,270	1,574
2025	1,580	17,181	19	110	18,890	1,654

== See also ==
- Audi A7 sportback h-tron
