= Audi Sportback concept =

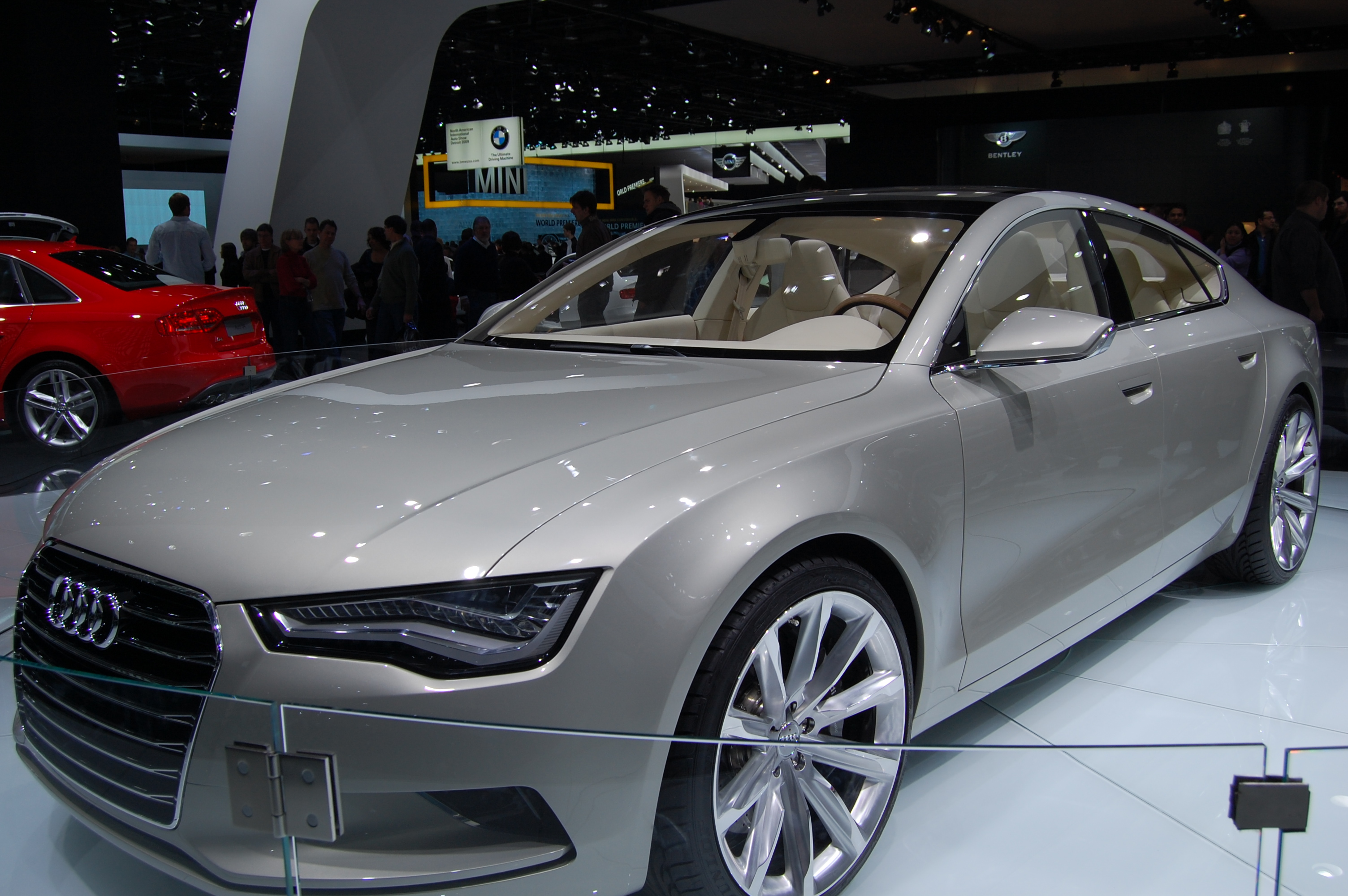

Overview
- Manufacturer: Audi AG
- Production: 2009

Body and chassis
- Class: Concept car
- Body style: 5-door fastback
- Layout: Front engine, quattro four-wheel drive
- Related: Audi A7

Powertrain
- Engine: 3.0 L TDI V6
- Transmission: 8-speed Tiptronic

Dimensions
- Length: 4,950 mm (194.9 in)
- Width: 1,930 mm (76.0 in)
- Height: 1,400 mm (55.1 in)
- Curb weight: 1,800 kg (3,968.3 lb)

The Audi Sportback concept is a concept car produced by Audi, shown at the 2009 North American International Auto Show. The Sportback concept, a luxury five-door fastback model, was regarded as a preview of two future models: the Audi A5 Sportback variant and the Audi A7. The Audi A5 Sportback later debuted in July 2009, followed by the launch of the A7 Sportback at the Pinakothek der Moderne art museum in Munich in July 2010.
