= Volkswagen Group B-VX62 platform =

The Volkswagen Group B-VX62 platform (sometimes called the VX62 platform) is an automobile platform shared among various marques of multi-purpose vehicles (MPVs) in the European market from the Volkswagen Group and Ford.

It was co-developed by Volkswagen AG and Ford Europe, and used by Volkswagen Group for its Volkswagen Passenger Cars and SEAT car marques. All B-VX62-based vehicles were built at the joint venture plant AutoEuropa in Portugal.

== B-VX62 platform vehicles ==
- Volkswagen Sharan (Typ 7M, 1995–2010)
- SEAT Alhambra (Typ 7M, 1996–2010)
- Ford Galaxy (1995–2006)
