= Volkswagen Sharan =

Mid-size MPV produced by Volkswagen (1995–2022)

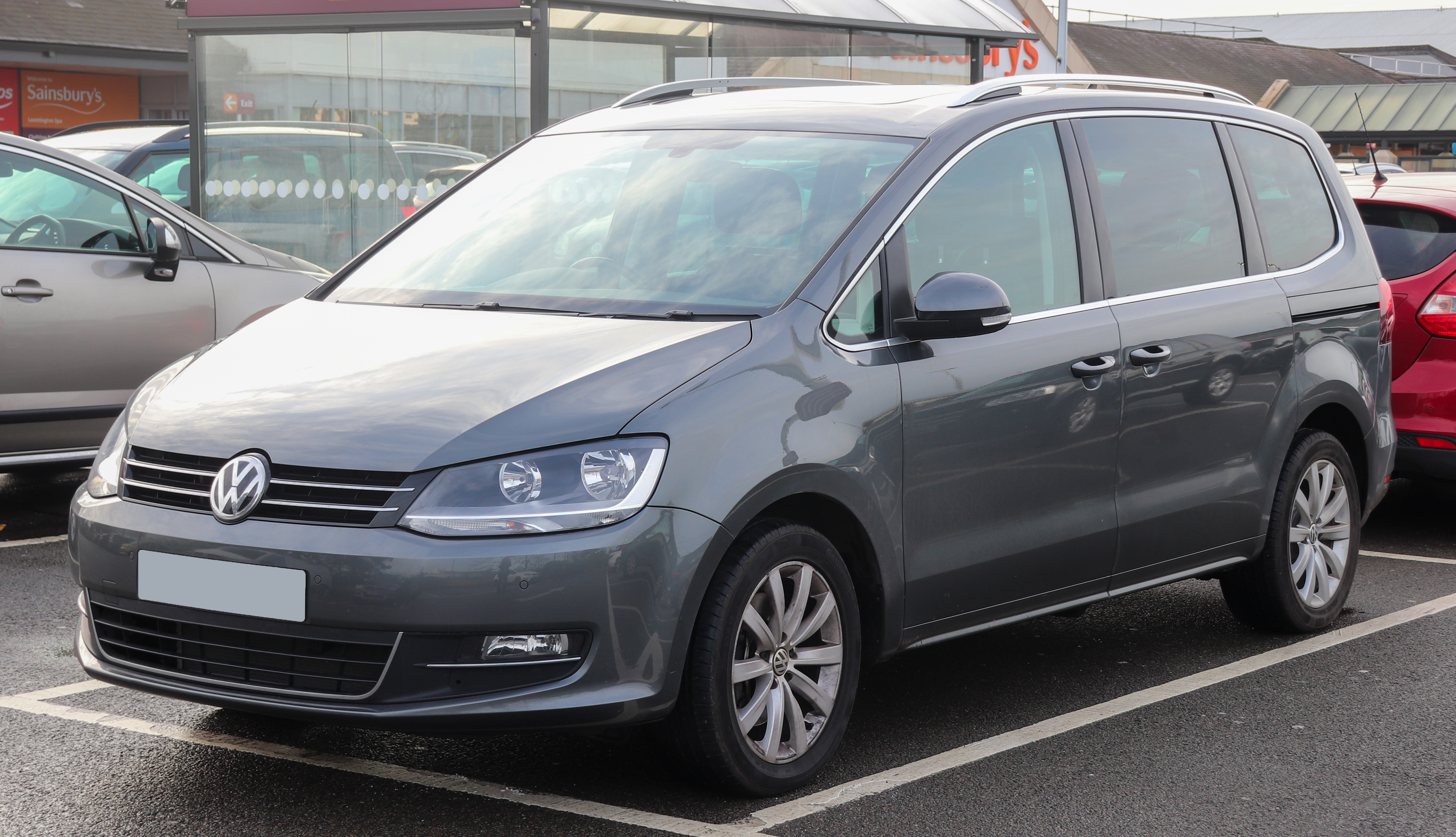

Overview
- Manufacturer: Volkswagen
- Production: 1995–2022
- Assembly: Portugal: Palmela (Autoeuropa)

Body and chassis
- Class: Mid-size MPV (M)
- Body style: 5-door MPV
- Layout: Front-engine, front-wheel-drive

Chronology
- Successor: Volkswagen Viloran; Volkswagen ID. Buzz; Volkswagen Multivan (T7)

The Volkswagen Sharan is a seven-seater minivan that was produced by the German Volkswagen Group. It was built at the AutoEuropa plant in Palmela, Portugal across two generations from 1995 to 2022. Through badge engineering, the Volkswagen Sharan shares the same platform with the SEAT Alhambra, and the first generation was also in most respects identical to the Ford Galaxy. A second generation was produced from 2010 to 2022. It has a front-engine, front-wheel-drive layout and is described in the motor industry as a multi-purpose vehicle (MPV).

== First generation (Typ 7M; 1995) ==
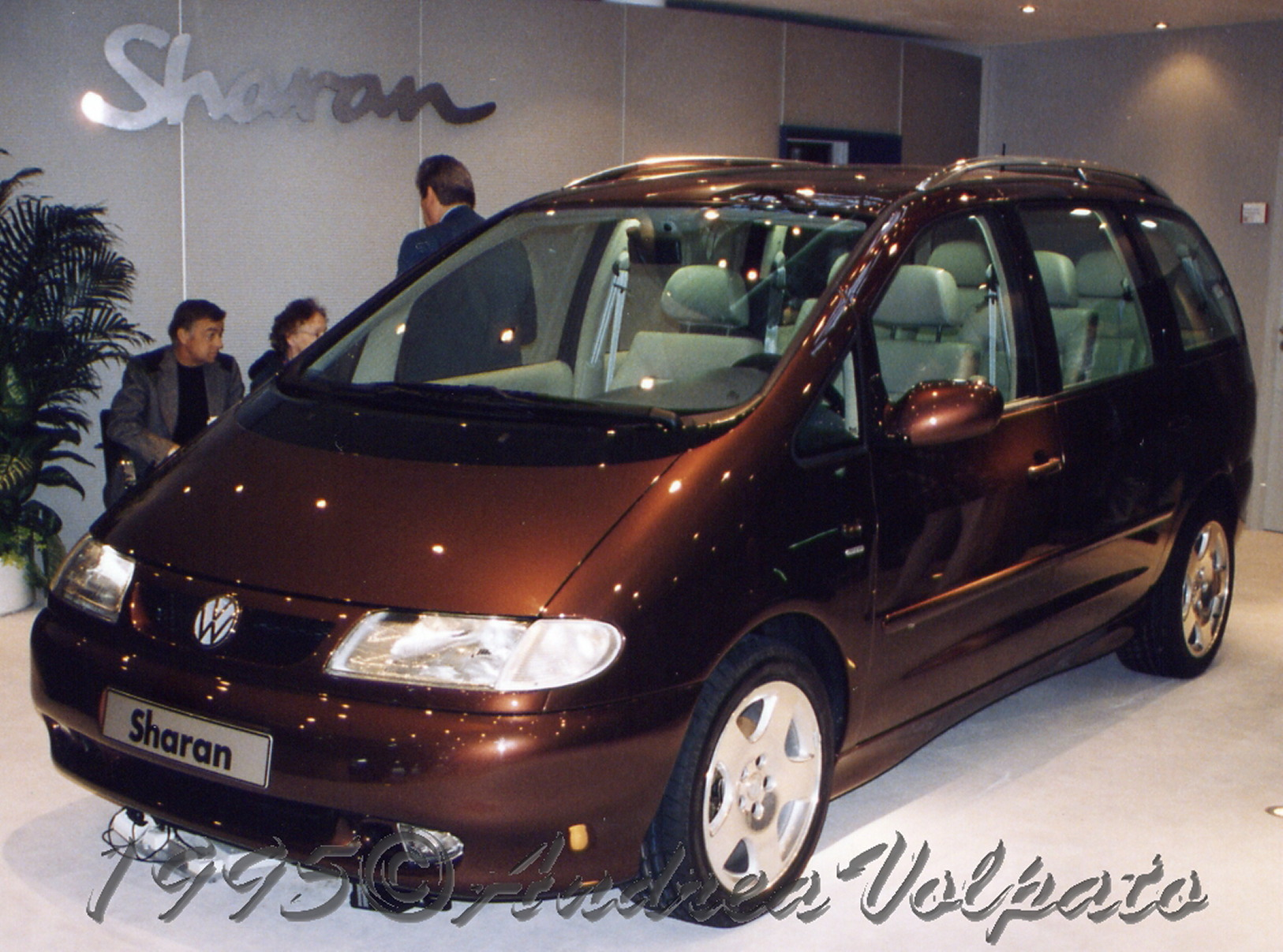
Volkswagen Sharan at the Geneva Motor Show of March 1995

First generation
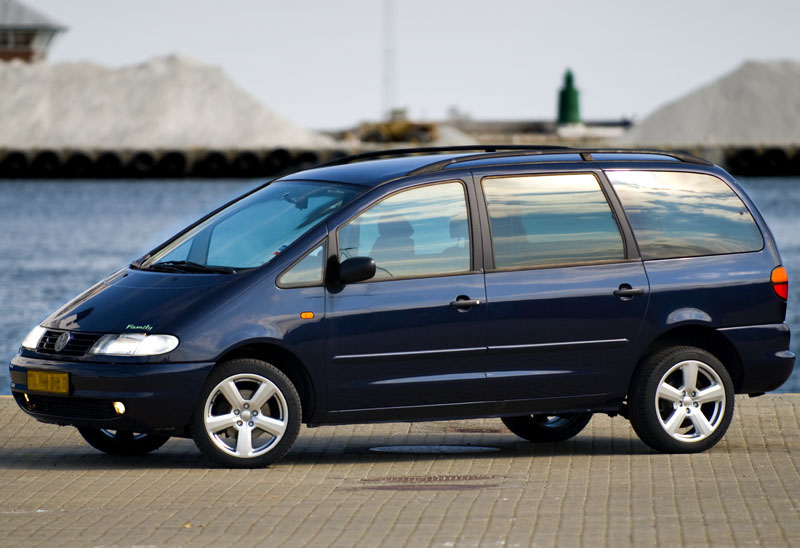

Overview
- Model code: 7M
- Also called: Ford Galaxy (until 2006); SEAT Alhambra
- Production: 1995–2010
- Assembly: Portugal: Palmela (AutoEuropa)
- Designer: Greg M Greeson (1990)

Body and chassis
- Platform: Volkswagen Group B-VX62

Powertrain
- Engine: Petrol: 1.8L I4 110 kW (148 hp) 20V Turbo; 2.0L I4 85 kW (114 hp); 2.8L VR6 128 kW (172 hp); 2.8L VR6 150 kW (201 hp) 24V; Diesel: 1.9L I4 66 kW (89 hp) TDI; 1.9L I4 81 kW (109 hp) TDI; 1.9L I4 85 kW (114 hp) TDI; 1.9L I4 96 kW (129 hp) TDI; 1.9L I4 110 kW (148 hp) TDI; 2.0L I4 103 kW (138 hp) TDI
- Transmission: 5-speed manual; 6-speed manual; 5-speed Tiptronic automatic

Dimensions
- Wheelbase: Pre-Facelift & 2010–: 2,835 mm (111.6 in); 2004–09: 2,841 mm (111.9 in)
- Length: Pre-Facelift: 4,620 mm (181.9 in); Facelifted: 4,634 mm (182.4 in)
- Width: Pre-Facelift: 1,810 mm (71.3 in); Facelifted: 1,810 mm (71.3 in)
- Height: Pre-Facelift: 1,762 mm (69.4 in); 2004–09: 1,759 mm (69.3 in); 2010–: 1,732 mm (68.2 in)

The Sharan was the Volkswagen-badged product from a joint venture between Volkswagen and Ford Motor Company to produce vehicles in the increasingly important MPV market, which was filled at the time by Renault's Espace and Chrysler's Voyager. The resulting Volkswagen Sharan concept (and Ford Galaxy) was shown at the 1994 Paris Auto Show, and production started in May 1995. The name Sharan was said to be derived from the Persian word 'Shahran' meaning "Carrier of Kings". However, according to Volkswagen, it is a made-up word, like 'Touran'.

Development began in top-secret in 1987, known only to the highest level members of the respective companies, with a team consisting of Ford's Steve Harper, Paul Coucill, and Volkswagen's Peter Knapp. Harper's design was chosen at the first review that September. It originally had a very different boxier design, and used a conventional minivan layout with a single sliding-door.

The Volkswagen Group subsequently rebadged the Sharan and sold it as the SEAT Alhambra alongside the Sharan. All variants were produced at the joint venture's plant AutoEuropa in Portugal, alongside the closely related Ford Galaxy. The Sharan was on sale from 1995 to 2010, accompanied with facelifts in 2000 and 2004.

As of 2007, the annual production for the Sharan is in the 50,000 unit range; it is sold in Europe, South Africa and some Asia Pacific and Latin American countries. In Mexico, it was available with the 1.8L Turbo 4 cil 150 hp (112 kW) with five speed Tiptronic automatic gearbox in Comfortline trim only, while in Argentina it is available with the 1.8L Turbo and the 1.9L TDI 115 hp four cylinder engines, in both five speed manual and five speed Tiptronic transmissions in Trendline trim only.

The cooperation between Volkswagen and Ford ended in 2006, with the latter going alone in building the second generation Galaxy.

The Sharan was not sold in the United States and Canada. Originally, this was due to an agreement between Ford and Volkswagen, leaving the market free from competition for Ford's Aerostar minivan. Volkswagen later decided not to introduce the Sharan in North America, ceased developing the Microbus concept, and instead introduced a badge-engineered variant of the Chrysler minivans as the Routan. This was launched in 2009, and replaced the Sharan in Mexico which was the only North American country where the Sharan was sold.

Scoring 200 points on the United Kingdom Reliability Index, the Sharan is considered very unreliable when compared to the average vehicle score of 100, while a very reliable vehicle scores 60 or below. The average age and repair cost of the tested Sharan was 5,3 years and covered 63,546 miles. It has been noted that, despite enjoying high popularity, the Sharan has consistently performed poorly in UK customer satisfaction surveys, including a last place 138th in a 2003 survey. Although quality problems existed in the original version, the Sharan quickly became the best selling MPV in Germany. It also sold better there than the technically identical SEAT Alhambra and Ford Galaxy despite costing up to 2500 euros more.

The first generation Volkswagen Sharan was on sale for over 15 years having been built almost unchanged during the time. By the time it was replaced in 2010 it was one of the longest running car models in Europe. Despite its age, nearly 24,000 Sharans were still being sold annually as of 2008. In total, Volkswagen sold almost 670,000 units of its Sharan.

=== Mark 1/Phase 1 (1995–2000) ===
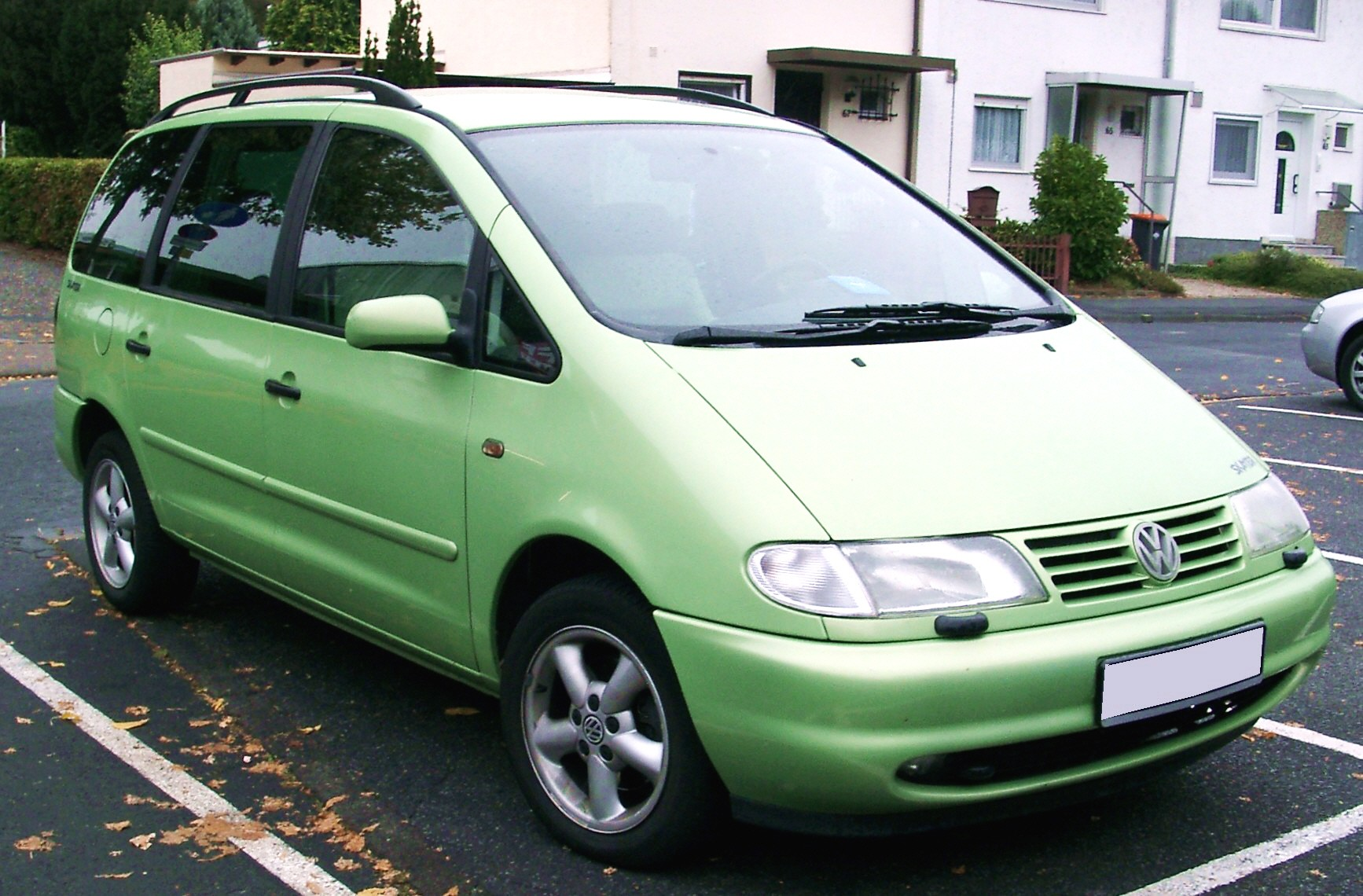
1995–2000 (Skater trim level)

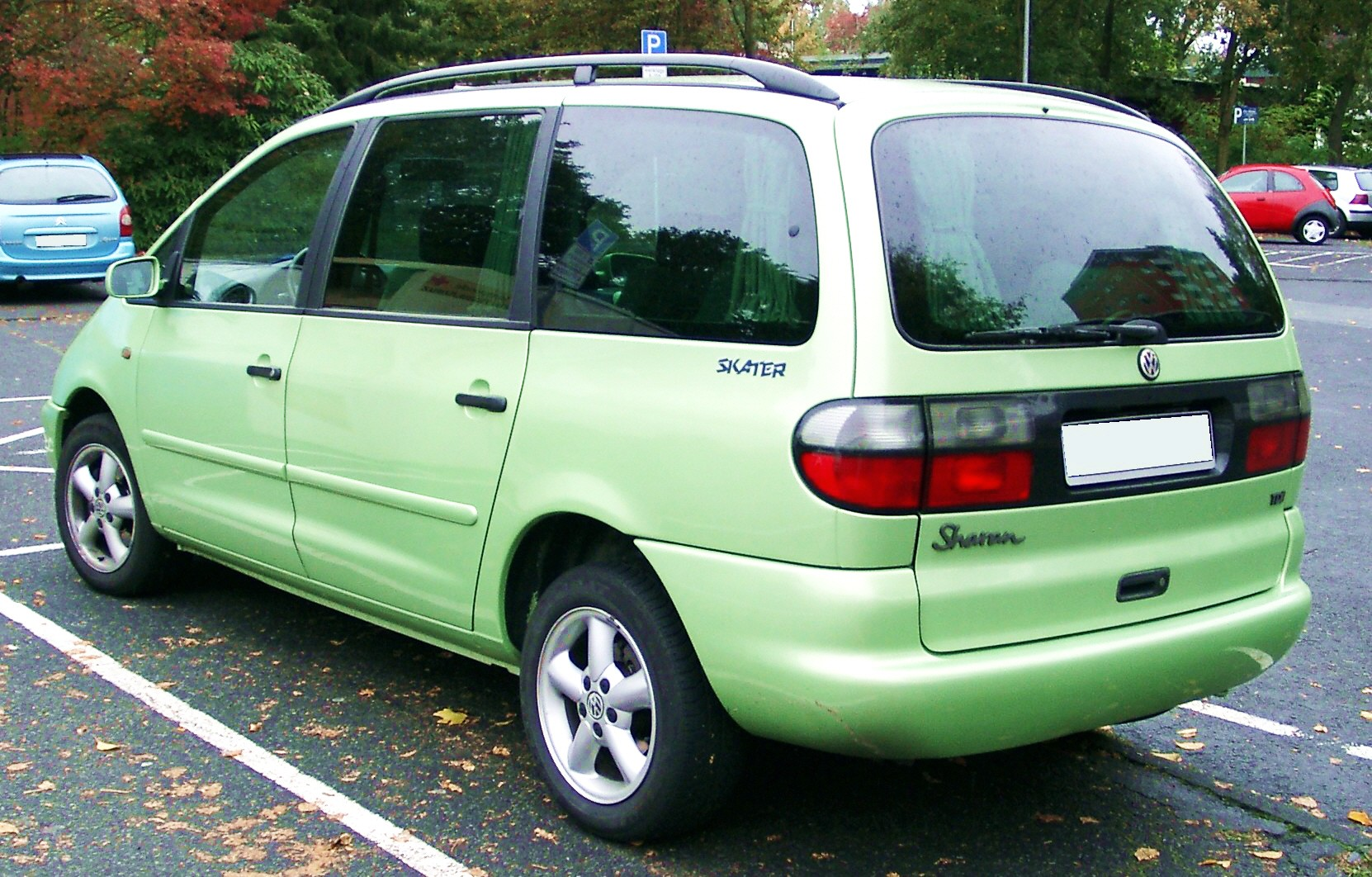
1995–2000 (Skater trim level)

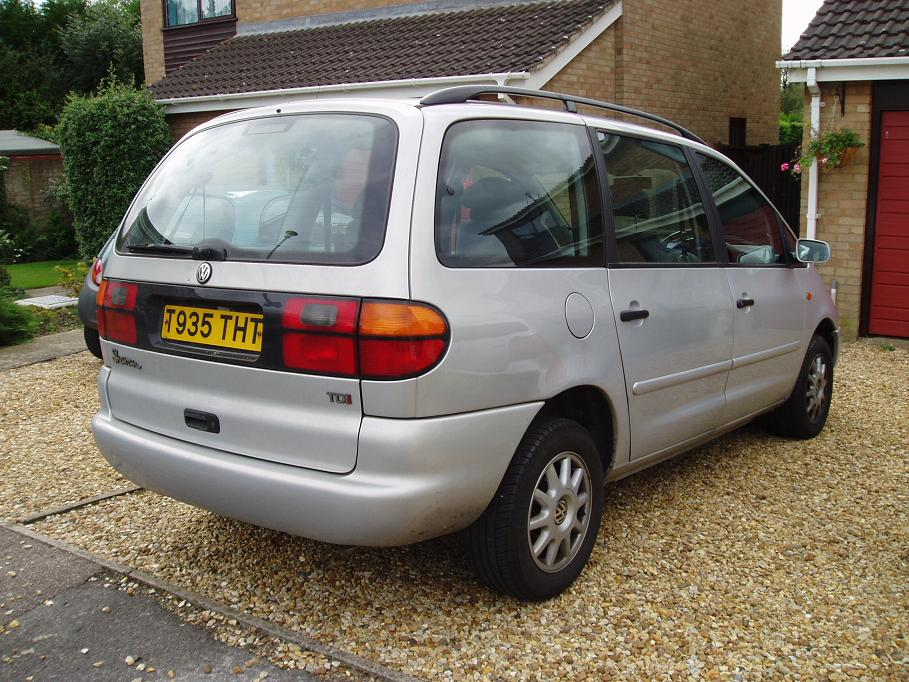
1995–2000 (Carat trim level)

The original Sharan was launched in August 1995, and was available with five engine choices:

Model	Years	Engine and code		Displ.	Power	Torque
1.8T	1997–2000	I4 20V	AJH	1781 cc	110 kW (150 PS; 148 hp) @ 6000 rpm	210 N⋅m (155 lb⋅ft) @ 1750–4600 rpm
2.0	1995–2000	I4 8V	ADY	1984 cc	85 kW (116 PS; 114 hp) @ 5000 rpm	170 N⋅m (125 lb⋅ft) @ 2400 rpm
2.8 VR6*	1995–2000	VR6 12V	AAA/AMY	2792 cc	128 kW (174 PS; 172 hp) @ 5800 rpm	235 N⋅m (173 lb⋅ft) @ 4200 rpm
1.9 TDI	1995–2000	I4 8V	1Z/AHU	1896 cc	66 kW (90 PS; 89 hp) @ 4000 rpm	202 N⋅m (149 lb⋅ft) @ 1900 rpm
1.9 TDI	1996–2000	I4 8V	AFN/AVG	1896 cc	81 kW (110 PS; 109 hp) @ 4150 rpm	235 N⋅m (173 lb⋅ft) @ 1900 rpm

*The 2.8 VR6 model had the option of Syncro all-wheel drive.

The design and technology of the Sharan (including Alhambra and Galaxy) was a mix between both Volkswagen and Ford. The design was a compromise solution, with the front looking similar to a Ford Mondeo Mk1 and the rear like Volkswagen Passat (B4). Each of the three MPV models had its own subtle differences in exterior, and, for the Galaxy, in interior design. The first generation's initial design was completed under Greg M Greeson, an American designer employed in Volkswagen's Advanced Design Studio in Düsseldorf, West Germany from 1989 to 1990.

Some small visual changes in 1998 included new door wings derived from the Volkswagen Golf Mk4 and some changes in the dashboard.

The Sharan received a Euro NCAP three star safety rating when it was tested in 1999.

Awards

- 1999 Auto Express New Car Honours – Best MPV
- 1998 Top Gear Magazine Top Cars – Best People Carrier (Joint Winner)
- 1996 What Car Awards – Best People Carrier (Joint Winner)
- 1996 Auto Express Awards – Best People Carrier (Joint Winner)

=== Mark 1A/Phase 1.5 (2000–2004) ===
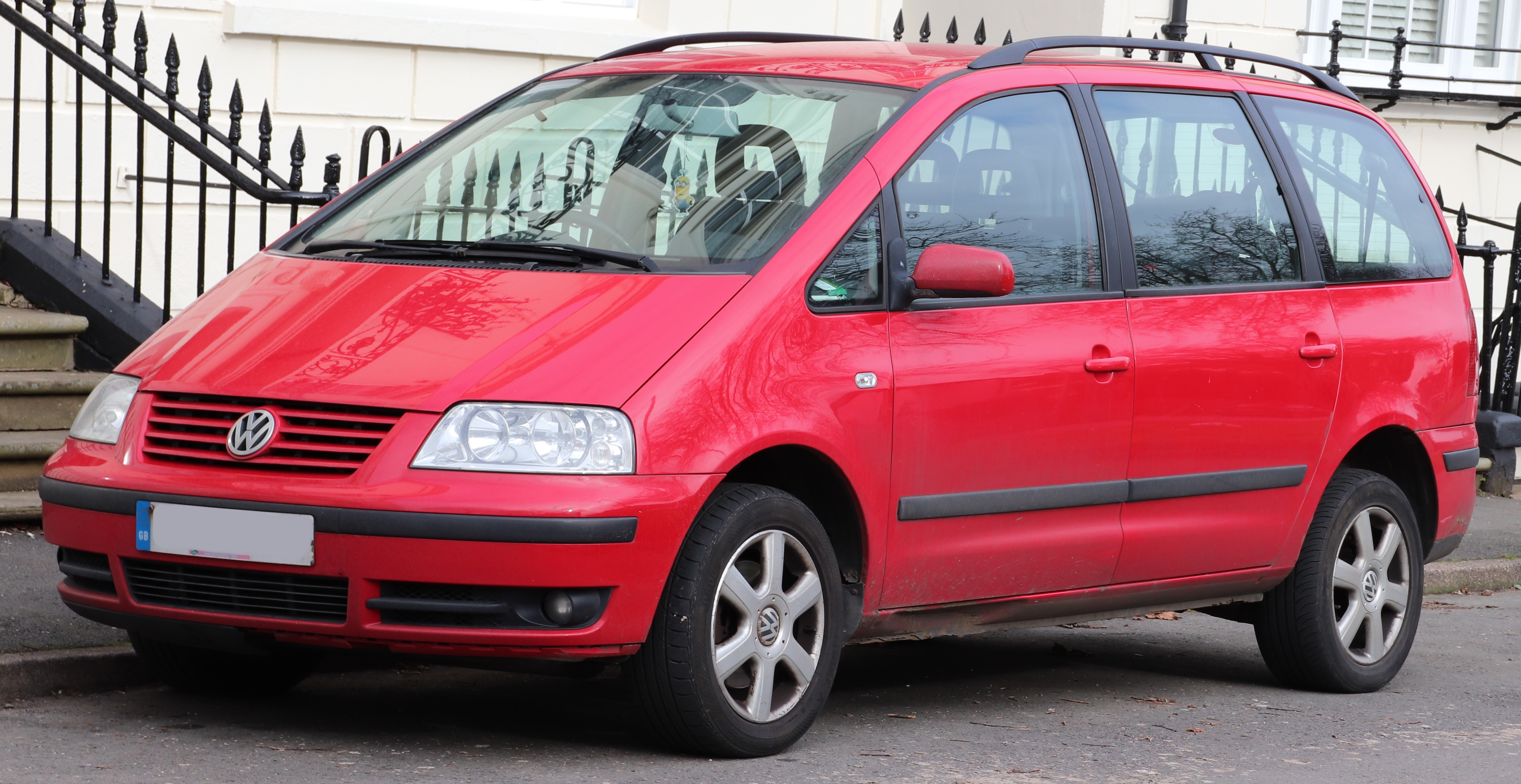
First facelift, 2000–2003 (Carat trim level)

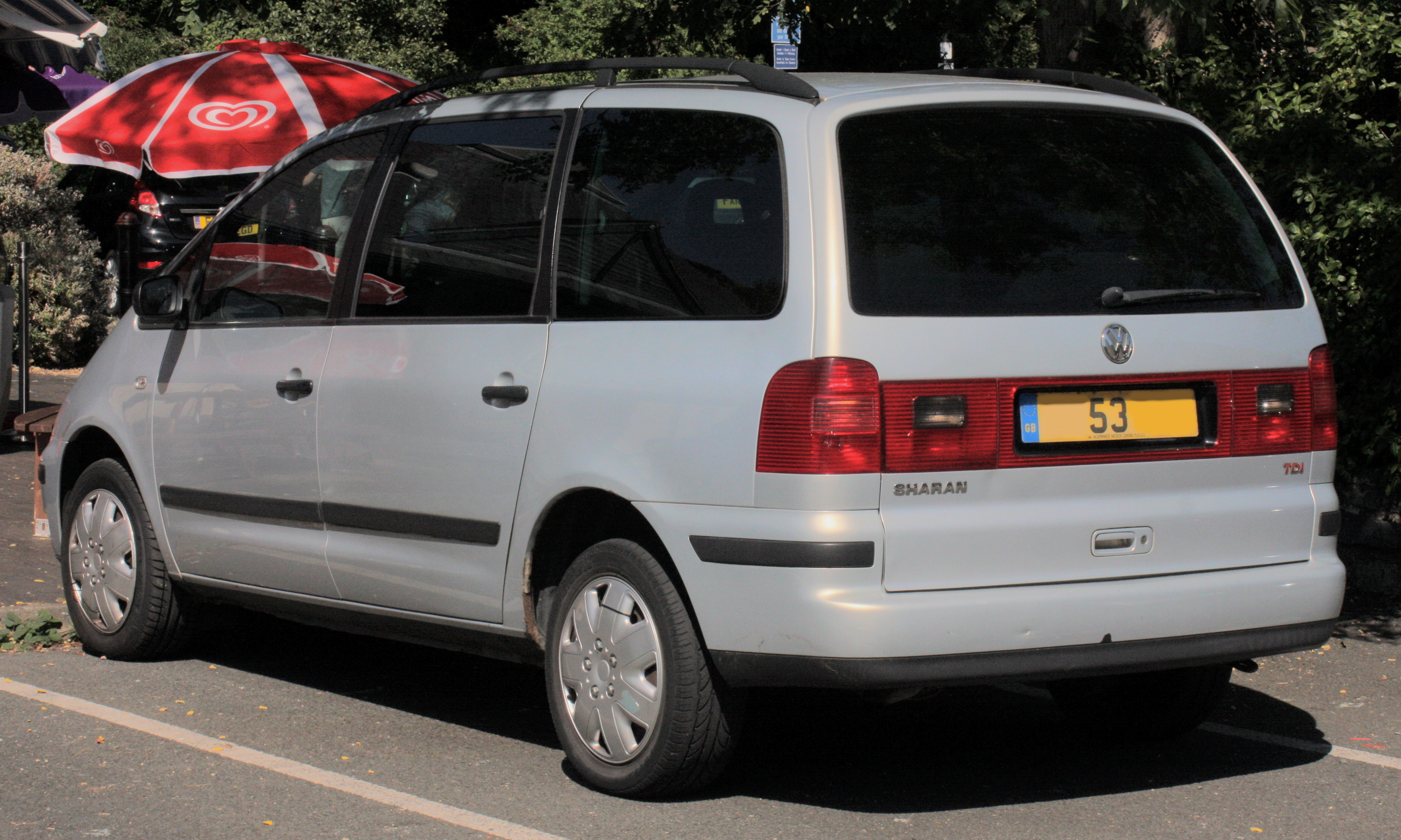
First facelift, 2000–2003 (Carat trim level)

The Sharan and its stablemates received a major facelift in May 2000. At this time, Volkswagen also extended the wheelbase by 6 mm (0.2 in), increased the front and rear track, and gave it the "Volkswagen family" look of the time including a brand new dashboard no longer sourced from Ford. Seven seats came as standard.

Awards

- 2000 Auto Express New Car Honours – Best MPV

==== Engines ====
Model	Years	Engine and code		Displ.	Power	Torque
1.8T	2000–2004	I4 20V	AWC	1781 cc	110 kW (150 PS; 148 hp) @ 5800 rpm	220 N⋅m (162 lb⋅ft) @ 1800 rpm
2.0	2000–2004	I4 8V	ATM	1984 cc	85 kW (116 PS; 114 hp) @ 5200 rpm	170 N⋅m (125 lb⋅ft) @ 2600 rpm
2.8 VR6	2000–2004	VR6 24V	AYL	2792 cc	150 kW (204 PS; 201 hp) @ 6200 rpm	265 N⋅m (195 lb⋅ft) @ 3400 rpm
1.9 TDI*	2000–2003	I4 8V	ANU	1896 cc	66 kW (90 PS; 89 hp) @ 4000 rpm	240 N⋅m (177 lb⋅ft) @ 1900 rpm
1.9 TDI	2000–2005	I4 8V	AUY	1896 cc	85 kW (116 PS; 114 hp) @ 4000 rpm	310 N⋅m (229 lb⋅ft) @ 1900 rpm
1.9 TDI	2003–2007	I4 8V	ASZ	1896 cc	96 kW (131 PS; 129 hp) @ 4000 rpm	310 N⋅m (229 lb⋅ft) @ 1900 rpm

*Available option - 4motion AWD with 6 speed manual transmission

=== Mark 1B/Phase 1.75 (2004–2010) ===
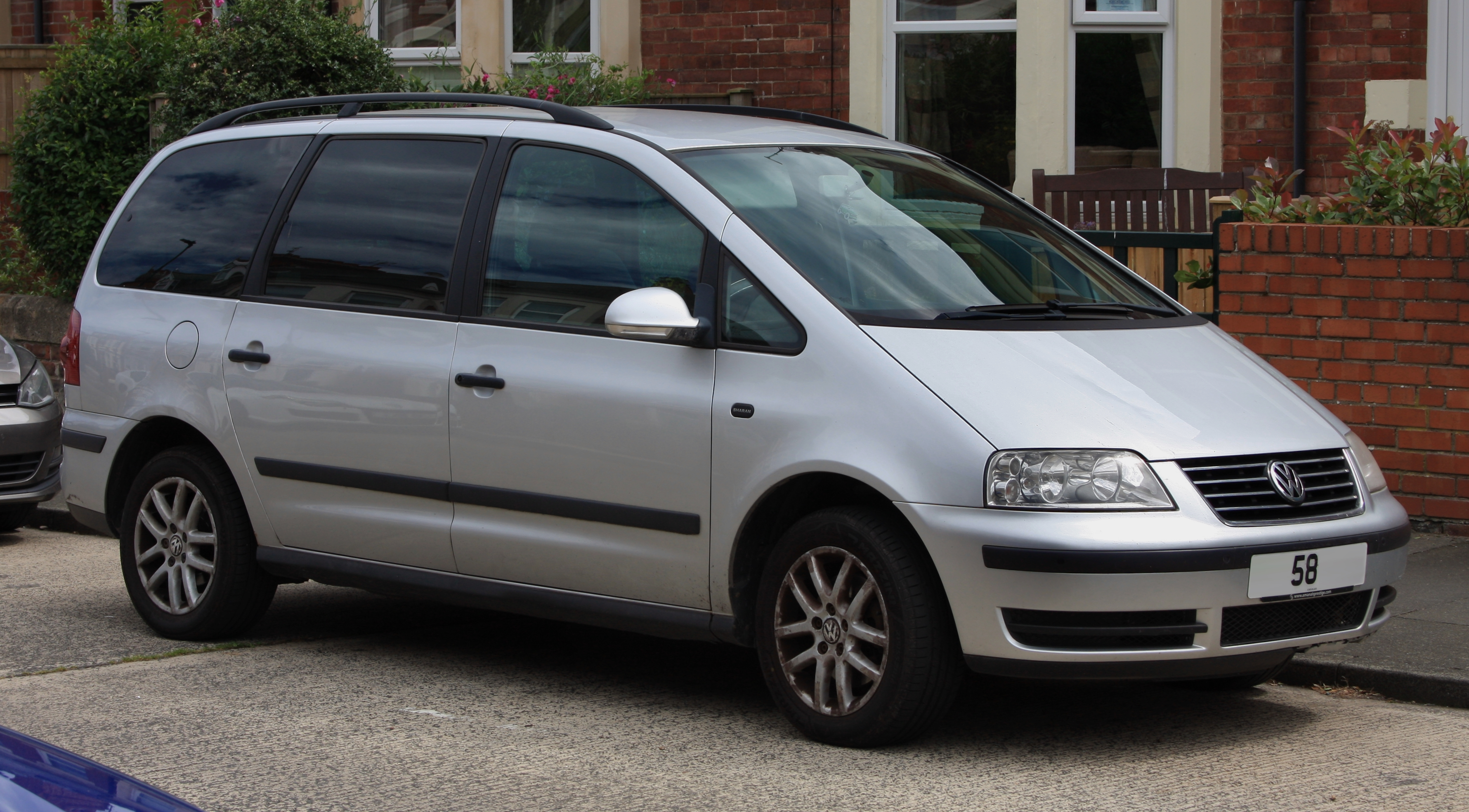
Second facelift, 2004–2010

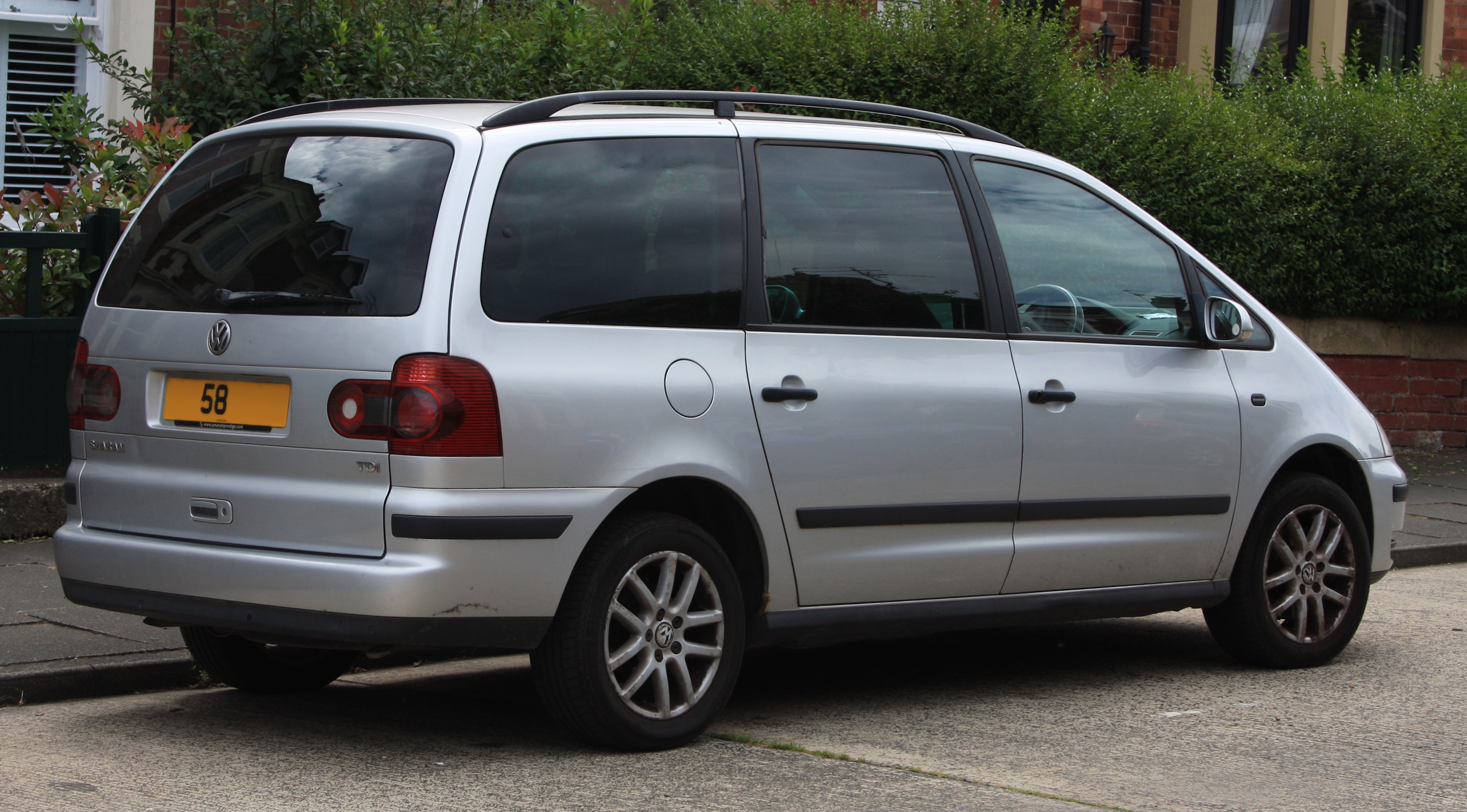
Second facelift, 2004–2010

A further minor cosmetic facelift was implemented in September 2003 at Frankfurt Motor Show for the 2004 model year. This changed, primarily, the grille, and tail lights (round). Also, more standard equipment was added, including air conditioning and curtain side air bags. In 2006, Ford independently introduced a new Galaxy which was not based on the Sharan and Alhambra designs from the Volkswagen Group.

The new Galaxy was built at a dedicated Ford plant in Limburg, Belgium. The last first generation Ford Galaxy rolled off the AutoEuropa line at the end of 2005, while the first generation Sharan and SEAT Alhambra continued in production, alongside the Volkswagen Eos and the new Scirocco, until August 2010.

A BlueMotion variant was introduced in 2008 and went on sale in Germany in May 2008, with lower (159g/km) CO_{2} emissions and average fuel consumption of 38 mpg U.S. In the UK only 60 BlueMotions were expected to shift per year, and it was on sale there until February 2011.

==== Engines ====
Model	Years	Engine and code		Displ.	Power	Torque
1.8T	2003–2005	I4 20V	AWC	1781 cc	110 kW (150 PS; 148 hp) @ 5800 rpm	220 N⋅m (162 lb⋅ft) @ 1800 rpm
2.0	2003–2007	I4 8V	ATM	1984 cc	85 kW (116 PS; 114 hp) @ 5200 rpm	170 N⋅m (125 lb⋅ft) @ 2600 rpm
2.8 VR6	2003–2008	VR6 24V	AYL	2792 cc	150 kW (204 PS; 201 hp) @ 6200 rpm	265 N⋅m (195 lb⋅ft) @ 3400 rpm
1.9 TDI	2006–2010	I4 8V	BVK	1896 cc	85 kW (116 PS; 114 hp) @ 4000 rpm	310 N⋅m (229 lb⋅ft) @ 1900 rpm
1.9 TDI	2003–2007	I4 8V	ASZ	1896 cc	96 kW (131 PS; 129 hp) @ 4000 rpm	310 N⋅m (229 lb⋅ft) @ 1900 rpm
1.9 TDI	2003–2009	I4 8V	BTB	1896 cc	110 kW (150 PS; 148 hp) @ 4000 rpm	320 N⋅m (236 lb⋅ft) @ 1900 rpm
2.0 TDI	2006–2010	I4 8V	BRT	1968 cc	103 kW (140 PS; 138 hp) @ 4000 rpm	310 N⋅m (229 lb⋅ft) @ 1900 rpm

=== LPG version ===
In June 2006, PrinceGas and Volkswagen launched the Sharan with a 2.0 L 85 kW (114 hp) flexible fuel engine, which could work with either petrol or autogas (liquified petroleum gas), providing an additional 450 km (280 mi) range over the regular 2.0L petrol engine. Both fuel tanks, the 70L (18 US gallon) petrol tank and the 60L liquid gas tank combined, give the Sharan enough fuel to cover 730 km (454 mi) between refuels at an average fuel consumption of 9.6 L/100 km.

The liquid gas tank is built into the spare wheel well so it does not compromise on passenger and loading space of the Sharan's interior, although it does eliminate the spare tyre.

=== Safety ===
Euro NCAP test results Volkswagen Sharan TDi (1999)
Test	Score	Rating
Adult occupant:	21	3 /5 stars
Pedestrian:	10	2 /4 stars

== Second generation (Typ 7N; 2010) ==
Second generation
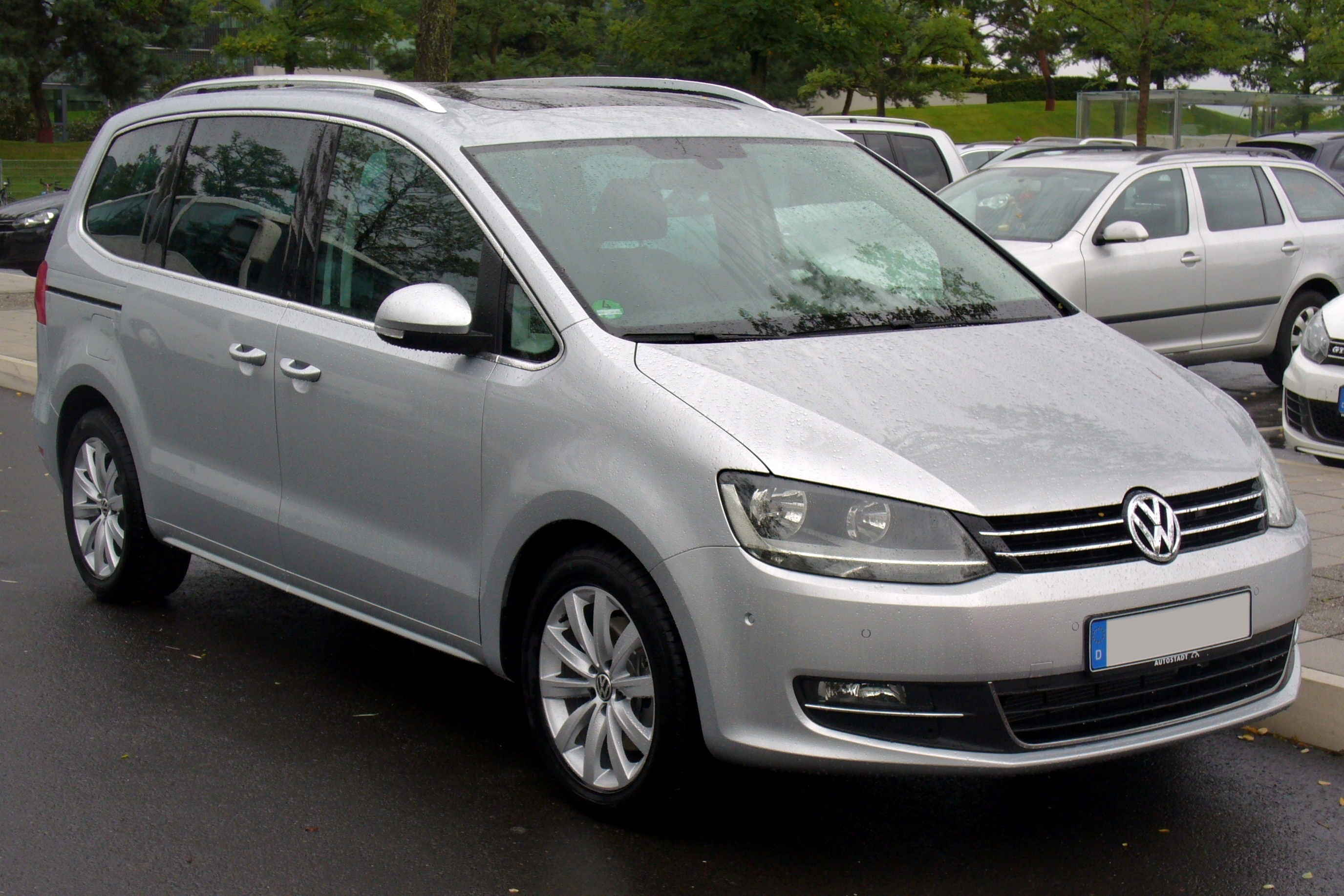

Overview
- Model code: 7N
- Also called: SEAT Alhambra
- Production: 2010–2022
- Assembly: Portugal: Palmela (AutoEuropa)

Body and chassis
- Platform: Volkswagen Group A6 (PQ46)
- Related: Volkswagen Passat (B7); Volkswagen Tiguan Mk1; Škoda Superb (B6); SEAT Alhambra Mk2

Powertrain
- Engine: Petrol: 1.4L 110 kW (150 PS) TSI; 2.0L 147 kW (200 PS) TSI; Diesel: 2.0L 103 kW (140 PS) TDI; 2.0L 125 kW (170 PS) TDI
- Transmission: 6-speed manual; 5-speed Tiptronic automatic; 6-speed DSG automatic

Dimensions
- Wheelbase: 2,920 mm (115.0 in)
- Length: 4,850 mm (190.9 in)
- Width: 1,924 mm (75.7 in)
- Height: 1,720 mm (67.7 in)

The second generation Sharan, based on the Volkswagen Passat (B7), was launched at the 2010 Geneva Motor Show and a month later, the second generation of its sibling model, the SEAT Alhambra, was officially announced. Sales commenced in September 2010.

Although still built at the AutoEuropa factory in Portugal, the new model inherits only its name from the previous Sharan, compared to which it is 220 mm (8.7 in) longer, 92 mm (3.6 in) wider and 12 mm (0.5 in) lower, with the wheelbase lengthened by 75 mm (3.0 in).

Weight has been reduced by 30 kg (66 lb). The initial engine range comprises 1.4-litre TSI (148 bhp) and 2.0-litre (197 bhp) petrol options, plus two 2.0-litre TDI diesel engines, rated at 140 PS (103 kW; 138 hp) and 168 bhp (125 kW; 170 PS). The rear doors now slide open rather than being hinged.

In March 2020, Volkswagen ceased production of the Sharan MPV for the Chinese market in favor of the brand new model, China-only Volkswagen Viloran. The car remained in available in Europe after more than 12 years' presence.

The VW Sharan was discontinued in the UK in 2021 but continued to be available elsewhere in Europe. However, in October 2022, the VW Sharan finally ended production in Portugal after more than a decade of production of the second generation model. No replacement is planned as the market has shifted away from large MPVs to crossovers and SUVs.

=== Gallery ===
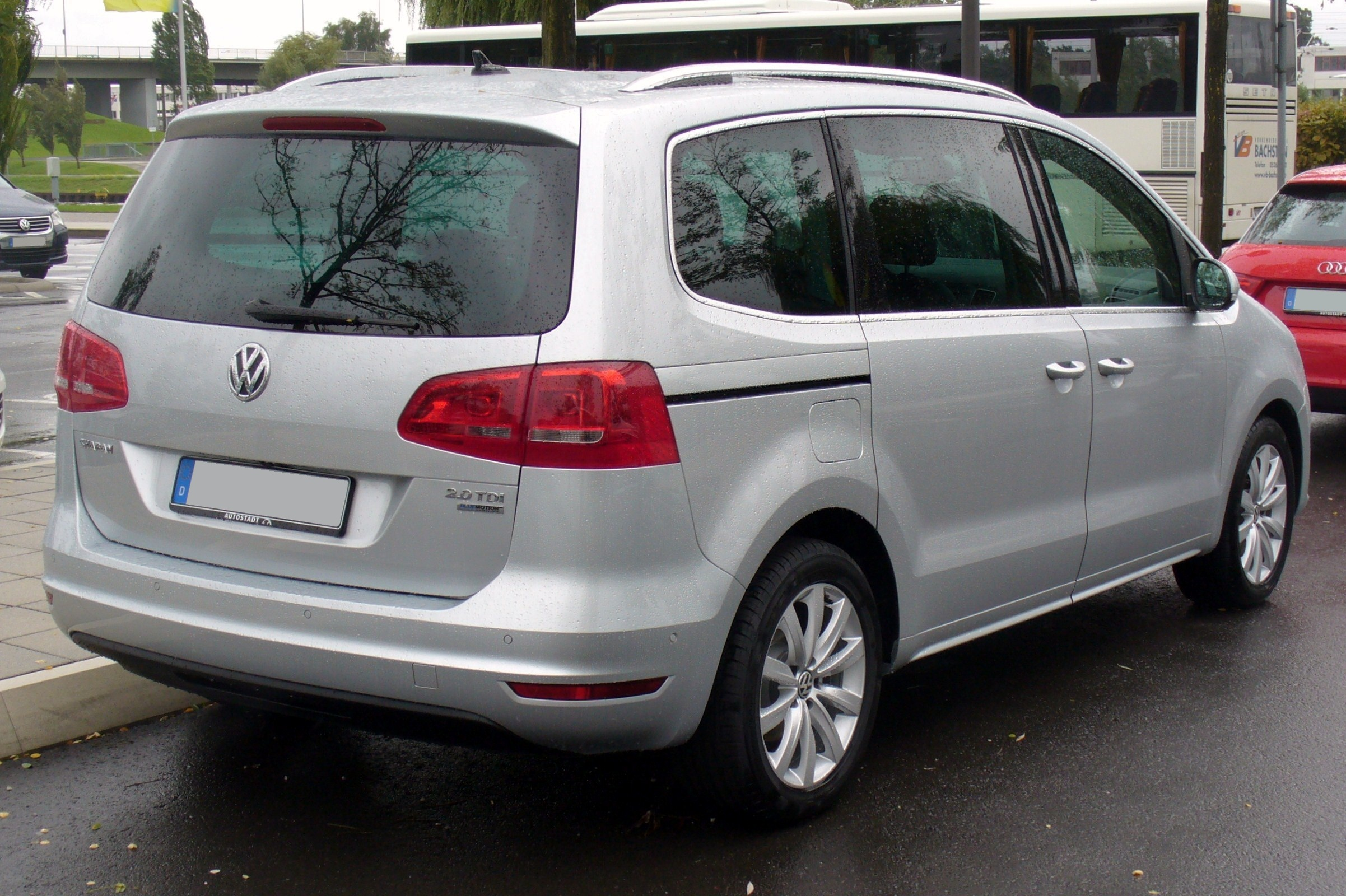
Volkswagen Sharan 2.0 TDI

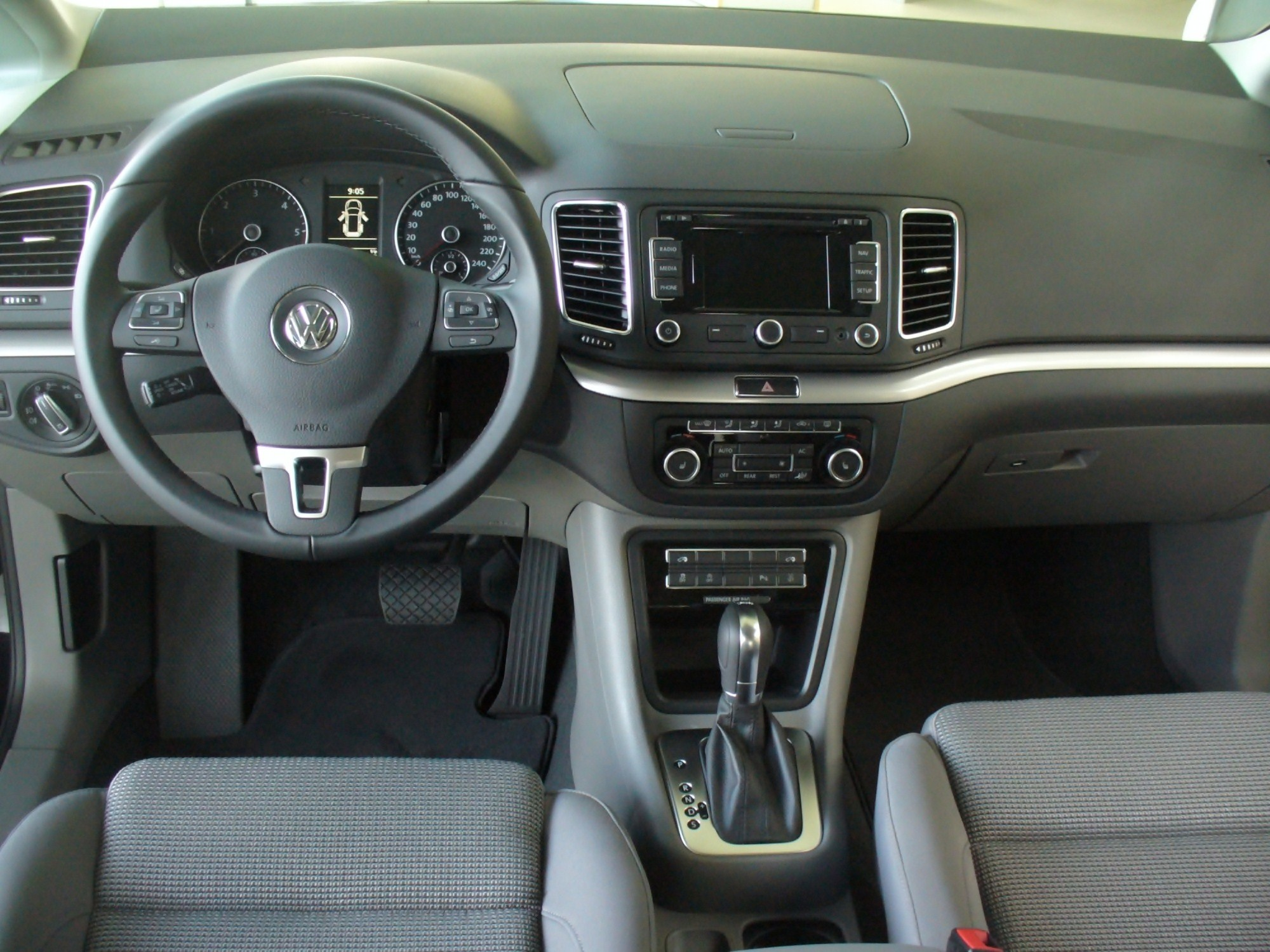
Interior

=== Facelift ===
At the 2015 Geneva Motor Show, a facelifted Sharan was unveiled to the public. It has new electronic systems and engines with reduced fuel consumption. Its 2.0 litre TSI engine (220 PS (217 hp; 162 kW), 350 N⋅m (258 lb⋅ft)) and six speed direct-shift gearbox are the same as in the 2016 Golf GTI.

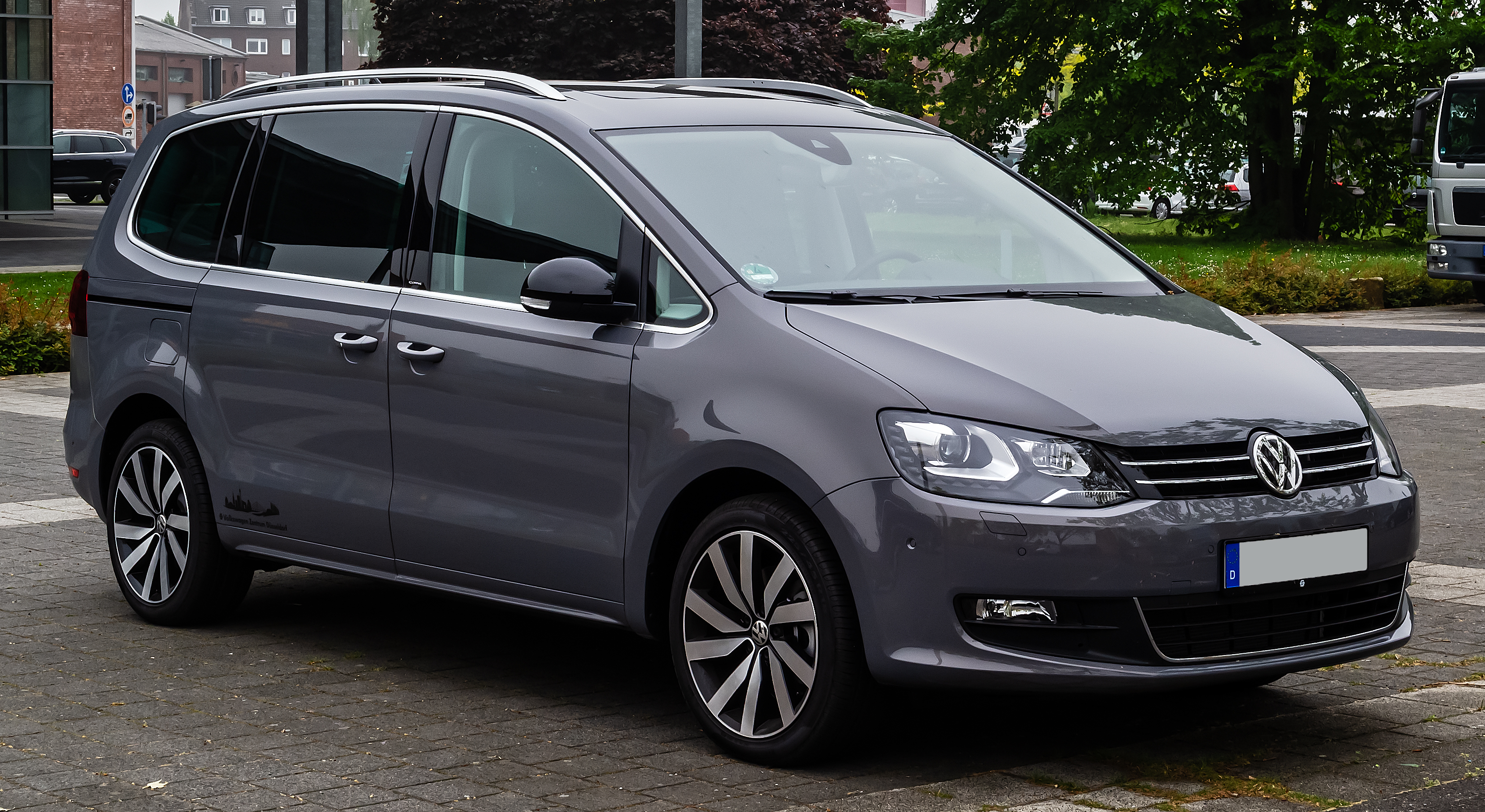
Front view (facelift)

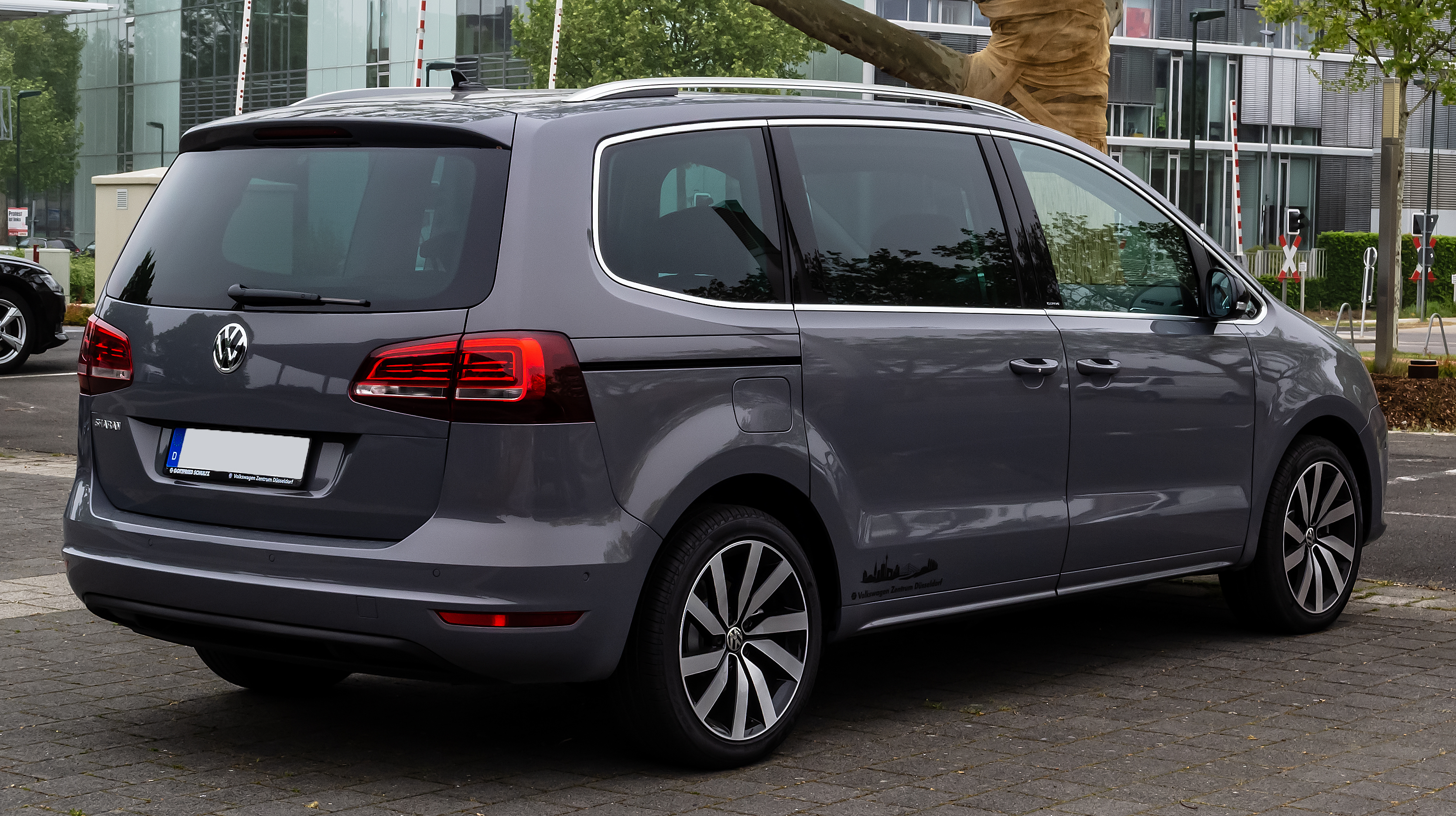
Rear view (facelift)

=== Safety ===
==== Euro NCAP ====
Euro NCAP test results Volkswagen Sharan 1.4 'Comfortline' (LHD) (2019)
Test	Points	%
Overall:	4 /5 stars	
Adult occupant:	34	89%
Child occupant:	38.4	78%
Pedestrian:	28.7	59%
Safety assist:	8.2	62%
