= Robert Lešnik =

Slovenian automobile designer

Robert Lešnik is a car designer, born 1971 in Limbuš, Slovenia.

After three failed attempts to enter the Academy of Fine Arts and Design, he registered at the University of Pforzheim, and while there he took an exam to work with Volkswagen. He succeeded and stayed at Volkswagen for nine years as exterior design team leader. In April 2007 he moved to Kia Motors and left it in September 2009 for Mercedes-Benz, where he has headed the Exterior Design department, since 2014.

He won the "Designer of the year, 2006" award, a Slovenian award for industrial design.

== Design contributions ==
- Volkswagen Passat (B6)
- Volkswagen Concept C, concept car for Eos
- Volkswagen Eos design team headed by Peter Schreyer, Head of Volkswagen Design.
- Volkswagen Iroc, concept car for Scirocco
- Volkswagen Scirocco
- Mercedes-Benz C-Class (W205)
- Mercedes-Benz E-Class (W212) (Facelift)
- Mercedes-Benz E-Class (W213)
- Mercedes-Benz E-Class (W214)
- Mercedes-Benz S-Class (W222)
- Mercedes-Benz S-Class (C217)
- Mercedes-Benz CLA (C117)
- Mercedes-Benz GLA (X156)
- Mercedes-AMG GT (C190/R190)
- Mercedes-Benz CLS (C257)
- Mercedes-Benz GLE (W167/C167)
