= Greg M. Greeson =

American automobile designer

Greg M. Greeson is an American automotive designer and entrepreneur.

== Design work ==
Greeson graduated from the Art Center College of Design in 1977. He has worked as a designer for a number of automobile firms. His career began at General Motors' German subsidiary, Adam Opel AG, in 1977. In 1979, he was promoted to assistant chief designer to renowned designer and illustrator Hideo Kodama, and was responsible for a number of concept and pre-production vehicle designs.

In 1980, he founded Eurway, Inc. in Dallas, Texas, a contemporary furniture store. In 1984, he was sent to Vevey, Switzerland as recruitment director for Art Center's Swiss campus, which opened in 1986. Greeson then worked at Volkswagen Design's Düsseldorf studio, where he was a senior designer and responsible for the exterior design of the 1992 Volkswagen Sharan minivan. He joined International Automotive Design in 1991 as managing director of its Germany subsidiary, based near Frankfurt. IAD Germany's clients included Opel, Mercedes-Benz, Mitsubishi, and Ford.

In 1995, he returned to Texas and expanded Eurway, Inc. to three superstores and a highly successful e-commerce operation; sales exceeded $24 million when he sold his interest in the company in 2004.

Greeson's independent industrial design and illustration consultancy, GRID Design, provided design and consulting services to Ford Motor Company, most notably with a 2000 full-size concept model for the MY-2005 Mustang. His automotive illustrations have appeared in the Mercedes-Benz Club of America STAR magazine and the BMW CCA Roundel.

In 2006, Greeson, with his wife Joni, opened an upscale furniture store in Austin, Texas; the concept was broadened and the name changed to Collectic Home in 2007.
