= SEAT Alhambra =

Large multi-purpose vehicle

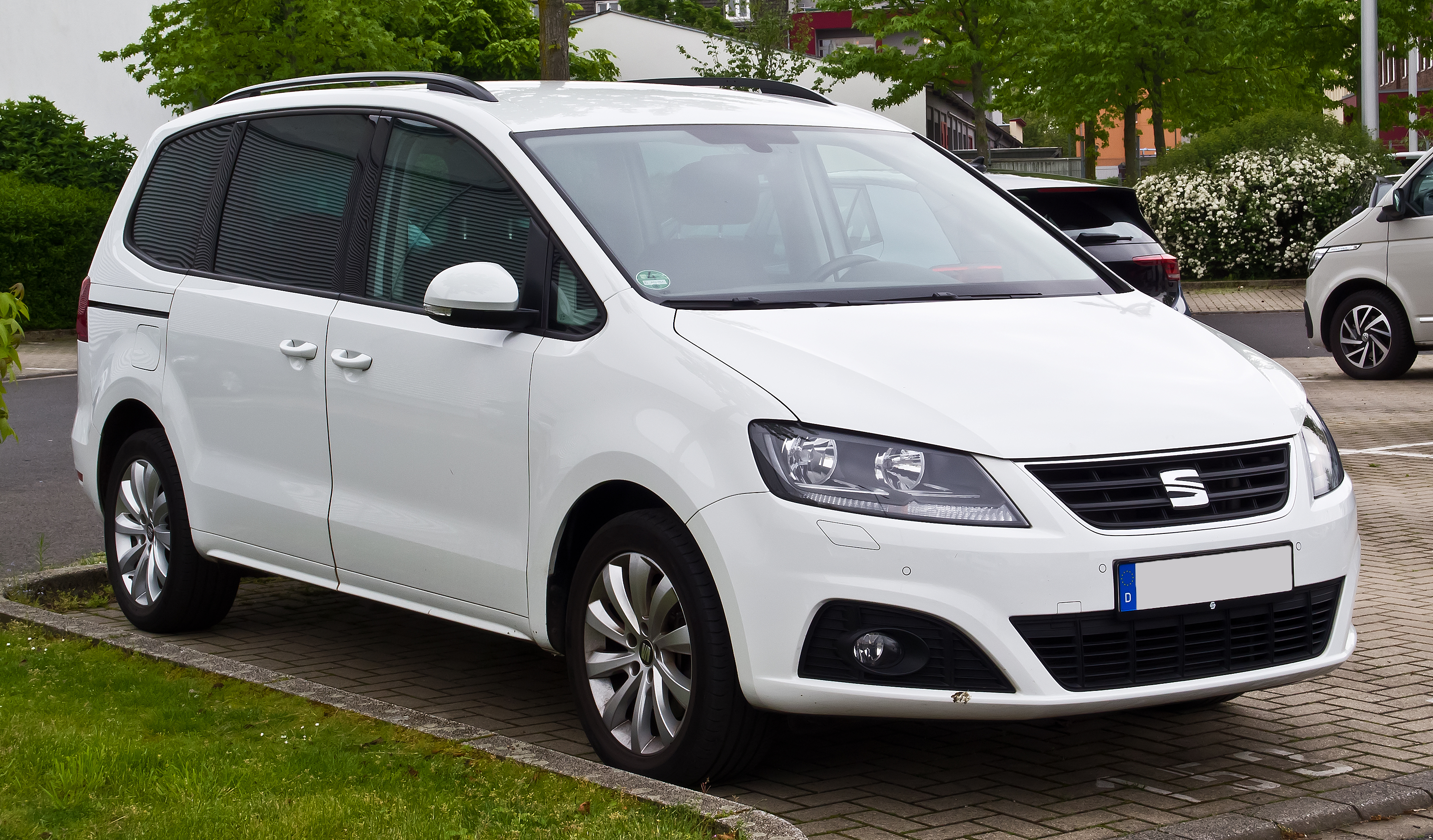

Overview
- Manufacturer: SEAT
- Also called: Volkswagen Sharan; Ford Galaxy (1996–2006)
- Production: 1996–2020
- Assembly: Portugal: Palmela (Autoeuropa)

Body and chassis
- Class: Large MPV (M)
- Body style: 5-door MPV
- Layout: Front-engine, front-wheel-drive/four-wheel-drive

The SEAT Alhambra is a seven-seater minivan that was built from 1996 to 2020. It was manufactured under the SEAT brand from June 1996 onwards at the Volkswagen Group's AutoEuropa plant in Palmela, Portugal. It shares the same platform with the Volkswagen Sharan, and the first generation was also related to the Ford Galaxy. The vehicle is named after the Alhambra of Granada, a famous monument in Spain. It is considered in the motor industry to be a large multi-purpose vehicle (MPV).

== First generation (Typ 7M; 1996) ==
SEAT Alhambra Mk1 (7M)
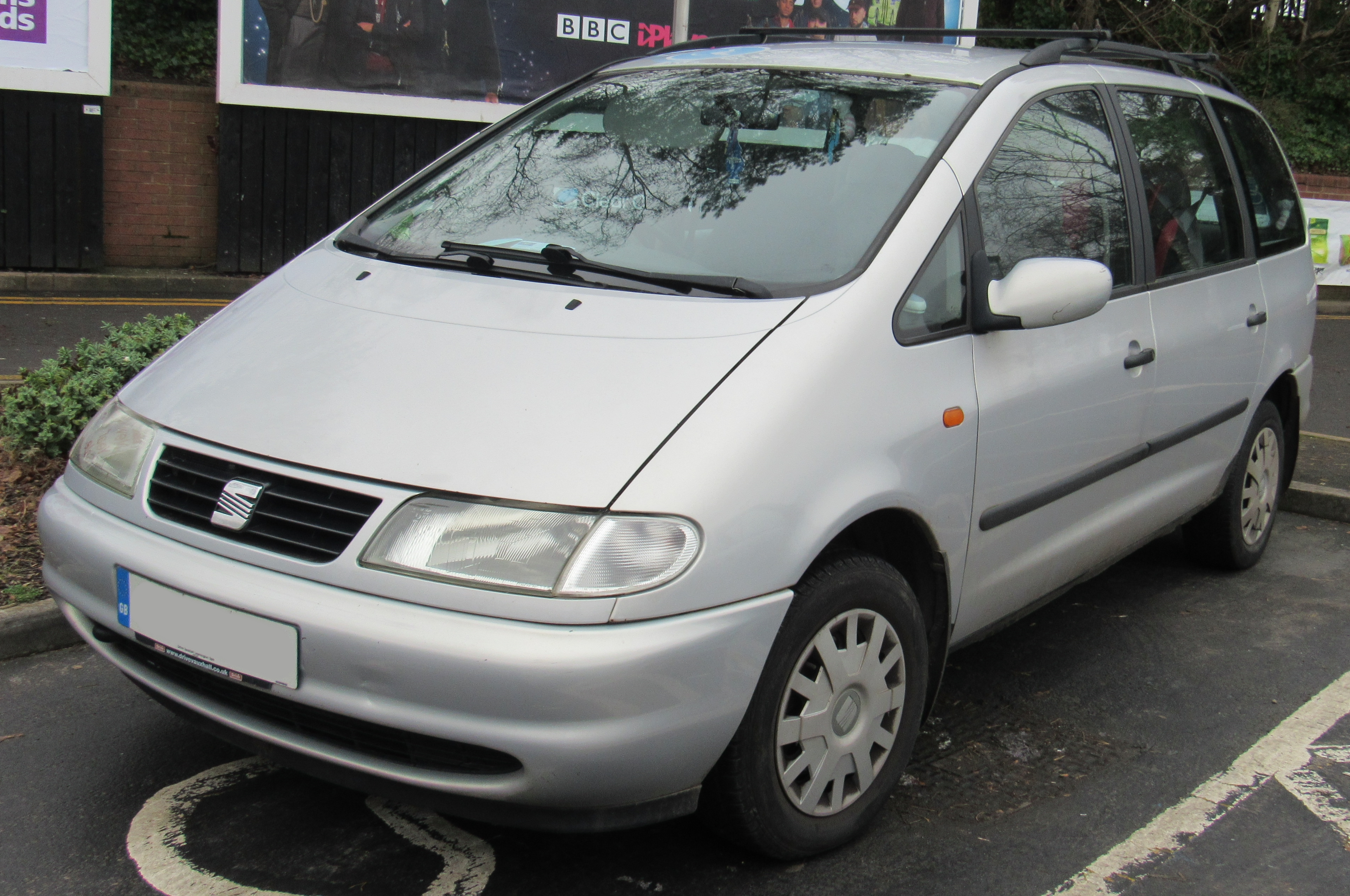

Overview
- Also called: Volkswagen Sharan; Ford Galaxy (before 2006)
- Production: 1996–2010

Powertrain
- Engine: Petrol engines: 1.8 L I4 20V Turbo; 2.0 L I4; 2.8 L VR6 24v Diesel engines: 1.9 L I4 TDI; 2.0 L I4 TDI
- Transmission: 6-speed manual 5-speed automatic 5-speed Tiptronic automatic

Dimensions
- Wheelbase: 2,835 mm (111.6 in)
- Length: 4,634 mm (182.4 in)
- Width: 1,810 mm (71.3 in)
- Height: 1,762 mm (69.4 in)
- Curb weight: 1,599–1,709 kg (3,525–3,768 lb)

A prototype of the first generation SEAT Alhambra was presented at the 1995 Geneva Salon International de l'Auto. The following year the production Alhambra was launched at the same motor show and went on sale in June. The Alhambra shares most of its components and design with the VW Sharan Mk1 and Ford Galaxy Mk1. However, the Alhambra has more options fitted for a given price range. The Alhambra has seven seats—the five rear seats can be folded down or unclipped and removed completely. When removed the seats leave a flat-floored load space, a unique feature for SEAT vehicles at that time. The load volume varies, from 256l with seven seats, to 852l with five seats, and 2610l with only the two front seats fitted.

The Alhambra was essentially unchanged from 1996 to 2010 but a major restyling in the year 2000 reflected the new SEAT image. Even so, the Alhambra remained faithful to the original design produced under the Volkswagen Group and Ford technology sharing agreement. When Volkswagen and Ford lost market share to other manufacture's MPVs, including the Toyota Previa and Mitsubishi Space Wagon, they changed the design of their versions.

The Alhambra, Sharan, and Galaxy were built on the same production line at the joint venture AutoEuropa plant in Palmela, Portugal, and were essentially the same but with different engine options and interiors. Ford has now withdrawn from the collaboration, and the Galaxy Mk III and the S-Max (a seven-seater based on the Mondeo Mk IV platform) are built in Genk, Belgium, alongside the Mondeo. The AutoEuropa plant did produce the VW Scirocco III from 2008 to 2017.

Introduced in 2009, the SEAT Alhambra Ecomotive is fitted with the 2.0 TDI 140 PS (103 kW) engine producing 159 g/km CO_{2} emissions.

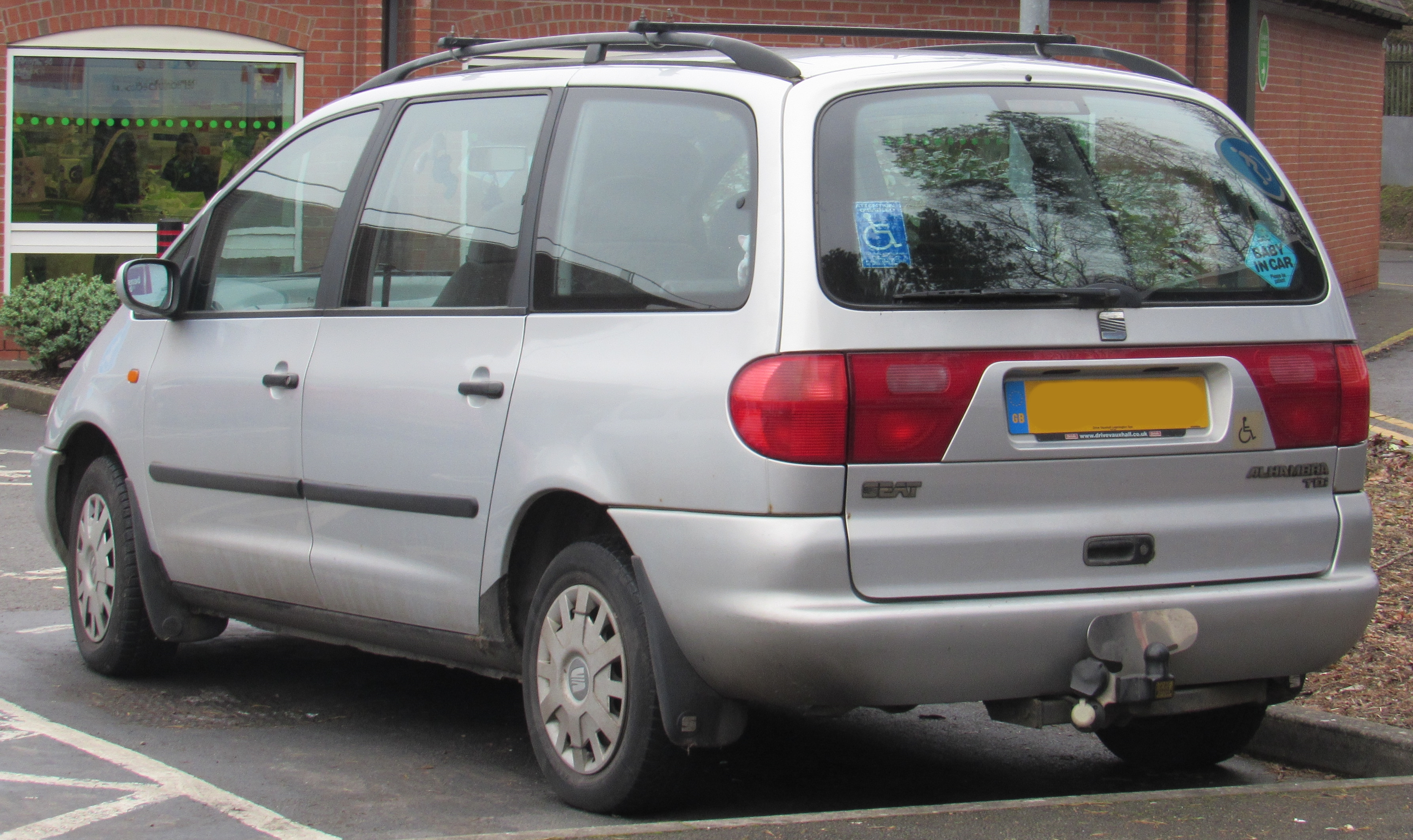
Seat Alhambra pre-facelift (United Kingdom)

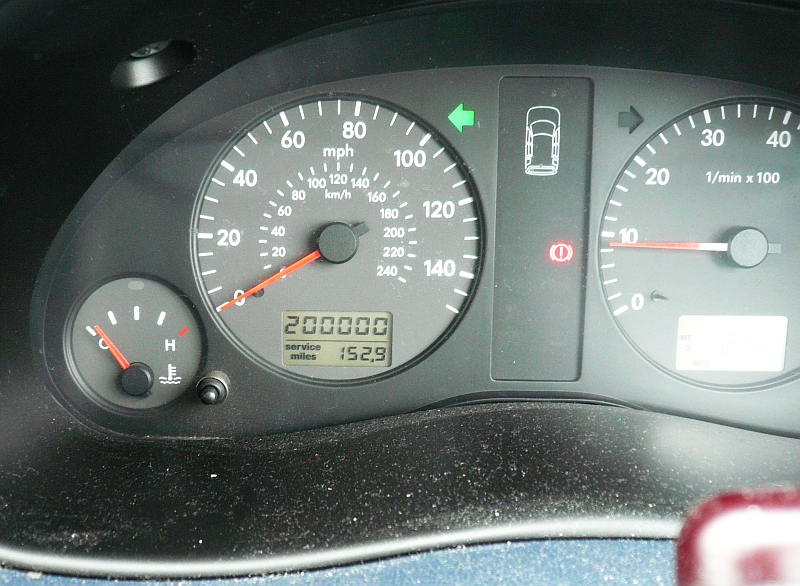
SEAT Alhambra first generation pre-facelift instrument panel

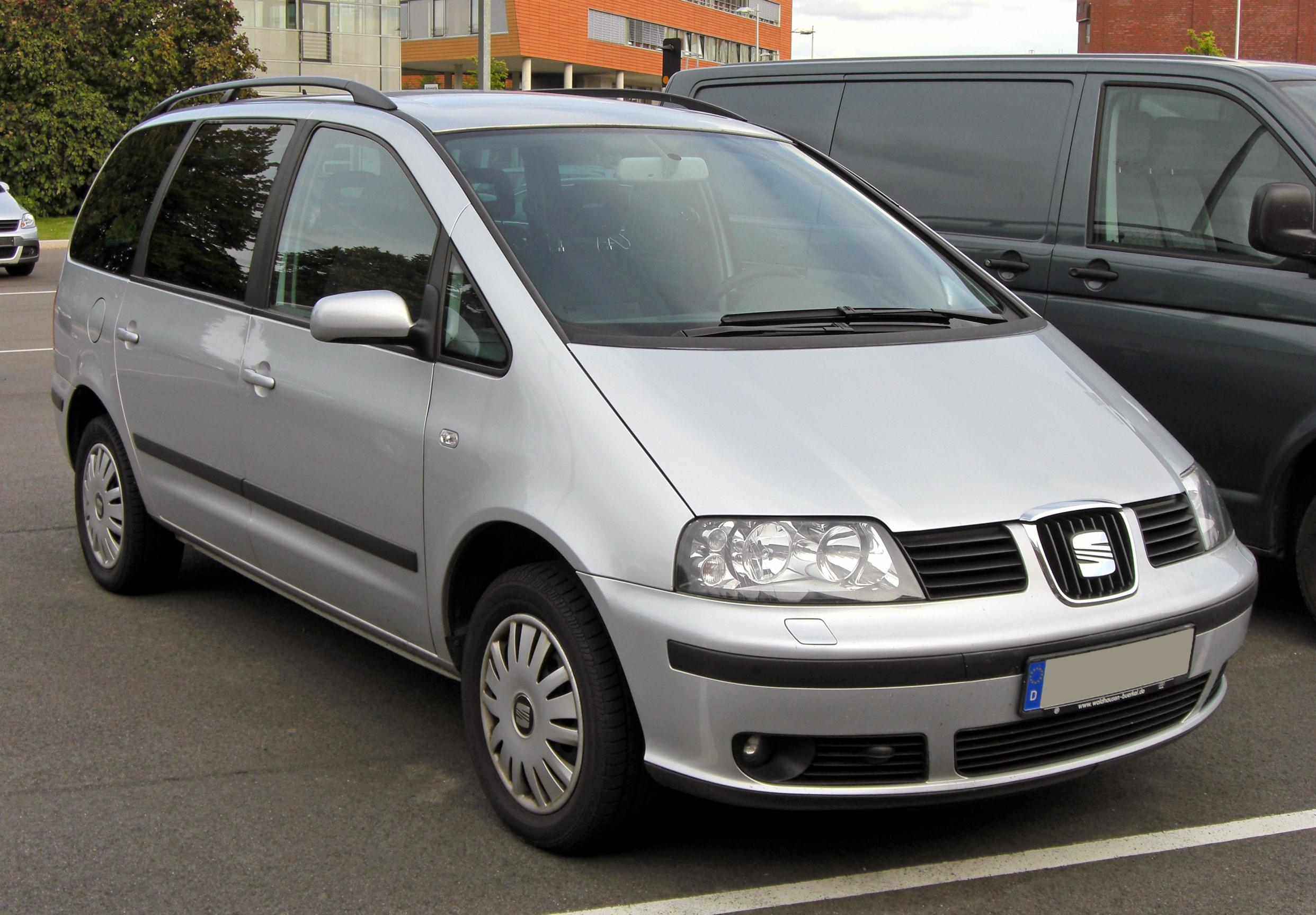
Seat Alhambra facelift (Europe)

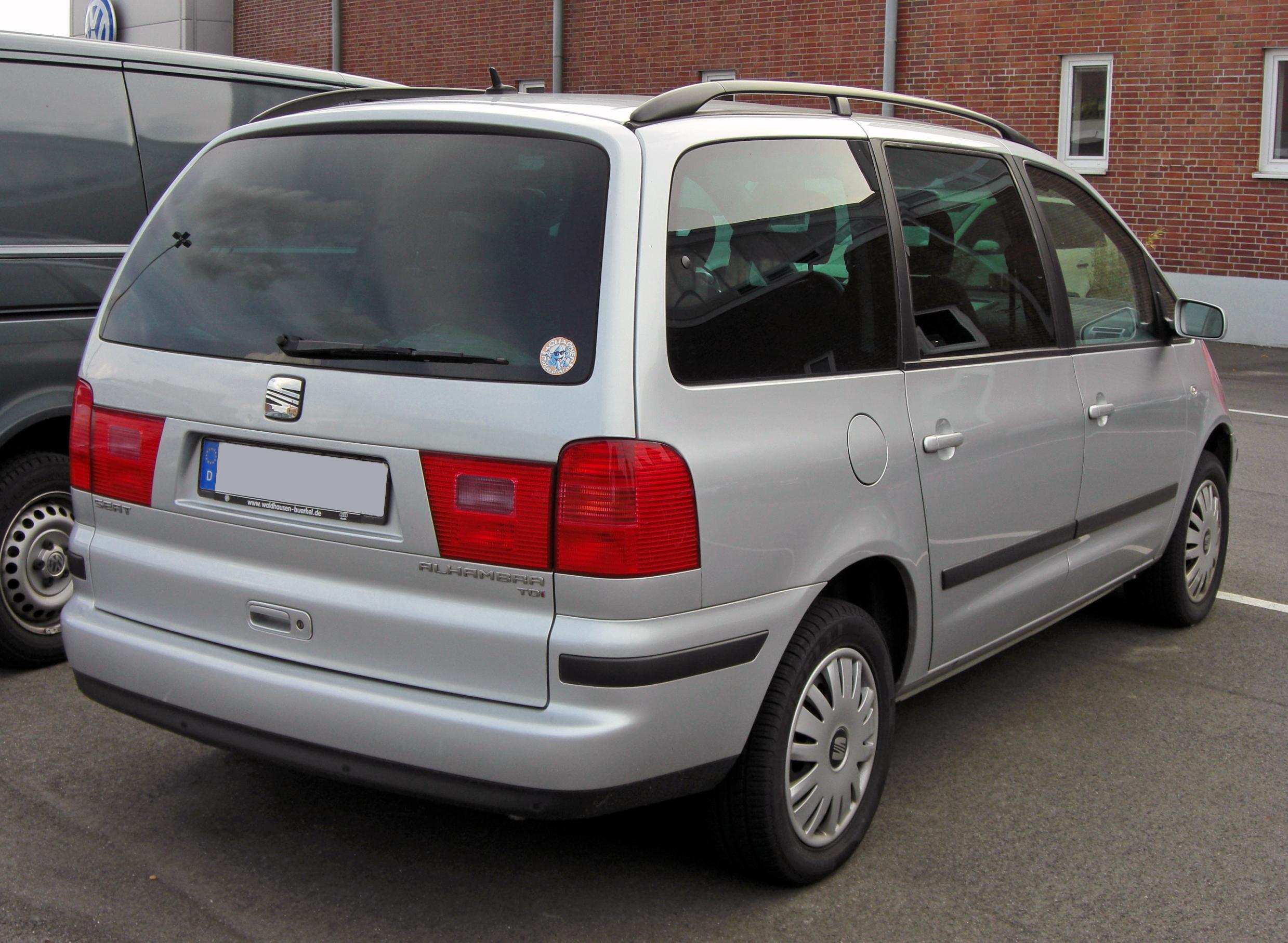
Seat Alhambra facelift (Europe)

=== Awards ===
- 'Monovolume do Ano' award in 1997, in Portugal

=== Engines ===
- Petrol
  - 1.8L I4 110 kW (150 PS) 20V Turbo
  - 2.0L I4 85 kW (116 PS)
  - 2.8L VR6 150 kW (204 PS) 24V
- Diesel
  - 1.9L I4 66 kW (90 PS) TDI
  - 1.9L I4 81 kW (110 PS) TDI
  - 1.9L I4 85 kW (116 PS) TDI
  - 1.9L I4 96 kW (131 PS) TDI
  - 1.9L I4 110 kW (150 PS) TDI
  - 2.0L I4 103 kW (140 PS) TDI

== Second generation (Typ 7N; 2010) ==
SEAT Alhambra Mk2 (7N)
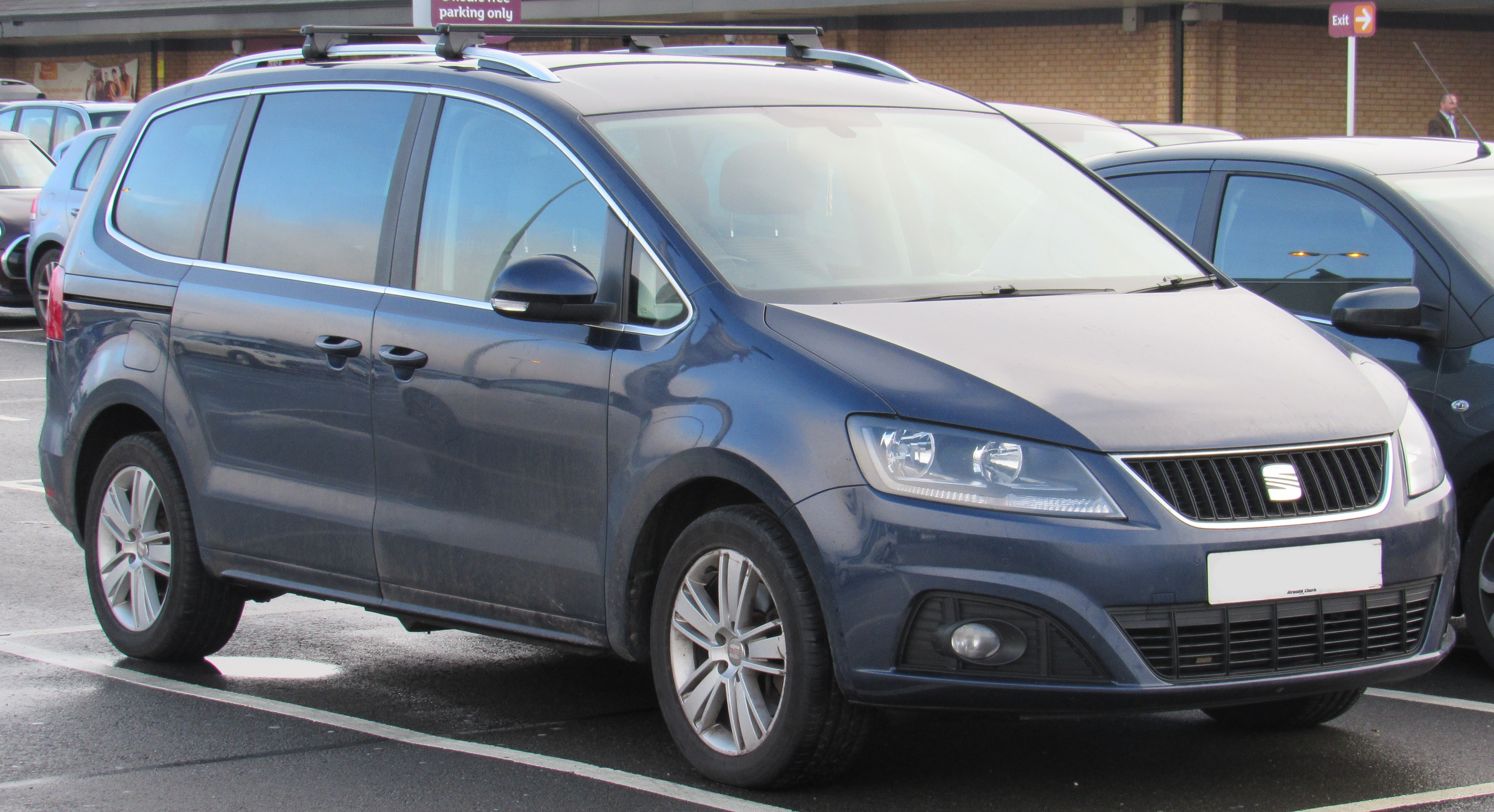

Overview
- Also called: Volkswagen Sharan
- Production: 2010–2020

Body and chassis
- Platform: Volkswagen Group A6 (PQ46)

Powertrain
- Engine: Petrol engines: 1.4 L 110 kW (148 hp) TSI; 2.0 L 147 kW (197 hp) TSI; Diesel engines: 2.0 L 103 kW (138 hp) TDI; 2.0 L 125 kW (168 hp) TDI

Dimensions
- Length: 4,850 mm (190.9 in)

The second generation SEAT Alhambra went on sale in October 2010. At 4.85 m (15.9 ft) long it is 22 cm longer and 9 cm wider than the first generation. Like the Sharan access to the middle row of seats is via sliding doors.

In February 2013 SEAT presented the Alhambra four-wheel-drive version featuring a permanent all wheel drive combined with the 2.0 TDI 103 kW (140 PS; 138 hp) diesel engine and a manual six-speed gearbox.

In September 2015 the UK diesel models of the Alhambra were revised to meet the Euro 6 standards and the power outputs increased from 103 kW (140 PS; 138 hp) to 110 kW (150 PS; 148 hp) and from 130 kW (177 PS; 174 hp) to 135 kW (184 PS; 181 hp).

In March 2020 SEAT announced production of the Alhambra would end that month.

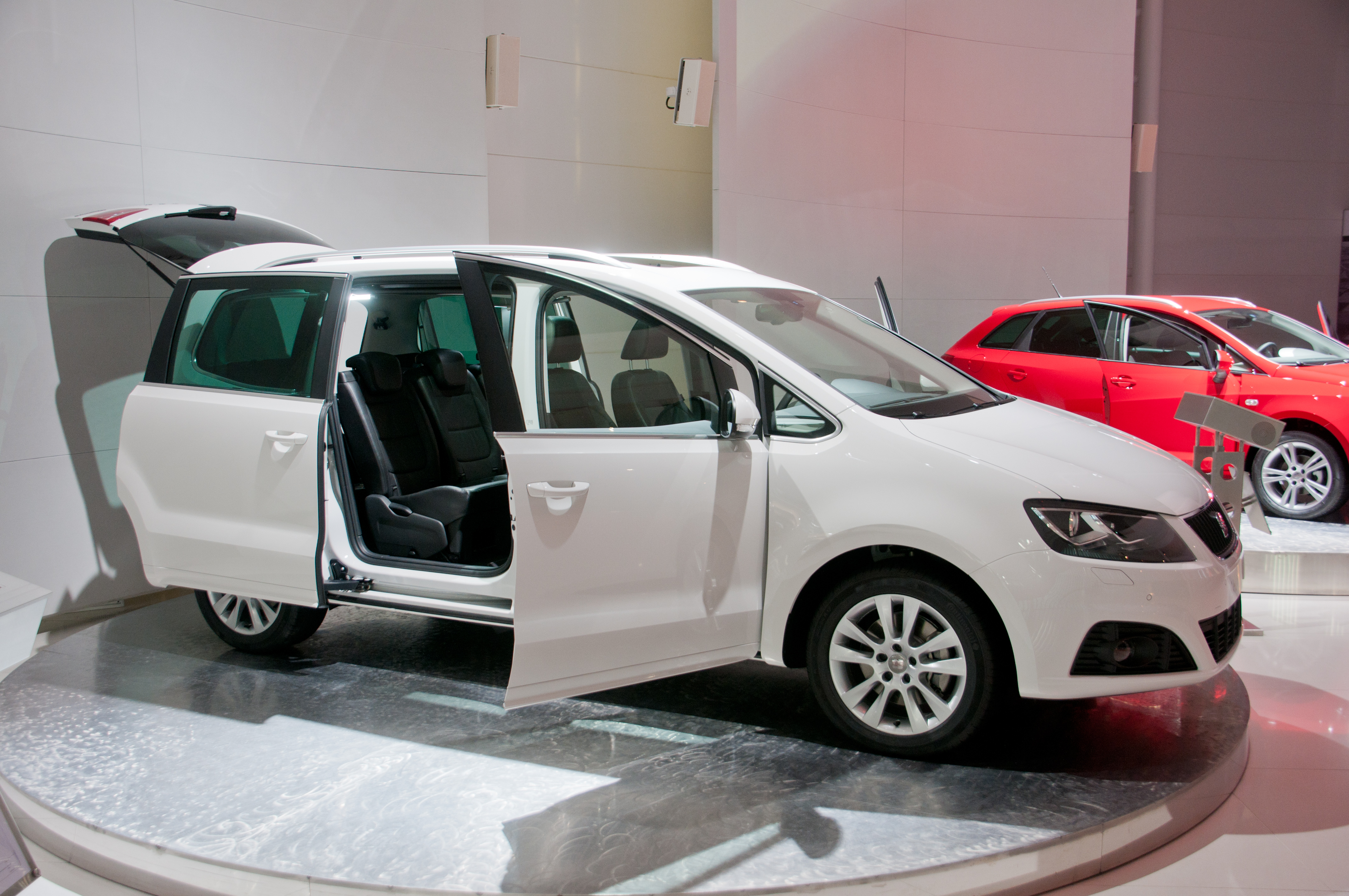
SEAT Alhambra second generation rear doors now slide open rather than being hinged.

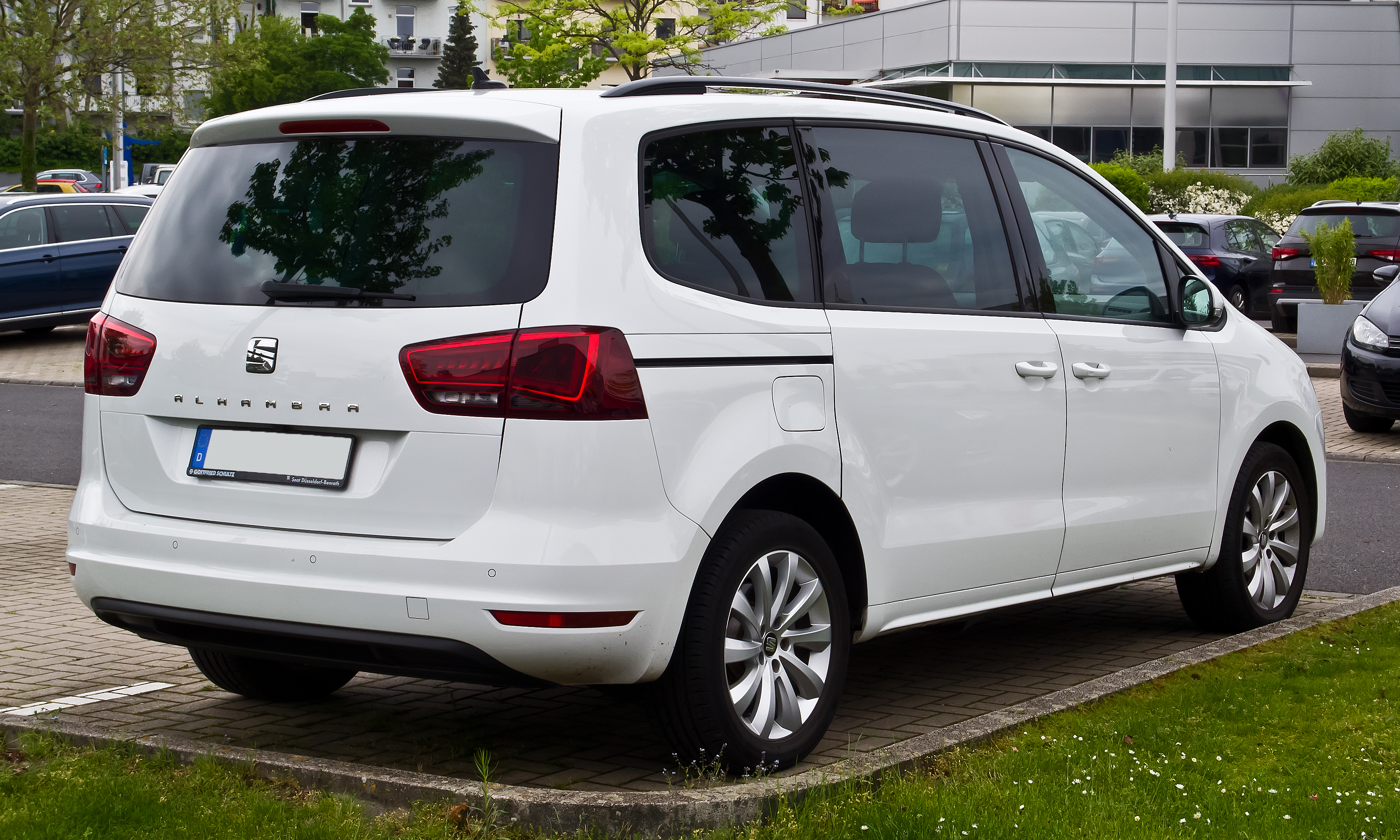
Rear view

=== Safety ===
==== Euro NCAP ====
===== 2010 =====
In 2010, the safety of the second generation SEAT Alhambra was assessed under the Euro NCAP scheme; it achieved a 5-star overall rating:

Test	Score	Points
Overall:	5/5 stars	N/A
Adult occupant:	96%	34
Child occupant:	80%	39
Pedestrian:	46%	16
Safety assist:	71%	5

===== 2019 =====
The Alhambra in its standard European market configuration received 4 stars from Euro NCAP in 2019.

=== Awards ===
- ‘Auto Trophy’ 2010 for the imported MPV category, by the German car magazine Autozeitung
- ‘Best imported MPV’ in 2011, by the readers of the German car magazine Auto, Motor und Sport
- ‘Best MPV on the market’ award in 2011, by the British magazine What Car?
- ‘Best MPV’ in 2011, at the UK Fleet World Honours
- ‘Best MPV’ in 2011, by the British motoring magazine Diesel Car
- ‘MPV of the Year’ award in 2011, by panel members of the Portuguese ‘Car of the Year – Crystal Steering Wheel Trophy’
- ‘Best MPV’ in 2011, at the second edition of the Ecomotor Awards, organised by the Spanish newspaper El Economista
- ‘Best MPV on the market’ award in 2012, by the British magazine What Car?
- ‘Best MPV on the market’ award in 2013, by the British magazine What Car?

=== Engines ===
- Petrol
  - 1.4 L 110 kW (150 hp) TSI
  - 2.0 L 147 kW (200 hp) TSI
- Diesel
  - 2.0 L 103 kW (140 hp) TDI
  - 2.0 L 130 kW (177 hp) TDI
  - 2.0 L 85 kW (114 hp) TDI

== Sales ==
Since 1996, almost 500,000 SEAT Alhambra have been sold. In the year 2009, the total annual retail sales number of SEAT Alhambra cars was 6,215 vehicles. The total production per year of Alhambras is shown below:

Model	SEAT Alhambra Total annual production
1996	10,513
1997	16,503
1998	21,300
1999	27,440
2000	23,924
2001	26,524
2002	26,308
2003	23,693
2004	21,580
2005	14,902
2006	14,352
2007	14,242
2008	10,282
2009	6,215
2010	10,023
2011	18,139
2012	19,393
2013	19,990
2014	22,612
2015	27,925
2016	31,214
2017	33,638
2018	19,588
2019	23,015
2020	14,672
Total	497,987
