= Volkswagen Autoeuropa =

Auto assembly plant in Palmela, Portugal

- Industry: Automotive industry
- Founded: December 3, 1991
- Founder: Volkswagen Group
- Products: Volkswagen T-Roc; Stamped parts
- Number of employees: 4,980 ▼ (2022)
- Parent: Volkswagen Group
- Website: https://www.volkswagenautoeuropa.pt/

Volkswagen Autoeuropa Lda. is an automotive assembly plant, located in the city of Palmela, near Lisbon, Portugal. Formed in 1991 as a joint venture between Ford and Volkswagen, it began operations in 1995 and from 1999 became fully owned by Volkswagen when Ford left the joint venture. It is the largest foreign industrial investment in Portugal. It is currently the production site for the Volkswagen T-Roc.

== History ==
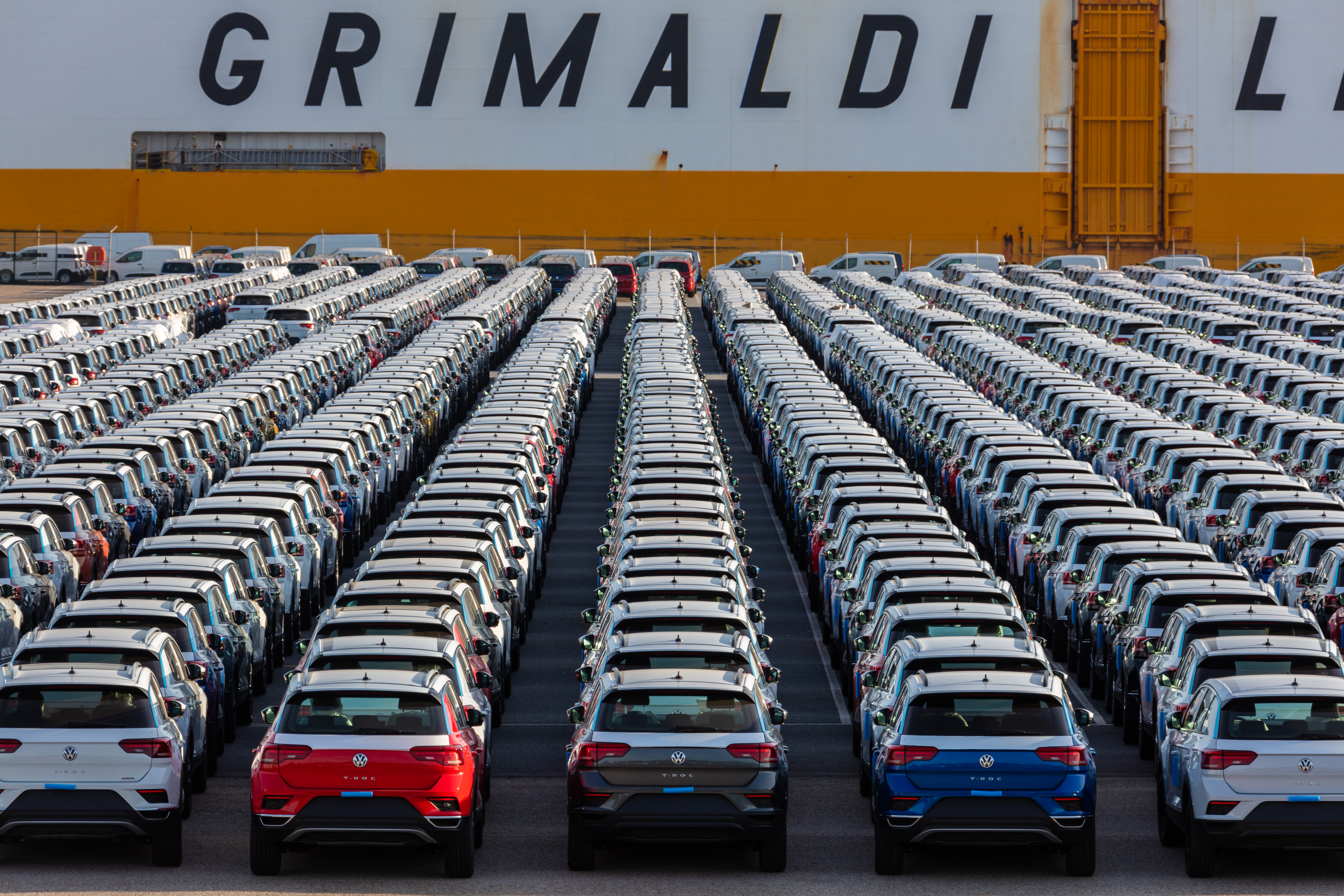
Cars produced by Autoeuropa at the Setúbal port, 2019

After the signature of a joint venture agreement between Volkswagen Group and Ford in July 1991, the 2 million m^{2} plant was built in four years, including a surrounding industrial park on which key suppliers are located. The plant and surrounding industrial park cost in total 1.970 M€.

Opened as a 50/50 joint venture, its initial purpose was to assemble a communal-designed MPV model sold under three marques: Volkswagen Sharan, SEAT Alhambra, and Ford Galaxy. Producing these vehicles, Volkswagen Autoeuropa almost reached its production limit of 172,500 units per year.

However, when Ford left the joint venture and the model life-cycle approached its end, Volkswagen took ownership of the plant and production declined considerably. Under Volkswagen's internal bidding system, the plant had to compete for new models with other Volkswagen plants, while threatening to close the plant and to give concessions to the workers and the State.

Eventually, AutoEuropa won the production rights of the new convertible/coupé-only Volkswagen Eos from late 2005, producing just 79,896 vehicles of the original models plus the Eos. In 2008 the plant started production of the third generation Volkswagen Scirocco, and presently employs 3,000 people on site, 2,350 supplier jobs on the industrial park, and an additional 3,750 supplier jobs within Portugal.

As the existing models come to the end of their life cycles, the plant will need to compete for new models from 2010 onwards. It was proposed that in 2009 to prepare the production line for the replacement, although the Great Recession delayed that model.

On July 1, 2013, car number 2,000,000 rolled off the assembly line, a Volkswagen Sharan 2.0 TDI Highline.

In December 2016, the plant won the production rights for the new compact crossover, Volkswagen T-Roc.

In March 2020, SEAT Alhambra is discontinued, and was followed in October 2022 by the final Sharan leaving the assembly line, leaving the T-Roc as the main product.

Autoeuropa was selected for the production of the 2025 hybrid replacement to the T-Roc and will attract €600 million investment from Volkswagen.

On March 11, 2025, Volkswagen Autoeuropa announced it had been selected as a production site for the upcoming Volkswagen ID.1 from 2027 onwards.

== Production ==
Year	1995	1996	1997	1998	1999	2000	2001	2002	2003	2004
Production	41,201	119,042	131,400	138,890	137,267	126,191	136,758	130,007	109,647	95,660
Year	2005	2006	2007	2008	2009	2010	2011	2012	2013	2014
Production	79,896	81,835	93,609	94,100	86,008	101,284	133,100	112,550	91,200	102,240
Year	2015	2016	2017	2018	2019	2020	2021	2022	-	-
Production	102,158	85,126	110,256	287,024	254,600	192,000	-	231,100	-	-

== Production by model ==
Year	Total	Volkswagen Eos	Volkswagen Scirocco	Volkswagen Sharan/SEAT Alhambra
2007	93,609	55,560	-	38,049
2008	94,100	43,534	20,472	29,897

Year	Total	Volkswagen Eos	Volkswagen Scirocco	Volkswagen Sharan	SEAT Alhambra	Volkswagen T-Roc
2012	112,550	11,138	33,620	48,399	19,393	-
2013	91,200	7,651	23,400	40,159	19,990	-
2014	102,240	6,557	23,573	49,498	22,612	-
2015	102,158	4,559	16,251	53,423	27,925	-
2016	85,126	-	11,963	41,949	31,214	-
2017	110,256	-	8,199	45,695	33,638	22,724
2018	287,024	-	-	30,459	19,588	236,977
2019	254,600	-	-	25,681	23,015	205,904
2020	192,000	-	-	-	-	192,000
2021	-	-	-	-	-	-
2022	231,100	-	-	-	-	231,100

== Current production ==
- Volkswagen T-Roc (Nov, 2017–present)

== Former production ==
- Ford Galaxy Mk1 (May, 1995 - Feb, 2006)
- SEAT Alhambra Mk1 (1996 - 2010)
- Volkswagen Sharan Mk1 (May, 1995 - 2010)
- Volkswagen Eos (2006 - Jun, 2015)
- Volkswagen Scirocco Mk3 (Jun, 2008 - Oct, 2017)
- SEAT Alhambra Mk2 (2010 - 2020)
- Volkswagen Sharan Mk2 (2010 - 2022)
