= Volkswagen Eos =

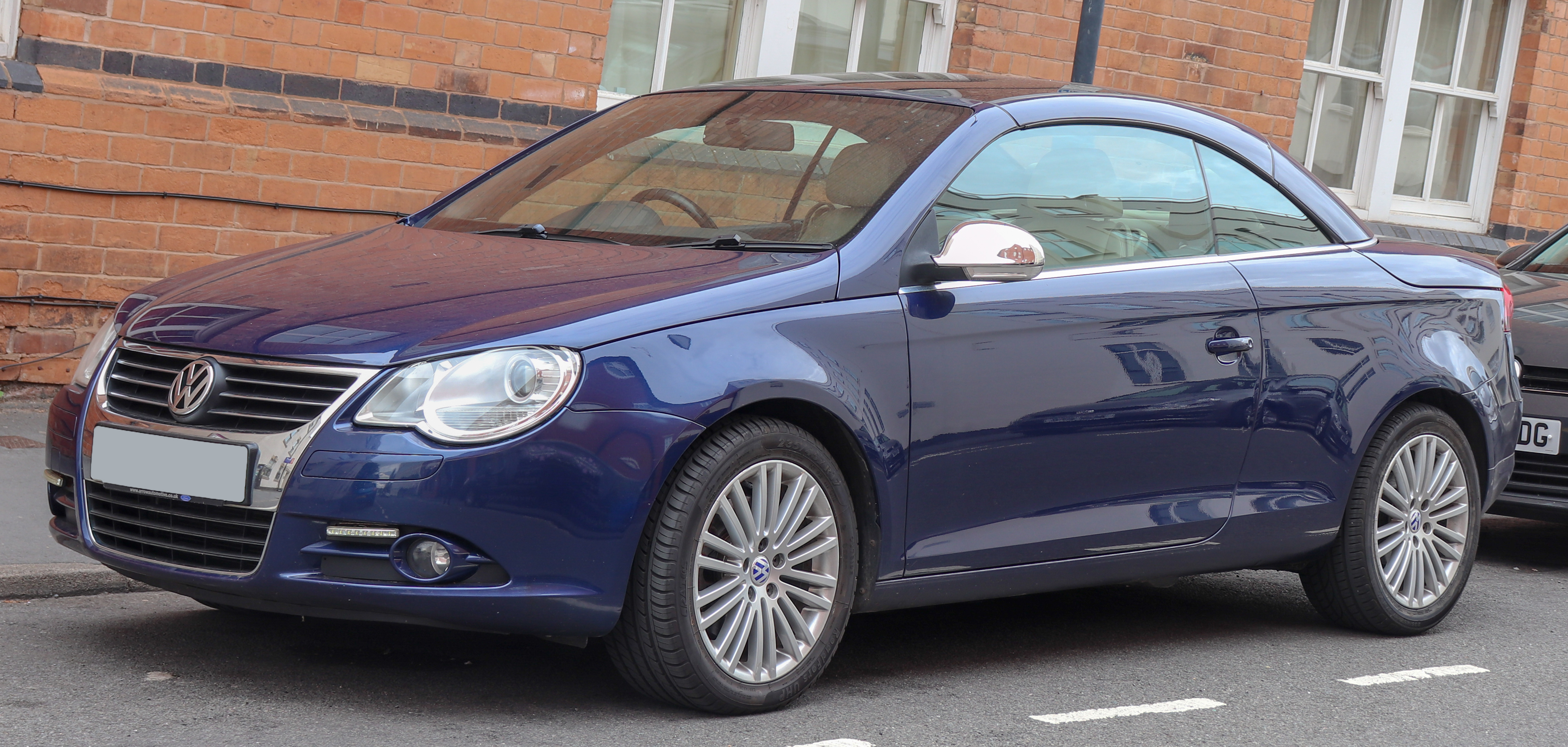

Overview
- Manufacturer: Volkswagen
- Production: 2006–2016
- Assembly: Portugal: Palmela (Autoeuropa)
- Designer: Robert Lešnik under the direction of Peter Schreyer

Body and chassis
- Class: Sport compact (S)
- Body style: 2-door coupé convertible
- Layout: Transverse front-engine, front-wheel-drive
- Platform: Volkswagen Group A5 platform
- Related: Volkswagen Golf Mk5; Volkswagen Scirocco Mk3; Audi A3 Mk2; Audi TT Mk2; Škoda Octavia Mk2; SEAT León Mk2

Powertrain
- Engine: 1.4 L I4 (petrol); 1.6 L I4 (petrol); 2.0 L I4 (petrol); 3.2 L VR6 (petrol); 3.6 L VR6 (petrol); 2.0 L I4 TDI
- Transmission: 6-speed manual 6-speed automatic (DSG)

Dimensions
- Wheelbase: 2,578 mm (101.5 in)
- Length: 2007–2009: 4,407 mm (173.5 in); 2010–2011: 4,409 mm (173.6 in); 2012–2016: 4,422 mm (174.1 in)
- Width: 1,791 mm (70.5 in)
- Height: 1,443 mm (56.8 in)

The Volkswagen Eos is a compact car manufactured and marketed by Volkswagen from 2006 to 2016. It is a two-door convertible which seats four passengers. The Eos has a five-section hardtop retractable roof which itself featured an independently operable glass sunroof. VW marketed the body configuration as a CSC (coupe-sunroof-convertible).

Assembled at AutoEuropa in Portugal, the Eos succeeded the Golf Cabriolet. Eos production ended in May 2015, with a limited number of base trim models marketed as 2016 models in the United States.

The model name derived from Eos, the Greek goddess of the dawn.

== History ==
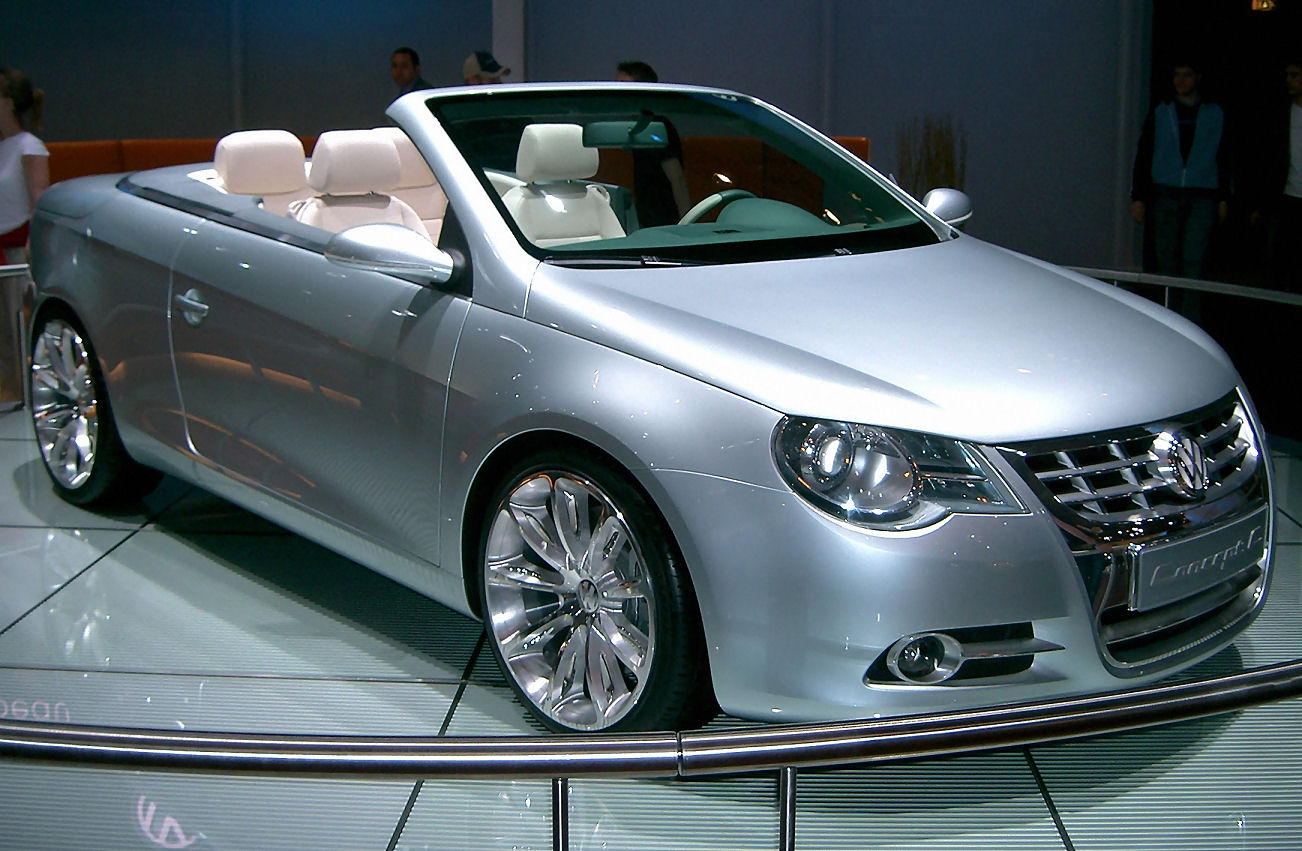
2004 Concept C

Prior to production, the Eos was shown as the Concept C at the 2004 Geneva Motor Show — designed by a team headed by Peter Schreyer, Head of Volkswagen Design in Wolfsburg. Other sources attribute the design of the Eos specifically to Slovenian Robert Lešnik.

The production Eos, manufactured at the AutoEuropa plant in Portugal, was presented in September 2005, at the Frankfurt Motor Show, with the North American introduction at the Los Angeles Auto Show in January 2006.

Unlike the Cabrio, which was a convertible version of the Golf hatchback, the Eos was a standalone model with all new body panels, sharing its platform and components with the Volkswagen Golf (Mk5).

== Roof design ==
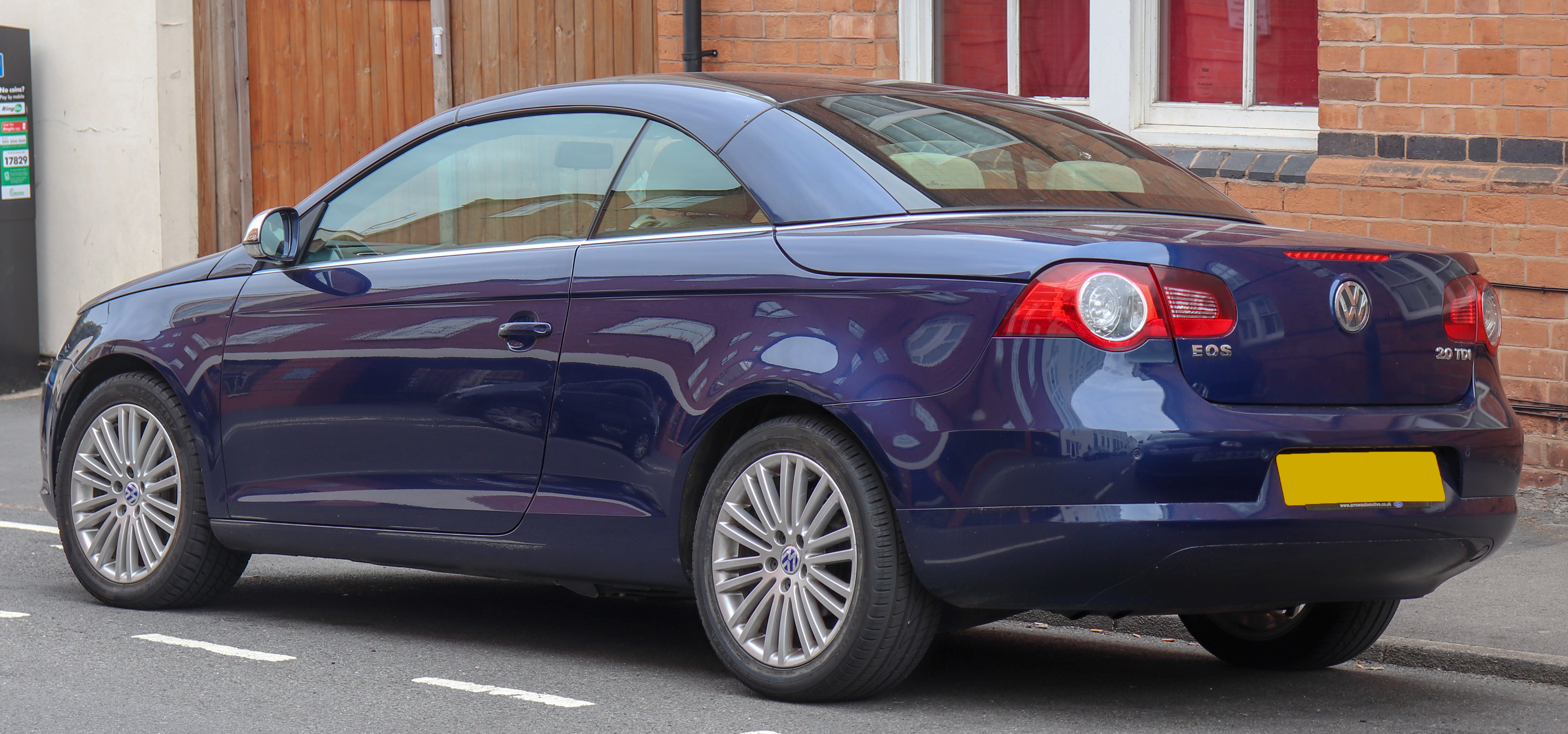
Volkswagen Eos 2.0 TDI (pre facelift)

The Eos uses a five-piece folding roof with an integrated, independently operating glass sunroof — making the Eos the only retractable hardtop of this kind. The roof folds automatically into the trunk in twenty five seconds, reducing trunk space from 10.5 to 6.6 cubic feet (300 to 190 L).

The roof, designed and manufactured by OASys, a subsidiary of Webasto Germany, uses its own hydraulic control system and numerous rubber seals. Periodic maintenance is required so seals remain conditioned and functional.

Early Eos models had a leak-prone seal design, subsequently updated in the 2009/2010 timeframe. Proper body alignment is critical for proper top function.

== Facelift ==
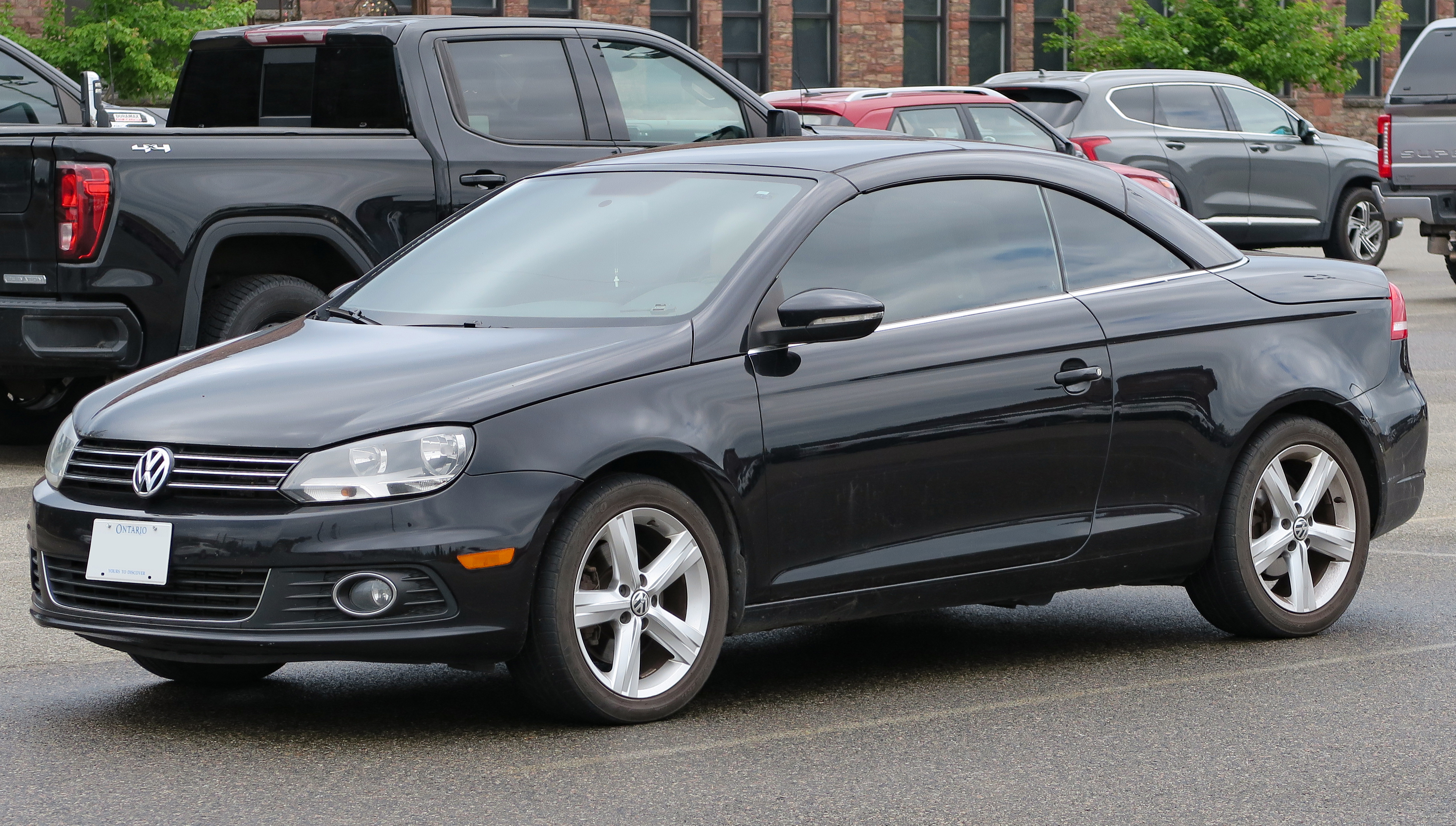
Volkswagen Eos (facelift)

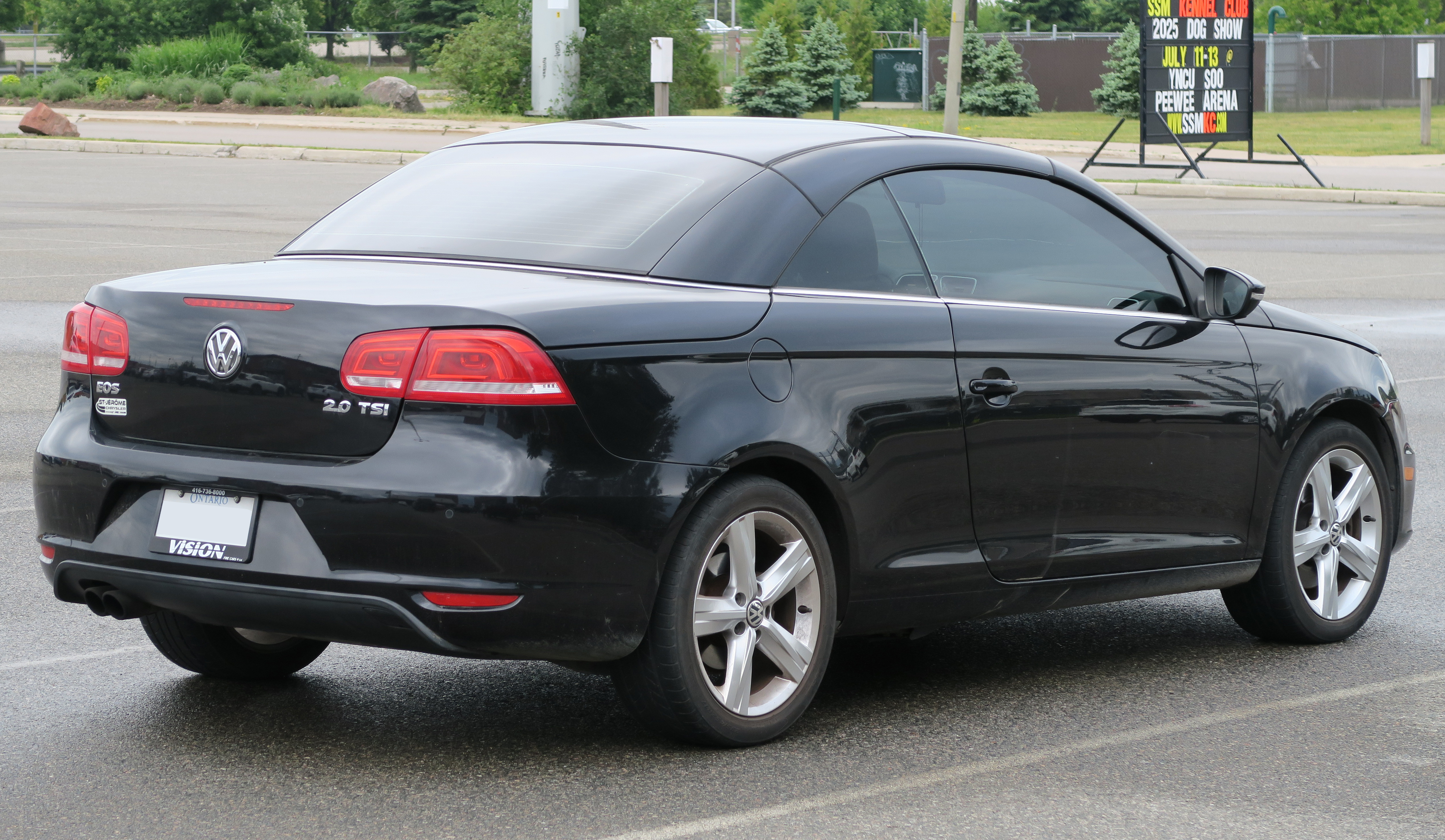
Volkswagen Eos (facelift)

A facelifted Volkswagen Eos appeared in October 2010, and went on sale as a model of 2012 outside Europe. This facelift includes a revised front and rear fascias, headlights and tail lights, side mirrors, as well as new wheel designs.

== Eos White Night ==
The White Night edition featured a black interior, white exterior paint, black painted roof, LED tail lights, and 18 inch Budapest wheels.

Other features include black mirror covers, radiator grille and trim strips, black Nappa leather seats, door and side trim and black steering wheel with contrasting seams, trim strips and radio trim in candy white, sill panel strips with white night letters. Other features include automatic climate control, sports chassis lowered 15 mm (0.6 in) and heated front seats. The option was available with all non V6 models.

== United States Final Edition ==
Sales of the Eos steadily declined, and by 2014 had become one of the VW last models using the Mark 5 platform.

During 2014, Volkswagen announced the Eos' discontinuation with close of model year 2015, marked by a Final Edition trim level.

The 2015-only Final Edition trim replaced the Sport trim marketed in the US and included Sport trim features along with a two tone beige/black leather upholstery, back up camera and park distance control — and three available paint colors: black, brown and white.

== 2016 United States ==
In August 2015, Volkswagen announced a limited run of Eos models of 2016 in Komfort trim only. In October 2015, at least one dealer was quoted as saying only 1,300 cars were made available for the United States in four colours: black, brown, red and white. Since 2014, the Komfort trim included a high level of standard features as well as in-dash navigation.

== Drivetrain ==
Model	Year(s)	Engine	Power, torque@rpm	Transmission	Emission standards
1.4 TSI	2007–2016	1,390 cc (1.39 L; 85 cu in) I4 turbo	122 PS (90 kW; 120 hp)@5500, 200 N⋅m (148 lb⋅ft)@1500-4000	6 speed manual	Euro 5
1.4 TSI	2008–2014	1,390 cc (1.39 L; 85 cu in) I4 turbo	160 PS (118 kW; 158 hp)@5800, 240 N⋅m (177 lb⋅ft)@1500-4500	6 speed manual	Euro 5
1.6 FSI	2006–2007	1,598 cc (1.598 L; 97.5 cu in) I4	115 PS (85 kW; 113 hp)@6000, 155 N⋅m (114 lb⋅ft)@4000	6 speed manual	Euro 4
2.0 FSI	2006–2008	1,984 cc (1.984 L; 121.1 cu in) I4	150 PS (110 kW; 148 hp)@6000, 200 N⋅m (148 lb⋅ft)@3500	6 speed manual	Euro 4
2.0 TSI	2006–2016	1,984 cc (1.984 L; 121.1 cu in) I4 turbo	200 PS (147 kW; 197 hp)@5500, 280 N⋅m (207 lb⋅ft)@1800-5000	6 speed manual, 6 speed DSG (optional)	Euro 4
2.0 TSI	2011–2014	1,984 cc (1.984 L; 121.1 cu in) I4 turbo	210 PS (154 kW; 207 hp)@5300-6200, 280 N⋅m (207 lb⋅ft)@1700-5200	6 speed manual, 6 speed DSG (optional)	Euro 5
3.2 VR6	2006–2008	3,189 cc (3.189 L; 194.6 cu in) V6	250 PS (184 kW; 247 hp)@6300, 320 N⋅m (236 lb⋅ft)@2500-3000	6 speed DSG	Euro 4
3.6 VR6	2009–2011	3,597 cc (3.597 L; 219.5 cu in) V6	260 PS (191 kW; 256 hp)@6000, 350 N⋅m (258 lb⋅ft)@2400-4000	6 speed DSG	Euro 5
2.0 TDI	2006–2008	1,968 cc (1.968 L; 120.1 cu in) I4 Pumpe Düse turbo diesel Engine Code: BMM	140 PS (103 kW; 138 hp)@4200, 320 N⋅m (236 lb⋅ft)@1750-2500	6 speed manual, 6 speed DSG (optional)	Euro 4
2.0 TDI	2008–2014	1,968 cc (1.968 L; 120.1 cu in) I4 common rail turbo diesel Engine Code: CBAB	140 PS (103 kW; 138 hp)@4200, 320 N⋅m (236 lb⋅ft)@1750-2500	6 speed manual, 6 speed DSG (optional)	Euro 5

== International markets ==
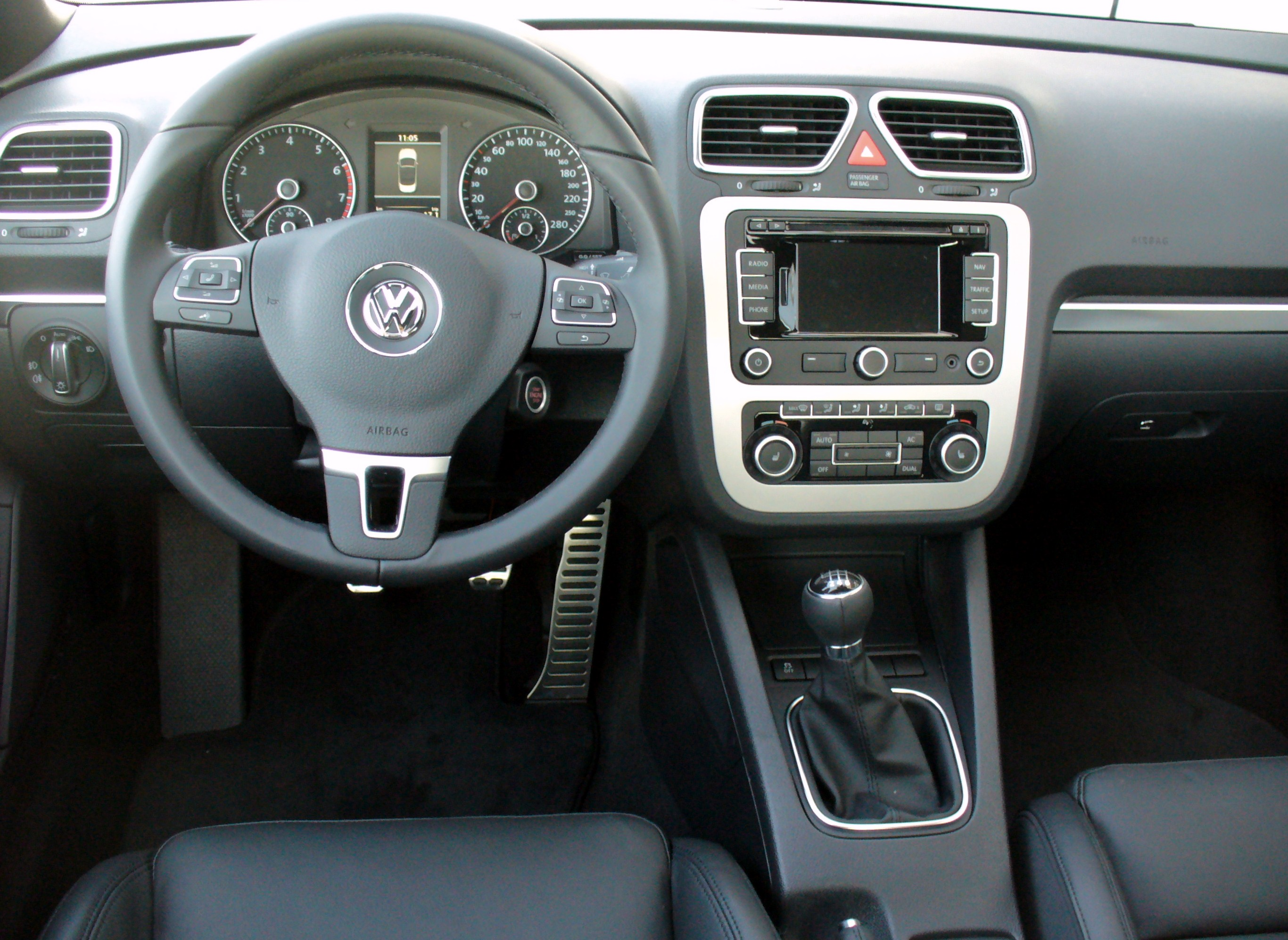
European market Eos (interior)

The Eos was released in Europe in the first quarter of 2006, and in North America in the third quarter of 2006. Right hand drive markets, such as Japan, began sales in October 2006, followed by New Zealand and Australia in January 2007. It was released in South Africa in the second quarter of 2007.

== Safety ==
ANCAP test results Volkswagen Eos variant(s) as tested (2007)
Test	Score
Overall	4 /5 stars
Frontal offset	12.35/16
Side impact	16/16
Pole	1/2
Seat belt reminders	2/3
Whiplash protection	Not Assessed
Pedestrian protection	Marginal
Electronic stability control	Standard

== Production ==
Year	Global
2006	39,437
2007	55,560
2008	43,578
2009	17,880
2010	22,775
2011	22,511
2012	11,138
2013	7,651
2014	6,567
2015	4,559
Total	231,863
