= 201st =

201st may refer to:

== Military ==
- 201st Division (disambiguation)
- 201st Brigade (disambiguation)
- 201st Regiment (disambiguation)
- 201st Squadron (disambiguation)
- 201st Guards Military Base, Russia
- 201st Schutzmannschaft Battalion
- 201st Battalion (Toronto Light Infantry), CEF
- 201st (Infantry) Battalion, Training Reserve
- 201st (Cornwall) Medium Battery, Royal Garrison Artillery
- 201st Heavy Battery, Royal Garrison Artillery
- 201st (Hertfordshire and Bedfordshire Yeomanry) Parachute Battery, Royal Artillery
- 201st (East Lancashire) Field Battery, Royal Artillery
- 201st (East Lancashire) Field Company, Royal Engineers
- 201st Combat Communications Group, United States
- 201st Corps (Afghanistan)
- 201st Regional Support Group, United States

== Other uses ==
- 201st New York State Legislature
- Pennsylvania's 201st Representative District
- Ukraine's 201st electoral district
- 201st Street (Manhattan)

== See also ==
- 201, the year 201 (CC) of the Julian calendar
- 201 BC
- 201 (number)
- 201 (disambiguation)
