= 201st Regiment =

201st Regiment may refer to:

- 201st Field Artillery Regiment, United States
- 201st Motorized Artillery Regiment, Italy
- 201st Pennsylvania Infantry Regiment, Union Army, American Civil War

== See also ==
- 201st Division (disambiguation)
- 201st Brigade (disambiguation)
