= C201 =

C201 or variant, may refer to:

== Vehicles ==
- CASA C-201 Alcotán, a transport airplane
- Centrair 201 Marianne (C 201), a training sailplane glider
- CIÉ 201 Class locomotive C201
- SpaceX Dragon 2 DragonFly (C201), a prototype SpaceX Dragon space capsule used for self-propelled landings

== Other uses ==
- C-201 missile, a model of the HY-series Silkworm (missile)
- BBC Radio One, with the programme identification PI-code of "C201"
- Bwenyi language (Guthrie code C.201), a Bantu language of Africa
- Motorola C201, a cellphone; see List of Motorola Mobility products
- Nokia C2-01. a cellphone
- Old Grassy Road (C201). Tasmania, Australia; see List of road routes in Tasmania

== See also ==
- 201 (disambiguation)
- C (disambiguation)
