= Volkswagen CC =

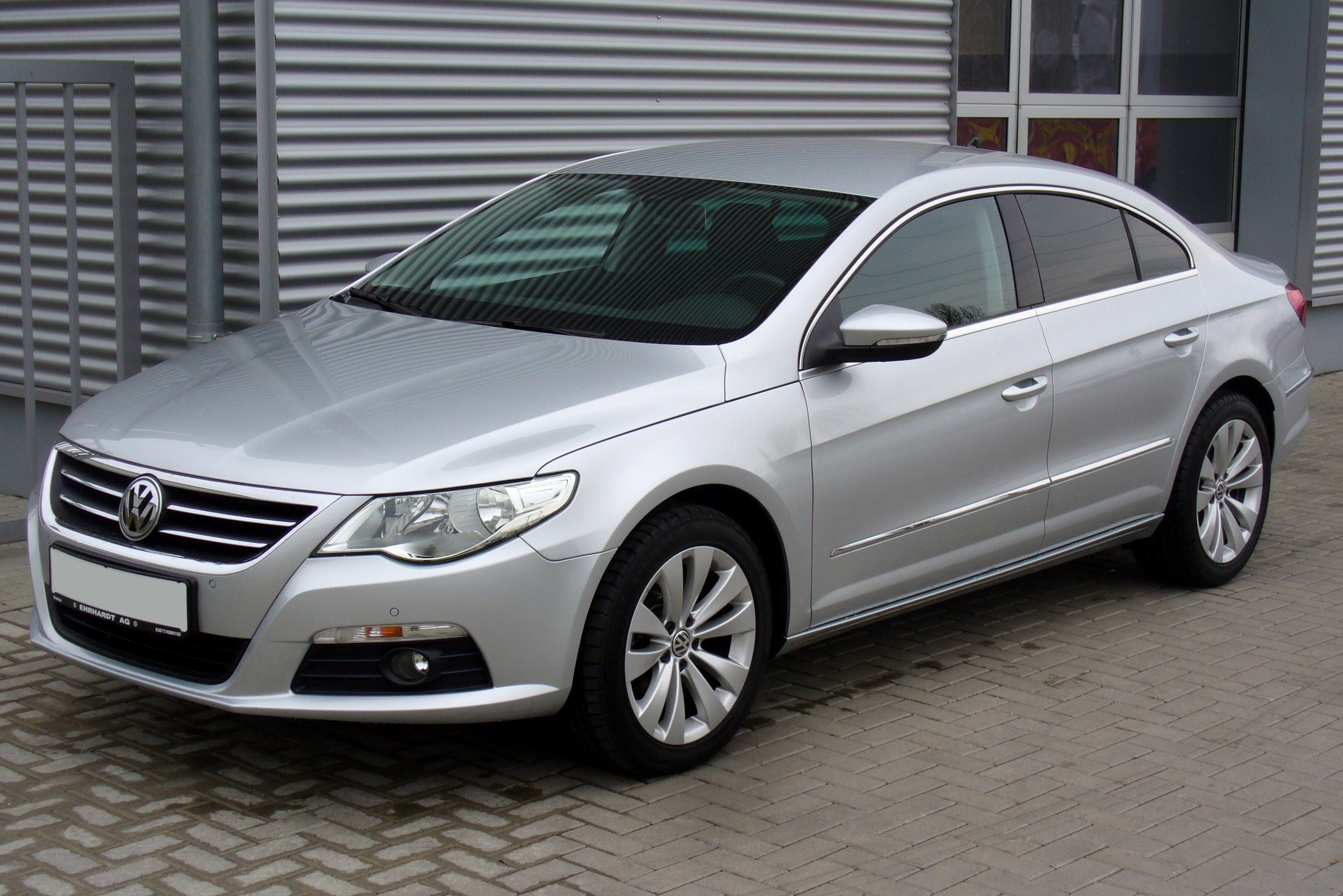

Overview
- Manufacturer: Volkswagen
- Also called: Volkswagen Passat CC
- Production: 2008–2016; 2010–2018 (China)
- Model years: 2009–2017
- Assembly: Germany: Emden (Emden plant); China: Changchun (FAW-VW); Russia: Kaluga (Volkswagen Group Rus)
- Designer: Oliver Stefan

Body and chassis
- Class: Compact executive car (D)
- Body style: 4-door sedan
- Layout: Front engine, front-wheel drive / 4motion on-demand four-wheel drive
- Platform: Volkswagen Group A6 (PQ46)
- Related: Volkswagen Passat; Volkswagen Sharan; SEAT Alhambra; Škoda Superb

Powertrain
- Engine: 1.4 L TSI I4; 1.8 L TSI I4; 2.0 L TSI I4; 3.6 L VR6; 2.0 L TDI I4
- Transmission: 6-speed manual 6-speed automatic 6-speed DSG; 7-speed DSG

Dimensions
- Wheelbase: 106.7 in (2,710 mm)
- Length: 188.9 in (4,798 mm)
- Width: 73.1 in (1,857 mm)
- Height: 56.0 in (1,422 mm)

Chronology
- Successor: Volkswagen Arteon

The Volkswagen CC, initially sold as the Volkswagen Passat CC, is a car built by German marque Volkswagen from 2008 to 2016. It is a variant of the Volkswagen Passat that trades headroom and cargo space for a coupé-like profile and sweeping roofline. The CC debuted in January 2008, at the North American International Auto Show in Detroit and was discontinued after the 2017 model year.

Volkswagen said the name CC stands for Comfort Coupe, recognizing its combination of a coupe-like profile with four rather than two doors. While based on the Passat, and sharing its wheelbase, the CC is 27 mm (1.06 inches) longer, 50 mm (1.97 inches) lower, and 36 mm (1.42 inches) wider than the Passat.

While the CC has been replaced by the Arteon in most markets, the latter vehicle retains the CC nameplate in China.

== Market launch ==
At its launch in 2008, Volkswagen forecast 300,000 sales over a period of seven years. The automaker expected that 60% of these sales (about 26,000 units per year) will come from the market of the United States. In China, the CC was released by FAW-Volkswagen on July 15, 2010, and was available in 1.8TSI and 2.0TSI trims.

Compared to other midsize sedans in the marketplace, the 2013 Volkswagen CC was evaluated by Edmunds as "attractive and higher quality alternative ... though its smallish backseat and trunk may be deal-breakers ... [and] the sport tuned suspension is on the firm side." Automotive journalists describe the CC sedan's ride as "nearly sports car firm, with every bump and undulation sent directly to your backside."

== Specifications ==
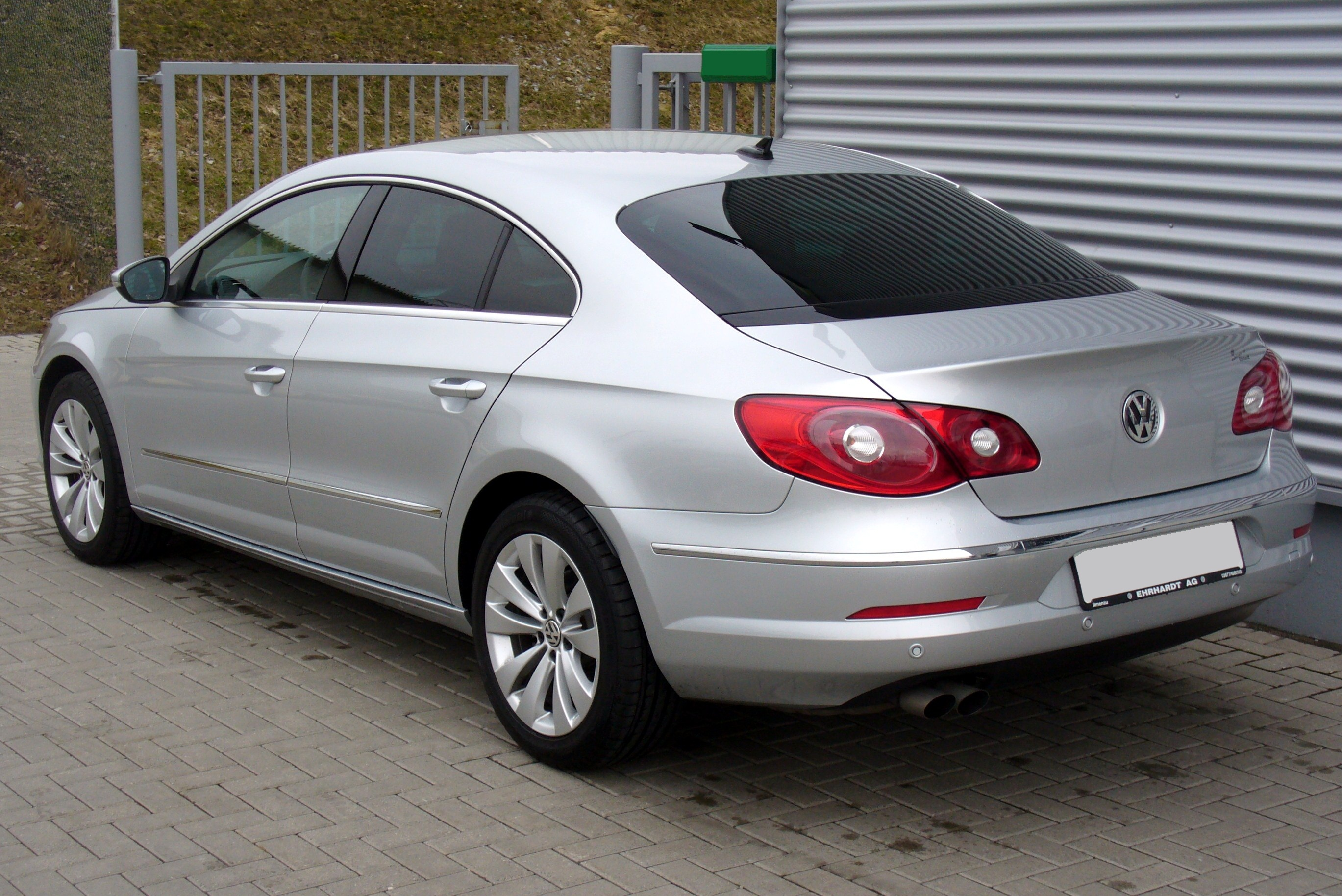
Rear

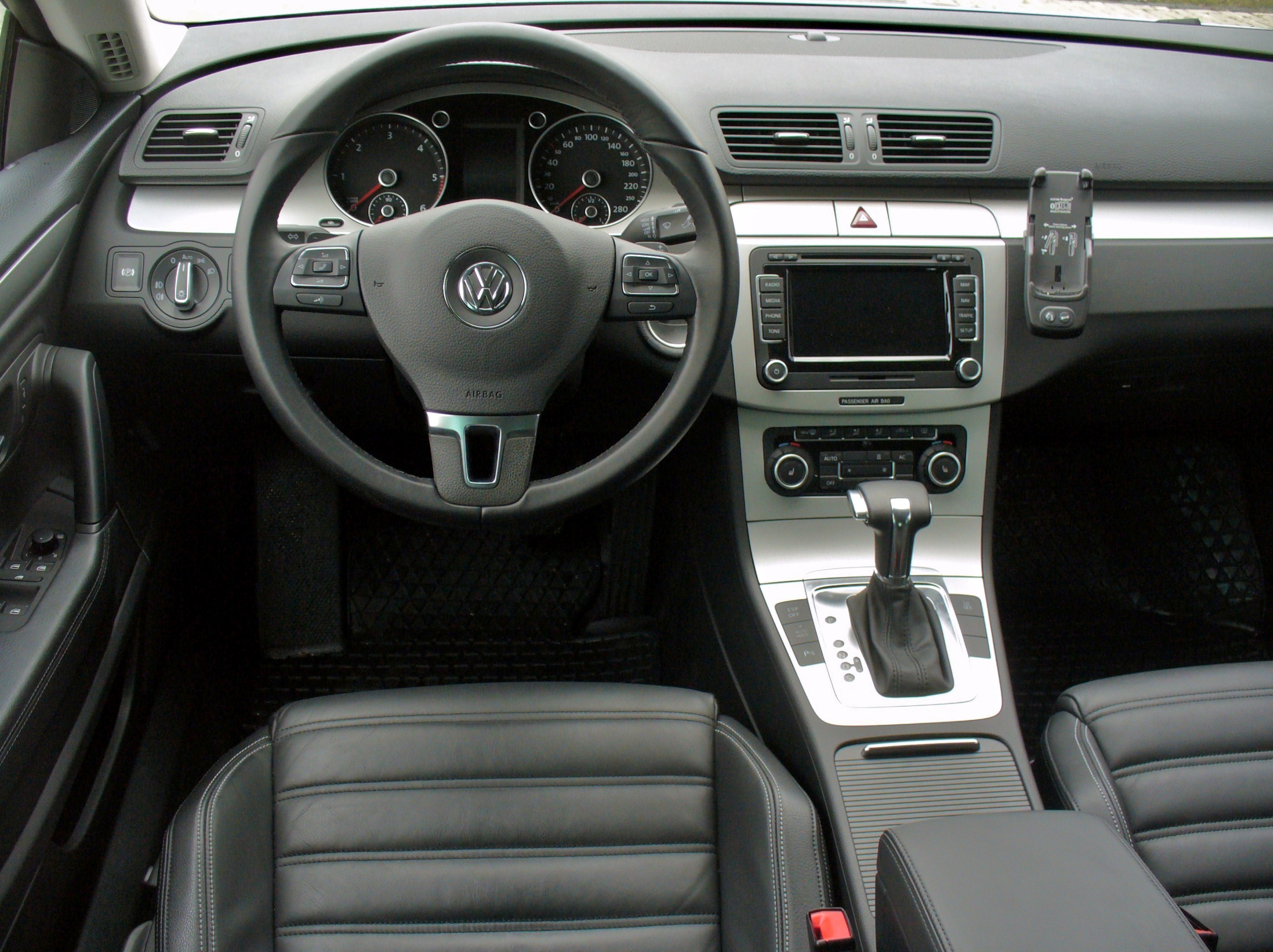
Interior

The car has a 2,710 mm (106.7 in) wheelbase and was available with a 1.4 L E85 TFSI (Finland and Sweden), 1.8 L petrol inline-four, 2.0 L petrol inline four, a 2.0 L inline four TDI engine in various drivetrain configurations, as well as with a 3.6 L VR6 engine producing 220 kW (299 PS; 295 hp) with 4motion four-wheel drive and a six speed Direct-Shift Gearbox transmission.

The North American market had the 2.0T I4 and 3.6 L VR6 engine as options. This version of the VR6 engine produced 206 kW (276 hp) and 265 lb⋅ft (359 N⋅m) of torque in both front wheel drive and 4MOTION versions, while the 2.0T produced 200 hp (149 kW) and 207 lb⋅ft (281 N⋅m). Manual transmission was available in the 2.0T engine option only. It also came with automatic transmission.

On the European market, the CC was offered with 4MOTION four-wheel-drive on the 2.0 L TDI engines. The 103 kW (140 PS) model came with manual transmission and the 125 kW (170 PS) model with Direct-Shift Gearbox (DSG). An AdBlue version offering 105 kW (143 PS) named BlueTDI was also produced. Availability varied by national markets.

For the 2011 model year, the 2.0T in Europe was upgraded to 155 kW (211 PS; 208 hp) by using the engine variant introduced in the Golf VI GTI.

Models	1.4L TSI	1.8L TSI	2.0L TSI	2.0L TSI	2.0L TDI	2.0L TDI	3.6L 4motion
Produced	2011–	2008–	2008–	2011–	2008–	2008–	2008–
Powertrain
Engine	turbo inline 4-cylinder petrol/E85	turbo inline 4-cylinder petrol (1.8 TFSI EA888)	turbo inline 4-cylinder petrol (2.0 TFSI EA888)		turbo inline 4-cylinder diesel (2.0 TDI CR)		V6 petrol (3.6 VR6 FSI 220 kW)
Max. power @ rpm	160 PS (118 kW; 158 hp) @ 5,000–6,200	160 PS (118 kW; 158 hp) @ 4,500–6,000	200 PS (147 kW; 197 hp) @ 5,100–6,000	211 PS (155 kW; 208 hp) @ 5,300–6,200	140 PS (103 kW; 138 hp) @ 4,200	170 PS (125 kW; 168 hp) @ 4,200	299 PS (220 kW; 295 hp) @ 6,600
Max. torque @ rpm	240 N⋅m (177 lb⋅ft) @ 2,000	250 N⋅m (184 lb⋅ft) @ 1,500–4,500	280 N⋅m (207 lb⋅ft) @ 1,700–5,000	280 N⋅m (207 lb⋅ft) @ 1,700–5,200	320 N⋅m (236 lb⋅ft) @ 1,750–2,500	350 N⋅m (258 lb⋅ft) @ 1,750–2,500	350 N⋅m (258 lb⋅ft) @ 2,400–5,300
Transmission	6-speed manual, 7-speed Direct-Shift Gearbox	6-speed manual, 7-speed Direct-Shift Gearbox	6-speed manual, 6-speed Tiptronic 2008–2009, 6-speed Direct-Shift Gearbox late 2009–	6-speed manual, 6-speed Direct-Shift Gearbox	6-speed manual, 6-speed Direct-Shift Gearbox	6-speed manual, 6-speed Direct-Shift Gearbox	6-speed Direct-Shift Gearbox
Handling
Front suspension	MacPherson struts, wishbones, coil springs, direct-acting telescopic dampers						
Rear suspension	Multi-link axle, coil springs, direct-acting telescopic dampers						
Braking system	Disc brakes all around (Ø 310 mm (12.20 in) front, 285 mm (11.22 in) rear), Bosch 8.0 ESP with ABS, EBD, BA, EDL, ASR						
Steering	Rack and pinion steering, electrically assisted (maintenance-free)						
Body structure	Sheet steel, monocoque (unibody) construction, front and rear subframes						
Dry weight (manual/automatic)	na/na	1,430 kg (3,153 lb)/na	1,441 kg (3,177 lb)/1,454 kg (3,206 lb)	1,513 kg (3,336 lb)/1,535 kg (3,384 lb)	1,466 kg (3,232 lb)/1,485 kg (3,274 lb)	na/1,656 kg (3,651 lb) (tare mass)	na/1,632 kg (3,598 lb)
Loaded (gross) weight (manual/automatic)	1,950 kg (4,299 lb)/1,960 kg (4,321 lb)	1,920 kg (4,233 lb)/na	1,950 kg (4,299 lb)/1,970 kg (4,343 lb)	1,980 kg (4,365 lb)/1,990 kg (4,387 lb)	1,960 kg (4,321 lb)/1,980 kg (4,365 lb)	na/na	na/2,110 kg (4,652 lb)
Track (front/rear)	1,552 mm (61.1 in) / 1,559 mm (61.4 in)						
Wheelbase	2,711 mm (106.73 in)						
Length	4,799 mm (188.94 in)						
Width	1,855 mm (73.03 in)						
Height	1,417 mm (55.79 in)						
Top speed (manual/auto)	222 km/h (137.9 mph)/222 km/h (137.9 mph)	222 km/h (137.9 mph)/220 km/h (136.7 mph)	237 km/h (147.3 mph)/232 km/h (144.2 mph)/DSG 235 km/h (146.0 mph)	240 km/h (149.1 mph)//DSG 238 km/h (147.9 mph)	213 km/h (132.4 mph)/210 km/h (130.5 mph)	227 km/h (141.1 mph)/224 km/h (139.2 mph)	250 km/h (155.3 mph) (electronically limited)
0–100 km/h (0–62 mph) (sec) (manual/auto)	-	-	-	-	-	-	na/5.6
CO₂ emissions (g/km) (manual/auto)	161/159	172/169	186/199	171/182	146/158	146/159	na/242-254

=== Facelift ===
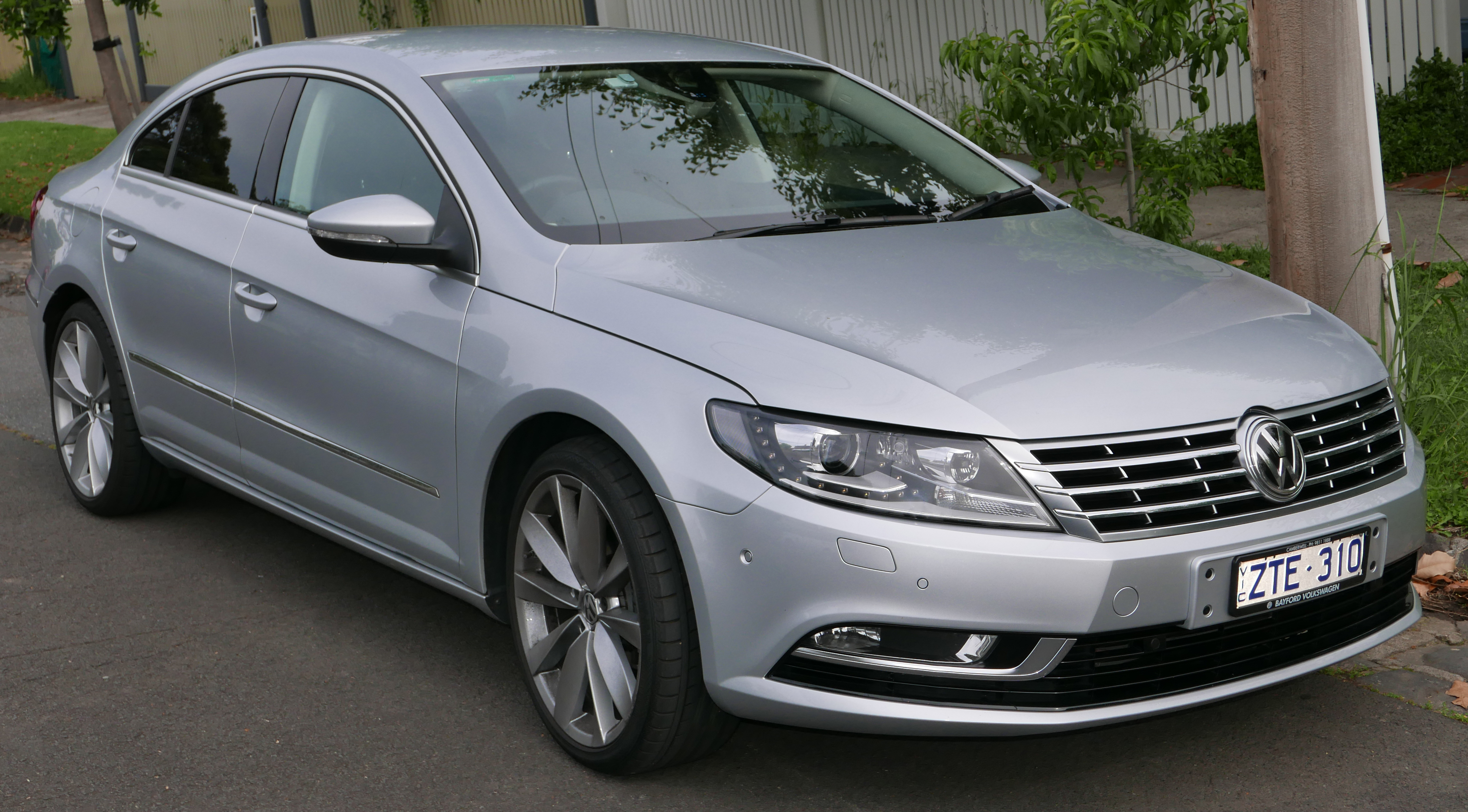
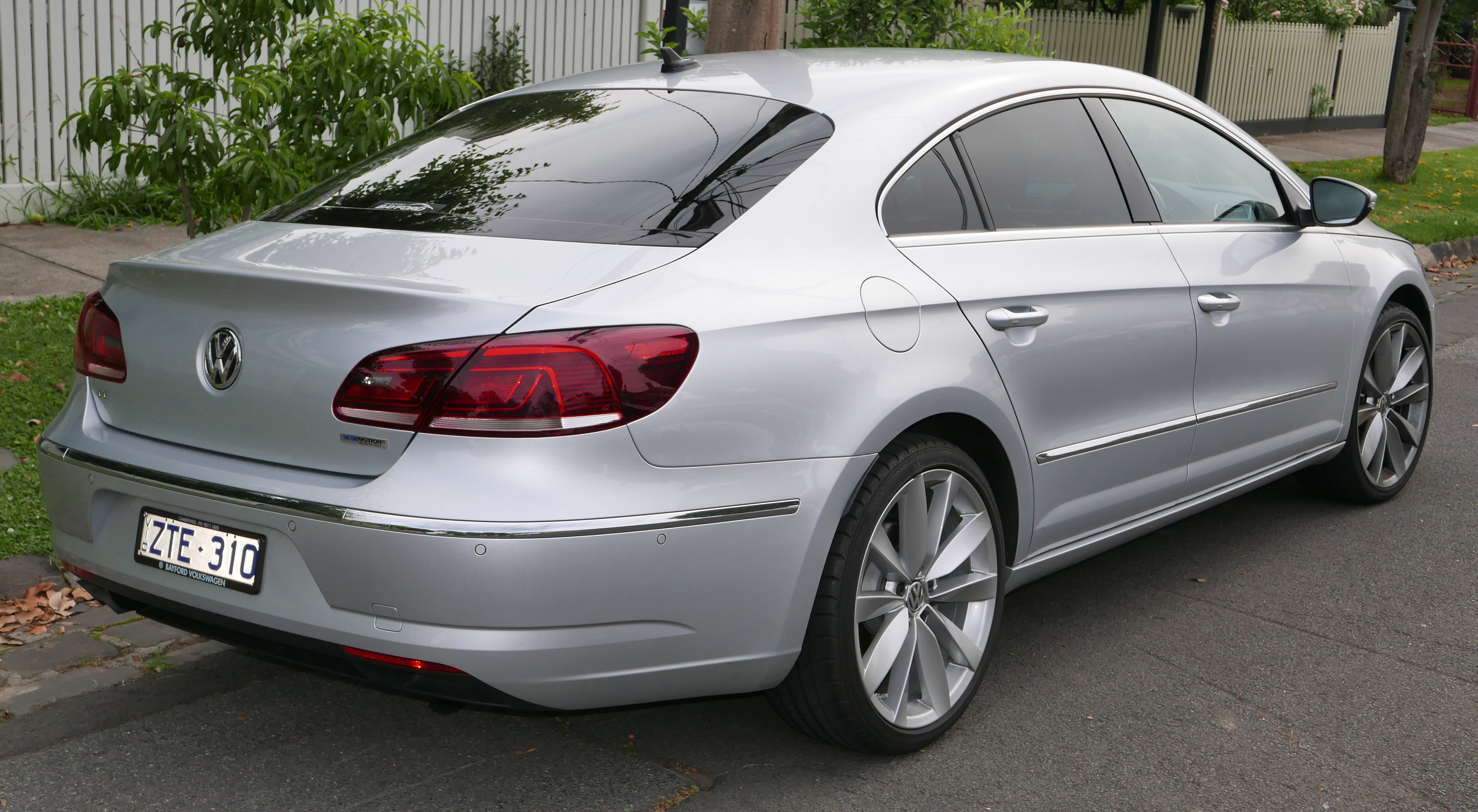
VW CC Facelift (2012–2017)

A facelift to the CC was presented at the LA Auto Show, and production started in January 2012. The front and rear were revised to make the CC look similar to the then current Volkswagen design, while the midsection was unchanged. Interior changes included minor updates to the center console along with an updated A/C control panel. This design was also used in the Passat Alltrack.

Features included:

- improved Adaptive Chassis Control (DCC)
- Bi-Xenon headlights with Advanced Front-Lighting System (AFS) curve lights and Dynamic Light Assist glare-free high beams
- fatigue detection system
- Front Assist with "city emergency braking" system
- Side Assist Plus
- Lane Assist
- Rear Assist
- Park Assist
- Traffic sign recognition
- Easy Open

European engine options remain the same as for the 2011 Passat CC. Transmission options were carried over from the previous version, but the diesel automatic transmission now has with a free wheel function that is claimed to reduce fuel consumption by disengaging the clutch, when the driver lifts their foot from the accelerator.

The XDS electronic differential brake that was also used in the Golf GTI was available on the CC as standard or optional equipment. Initially available only in V6 as an AWD alternative, but diesel versions became available during 2012. Availability of diesel 4WD varied by market.

In January 2013, the optional 2.0 TDI 170 PS (125 kW; 168 hp) was replaced by an uprated version with 177 PS (130 kW; 175 hp). The torque increased from 350 to 380 N⋅m (258 to 280 lbf⋅ft). In 2015, this was again uprated to 184 PS (135 kW; 181 hp), this time from the new EA288 engine complying with the Euro 6 emissions standard that replaced the previous EA189. Maximum torque remained at 380 N⋅m (280 lbf⋅ft). The 140 PS (103 kW; 138 hp) was uprated to 150 PS (110 kW; 148 hp).

Models	1.4L TSI	1.8L TSI	2.0L TSI	2.0L TDI	2.0L TDI110 kW	2.0L TDI 127 kW	2.0L TDI 132 kW	2.0L TDI 135 kW	3.6L 4motion
Produced	2012–2018	2012–2018	2012–2018	2012–2018	2015–2016	2012–2013	2013–2015	2015–2016	2012–2016
Powertrain
Engine	turbo inline 4-cylinder petrol/E85	turbo inline 4-cylinder petrol (1.8 TFSI EA888)	turbo inline 4-cylinder petrol (2.0 TFSI EA888)	turbo inline 4-cylinder diesel (2.0 TDI CR EA189)	turbo inline 4-cylinder diesel (2.0 TDI CR EA288)	turbo inline 4-cylinder diesel (2.0 TDI CR EA189)		turbo inline 4-cylinder diesel (2.0 TDI CR EA288)	V6 petrol (3.6 VR6 FSI 220 kW)
Max. power @ rpm	160 PS (118 kW; 158 hp) @ 5,000–6,200	160 PS (118 kW; 158 hp) @ 5,000–6,200	211 PS (155 kW; 208 hp) @ 5,300–6,200	140 PS (103 kW; 138 hp) @ 4,200	150 PS (110 kW; 148 hp) @ 3,500-4,000	170 PS (125 kW; 168 hp) @ 4,200	177 PS (130 kW; 175 hp) @ 4,200	184 PS (135 kW; 181 hp) @ 4,000	299 PS (220 kW; 295 hp) @ 6,600
Max. torque @ rpm	240 N⋅m (177 lb⋅ft) @ 2,000	250 N⋅m (184 lb⋅ft) @ 1,500–4,200	280 N⋅m (207 lb⋅ft) @ 1,700–5,200	320 N⋅m (236 lb⋅ft) @ 1,750–2,500	340 N⋅m (251 lb⋅ft) @ 1,750–3,000	350 N⋅m (258 lb⋅ft) @ 1,750–2,500	380 N⋅m (280 lb⋅ft) @ 1,750–2,500	380 N⋅m (280 lb⋅ft) @ 1,750–3,250	350 N⋅m (258 lb⋅ft) @ 2,400–5,300
Transmission	6-speed manual, 7-speed Direct-shift gearbox	6-speed manual, 7-speed Direct-shift gearbox	6-speed manual, 6-speed Direct-shift gearbox	6-speed manual, 6-speed Direct-shift gearbox	6-speed manual, 6-speed Direct-shift gearbox	6-speed manual, 6-speed Direct-shift gearbox	6-speed manual, 6-speed Direct-shift gearbox	6-speed manual, 6-speed Direct-shift gearbox	6-speed Direct-shift gearbox
Top speed (manual/auto)	222 km/h (137.9 mph)/222 km/h (137.9 mph)/	223 km/h (138.6 mph)/223 km/h (138.6 mph)/	242 km/h (150.4 mph)//DSG 240 km/h (149.1 mph)	214 km/h (133.0 mph)/212 km/h (131.7 mph)	218 km/h (135.5 mph)/218 km/h (135.5 mph)	227 km/h (141.1 mph)/224 km/h (139.2 mph)	227 km/h (141.1 mph)/224 km/h (139.2 mph)	234 km/h (145.4 mph)/232 km/h (144.2 mph)	250 km/h (155.3 mph) (electronically limited)
0–100 km/h (0–62 mph) (sec) (manual/auto)	8.5/8.5	8.6/8.5	6.5/6.5	9.8/9.8	9.1/9.1	8.6/8.6	8.4/8.4	8.1/8.1	na/5.5
CO₂ emissions (g/km) (manual/auto)	161/159	165/167	171/182	125/139	118/127	129/144	125/137	127/130	na/215

The transmission with the V6 in the North American market was a traditional hydraulic automatic transmission, whereas in other markets, it was a DSG transmission.

== Motorsport ==
A specially-prepared CC was raced in the 2013 British Touring Car Championship season and also in later events. Drivers included Warren Scott, Tom Onslow-Cole, and Aiden Moffat.

== Successor ==
With only 3,900 units sold in 2015, the CC was one of the lowest selling models in the Volkswagen range.

During November 2016, Volkswagen announced the Arteon would replace the CC. In May 2017, Volkswagen Australia announced the specifications for its new Arteon to replace the discontinued CC at the top end in the car maker's model line up. China would continue production on the CC name starting in August 2018 for the 2019 model year.

== Yearly sales ==
Calendar year	Global (production)	United States (sales)
2011		29,502
2012	68,481	21,646
2013	88,632	15,672
2014	85,591	9,995
2015	56,796	6,276
2016	44,091	3,237
2017		1,355
2018		455
2019		59
