= RadioDNS =

RadioDNS is an organisation that promotes the use of open technology standards to enable hybrid radio. Hybrid radio combines broadcast radio and internet (IP) technologies to create a harmonised distribution technology.

The core technology standard (ETSI TS 103 270) relies on the Domain Name System (DNS) to allow a connected radio receiver to look up IP resources based on their broadcast parameters, such as the station identifier received within the broadcast signal. RadioDNS operates the root name server for the radiodns.org domain according to a published trust model. Although RadioDNS reserves the right to charge a small annual registration fee of USD10, this has never been charged and continues to be waived.

The project is an open standard, initially created by a series of broadcasters and manufacturers.

== History ==
RadioDNS was originally created as a collaborative project between Global Radio (at that time called GCap Media) and the BBC, to investigate creating a mechanism for linking Broadcast Radio and IP delivered webservices.

The concept was first presented to the WorldDMB Technical Committee in Munich in May 2008. Interest in the project grew, to the extent where it was necessary to formalise the project.

The First General Meeting of RadioDNS was hosted by the European Broadcasting Union in Geneva in October 2009

The Second General Meeting of RadioDNS (held on 16 February 2010 in Geneva) adopted the Statutes, Intellectual Rights Policy, Trust Model and Membership Process, and thus effectively established RadioDNS as a not-for-profit organisation.

At the Seventh General Meeting (held on 18 July 2013), the Members unanimously voted to incorporate RadioDNS as a Company Limited by Guarantee, registered in England and Wales. The company is jointly owned by its members, is governed by Articles and continues as not-for-profit entity. RadioDNS Limited holds the trademark registrations of the RadioDNS Logo and Words.

In January 2015, the original technology standards (RDNS01 and REPG01, which had been forked from the DAB EPG standard) were migrated to standards published by ETSI. RDNS01 became ETSI TS 103 270, and REPG01 was integrated into ETSI TS 102 818 v3.1.1.

== Details ==
The standard supports several radio bearers including VHF/FM, DAB, HD Radio, DRM and AMSS. Using a standardised format, a fully qualified domain name (FQDN) is constructed and queried. This returns a CNAME record known as the "authoritative FQDN", which is a domain that represents the requested radio service. From this domain, a SRV record lookup is done, which subsequently can be used to obtain the necessary information for the required type of application.

=== FM ===
An FM radio service is identified by its RDS parameters. For example, to identify a radio service on 95.8 MHz with a country code of E1 and the PI code C479, the following FQDN is constructed, where the third term consists of the first digit of the PI code followed by the country code:

09580.c479.ce1.fm.radiodns.org

Querying this domain returns a CNAME record:

09580.c479.ce1.fm.radiodns.org    canonical name = rdns.musicradio.com.

This CNAME record can then be used to look up SRV records that advertise the availability of applications based upon RadioDNS, in this example an application identified by the name radioepg:

_radioepg._tcp.rdns.musicradio.com    service = 0 100 80 epg.musicradio.com.

The final step is to access the information in http://epg.musicradio.com/radiodns/spi/3.1/SI.xml

=== DAB ===
A DAB radio service is identified by the country code, DAB ensemble ID and service ID. The fouAs an example, for country code E2, ensemble F201 and service ID C479, the FQDN is:

0.f201.f701.fe2.dab.radiodns.org

The subsequent steps are as for FM.

== Applications ==
The linking of broadcast media with IP, as RadioDNS enables, allows additional functionality on receivers.

Service and Programme Information (formerly RadioEPG) (ETSI TS 102 818) allows receivers to retrieve detailed metadata about radio services, programme schedules and on-demand audio.

Visual Slideshow (formerly RadioVIS) (ETSI TS 101 499) specifies how to provide visuals for radio broadcasts. Demonstrations have also been made of RadioVIS running on a mobile phone.

Other examples being worked on by the RadioDNS project include RadioTAG, a way for a listener to request more information, or simply bookmark a place, in a live broadcast.

== Implementations ==
RadioDNS standards have been implemented in a variety of connected radio devices and connected vehicles.

=== Domestic and Mobile Receivers ===
- The Sensia, manufactured by PURE, is an example of a receiver with Visual Slideshow
- Samsung Galaxy Grand 2 and Samsung Galaxy Express 2 LTE - Visual Slideshow, and Service and Programme Information
- Revo PiXiS RS - Visual Slideshow
- Android DAB applications DABdream and DAB-Z support fetching station logos

=== Vehicles (US Models) ===
==== Audi ====
Audi vehicles must have an Audi connect PRIME/PLUS account activated.

- Audi A3 (Model Year 2022 and newer)
- Audi A4 (Model Year 2020 and newer)
- Audi A5 (Model Year 2020 and newer)
- Audi A6 (Model Year 2021 and newer)
- Audi A7 (Model Year 2021 and newer)
- Audi A8 (Model Year 2021 and newer)
- Audi Q3 (Model Year 2022 and newer)
- Audi Q4 e-tron (Model Year 2022 and newer)
- Audi Q5 (Model Year 2021 and newer)
- Audi Q7 (Model Year 2021 and newer)
- Audi Q8 (Model Year 2021 and newer)
- Audi e-tron Sportback/SUV (Model Year 2021 and newer)
- Audi e-tron GT (Model Year 2022 and newer)

Note: The Audi TT and Audi R8 will not be receiving Hybrid Radio

==== Volkswagen (Model Year 2021 and Newer) ====
- Volkswagen Arteon
- Volkswagen Atlas (MY21.5 Update)
- Volkswagen Atlas Cross Sport
- Volkswagen Golf GTI
- Volkswagen Jetta
- Volkswagen Jetta GLI
- Volkswagen Tiguan

=== Other Vehicles ===
==== Volkswagen ====
- Touareg

==== Porsche ====
- Porsche Cayenne

== Alternatives ==
Service and Programme Information can be transmitted as a data service on DAB Digital Radio, and can include the Fully Qualified Domain Name of each radio service. This avoids the need for a DNS registration.

RadioText+ (RT+) in RDS (FM) and DynamicLabel Plus (DL+) in DAB already provide content type Programme.PROGRAMME.HOMEPAGE (and possibly Info.INFO.URL) which allows radio stations to pass along their website address to receivers without the need for a DNS registration.
