= RadioVIS =

RadioVIS is a protocol for sideband signalling of images and text messages for a broadcast audio service to provide a richer visual experience.

It is an application and sub-project of RadioDNS, which allows radio consumption devices to look up an IP-based service based on the parameters of the currently tuned broadcast station.

In January 2015, the functionality of RadioVIS was integrated to Visual Slideshow (ETSI TS 101 499 v3.1.1). The original RVIS01 document is now deprecated.

== Details ==
The protocol enables either Streaming Text Oriented Messaging Protocol (STOMP) or Comet to deliver text and image URLs to a client, with the images being acquired over a HTTP connection.

The technology is currently implemented by a number of broadcasters across the world, including Global Radio, Bauer Radio in the UK, RTÉ in the Republic Of Ireland, Südwestrundfunk in Germany and a number of Australian media groups amongst others.

A number of software clients exist to show the protocol, as well as hardware devices such as the Pure Sensia from Pure Digital, and the Colourstream from Roberts Radio.
