= Volkswagen Arteon =

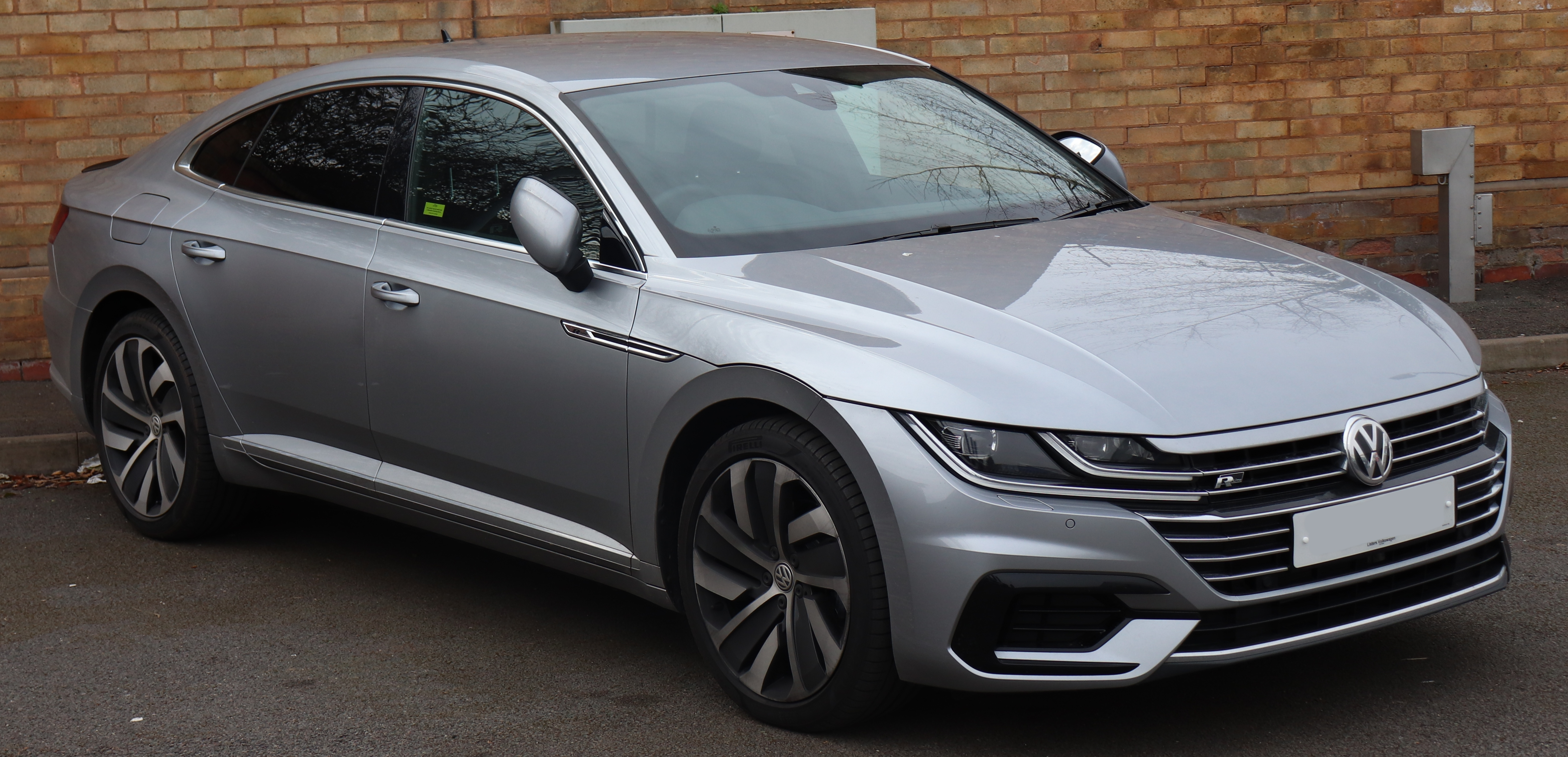
- Volkswagen Arteon 2.0 R-Line

Overview
- Manufacturer: Volkswagen
- Model code: 3H7
- Also called: Volkswagen CC (China)
- Production: 2017–2023 (Liftback); 2020–2024 (Shooting Brake); 2019–present (China)
- Model years: 2019–2023 (North America)
- Assembly: Germany: Emden, Lower Saxony; Osnabrück (VW Osnabrück; Shooting Brake only); China: Changchun (FAW-VW); Malaysia: Pekan (HICOM)
- Designer: Tobias Sühlmann; Marc Lichte

Body and chassis
- Class: Large family car (D)/Mid-size car
- Body style: 5-door liftback 5-door shooting brake
- Layout: Front-engine, front-wheel-drive Front-engine, all-wheel-drive
- Platform: Volkswagen Group MQB
- Related: Volkswagen Passat (B8); Škoda Superb (B8)

Powertrain
- Engine: Petrol: 1.5 L TSI I4; 2.0 L TSI I4; Petrol plug-in hybrid: 1.4 L EA211 TSI I4 (e-Hybrid); Diesel: 2.0 L TDI I4; 2.0 L BiTDI Twin-turbo I4
- Electric motor: 3-phase permanent magnet synchronous electric motor (e-Hybrid)
- Transmission: 6-speed manual 7-speed DSG; 8-speed automatic
- Hybrid drivetrain: PHEV

Dimensions
- Wheelbase: 2,837 mm (111.7 in)
- Length: 4,862 mm (191.4 in) (liftback); 4,866 mm (191.6 in) (shooting brake)
- Width: 1,871 mm (73.7 in)
- Height: 1,450 mm (57.1 in) (liftback); 1,462 mm (57.6 in) (shooting brake)

Chronology
- Predecessor: Volkswagen CC
- Successor: Volkswagen ID.7

The Volkswagen Arteon is a car manufactured by German car manufacturer Volkswagen. Described as a large family car or a mid-size car, it is available in five-door liftback or shooting brake body styles. The Arteon was unveiled on 6 March 2017, at the Geneva Motor Show, and at the Chicago Auto Show for the North American market. It is a direct successor to the CC; however, Volkswagen announced that the Arteon was positioned to be more upmarket than the CC. The vehicle is based on the MQB platform.

Production of the saloon was discontinued in 2023. The wagon was supposed to be produced until 2026, but it was prematurely discontinued at the end of 2024.

== Launch ==
Launched in Europe in 2017, the Arteon is positioned above the Passat, and is heavily based on the 2015 Volkswagen Arteon concept car shown at the Geneva International Motor Show. The Arteon made its debut for the United States at the 2018 Chicago Auto Show. Volkswagen delayed the launch in the United States of the Arteon due to unspecified issues with the emissions testing. Vehicles started arriving at dealerships in the US in April 2019. It became available in the Canadian market in the spring of 2019. The Arteon had multiple delays for Malaysia, only arriving to the market in August 2020. Less than a year later, in July 2021, the facelifted model was launched. However, it was discontinued for the Canadian market after the 2021 model year due to poor sales. Volkswagen announced that 2023 would be the final model year for the Arteon due to poor sales, and a shift in focus to high-volume models.

== History ==
=== 2020 ===
In 2020, the Arteon was given a facelift. A new shooting brake body style, plug-in hybrid and performance Volkswagen R variants were launched. The facelift included a new 260 mm (10.25 in) digital instrument panel in front of the driver, and an 200 mm (8.0 in) or 230 mm (9.2 in) infotainment touchscreen.

==== Arteon Shooting Brake ====
In 2020, a five-door station wagon variant, known as the Arteon Shooting Brake, was launched.

==== Arteon R ====
The Arteon R performance variant, launched in 2020, features Volkswagen's 2.0L TSI turbocharged petrol engine, which produces 236 kW; 320 PS (316 bhp) and 420 N⋅m (310 lb⋅ft). It will be available only in four-wheel drive through a seven-speed DSG gearbox and a Magna rear torque splitting differential. Its 0–100 km/h (0–62 mph) time is approximately five seconds. The Arteon R is available in both liftback and shooting-brake variants. The Arteon R was not available in the United States.

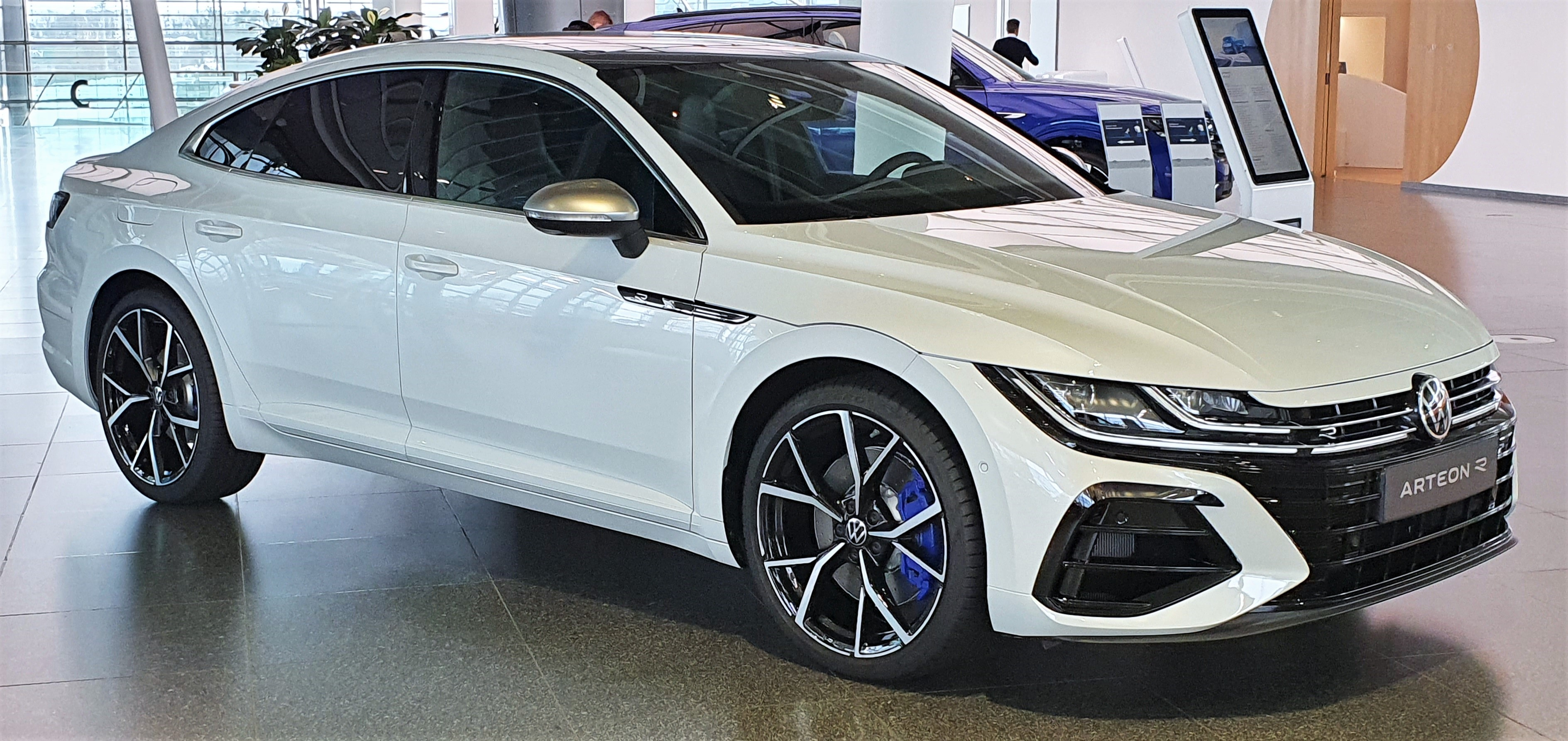
Arteon R

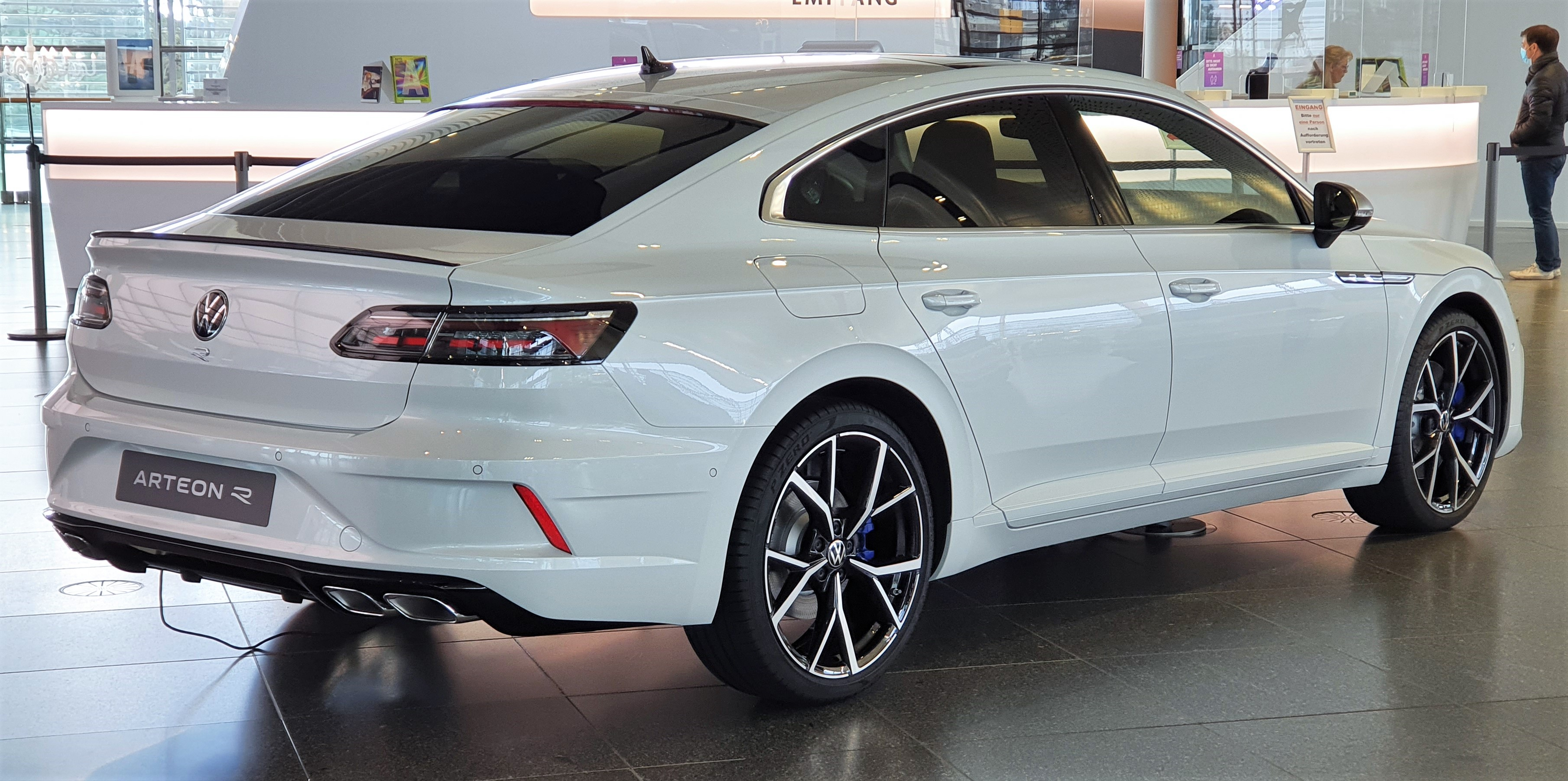
Arteon R rear view

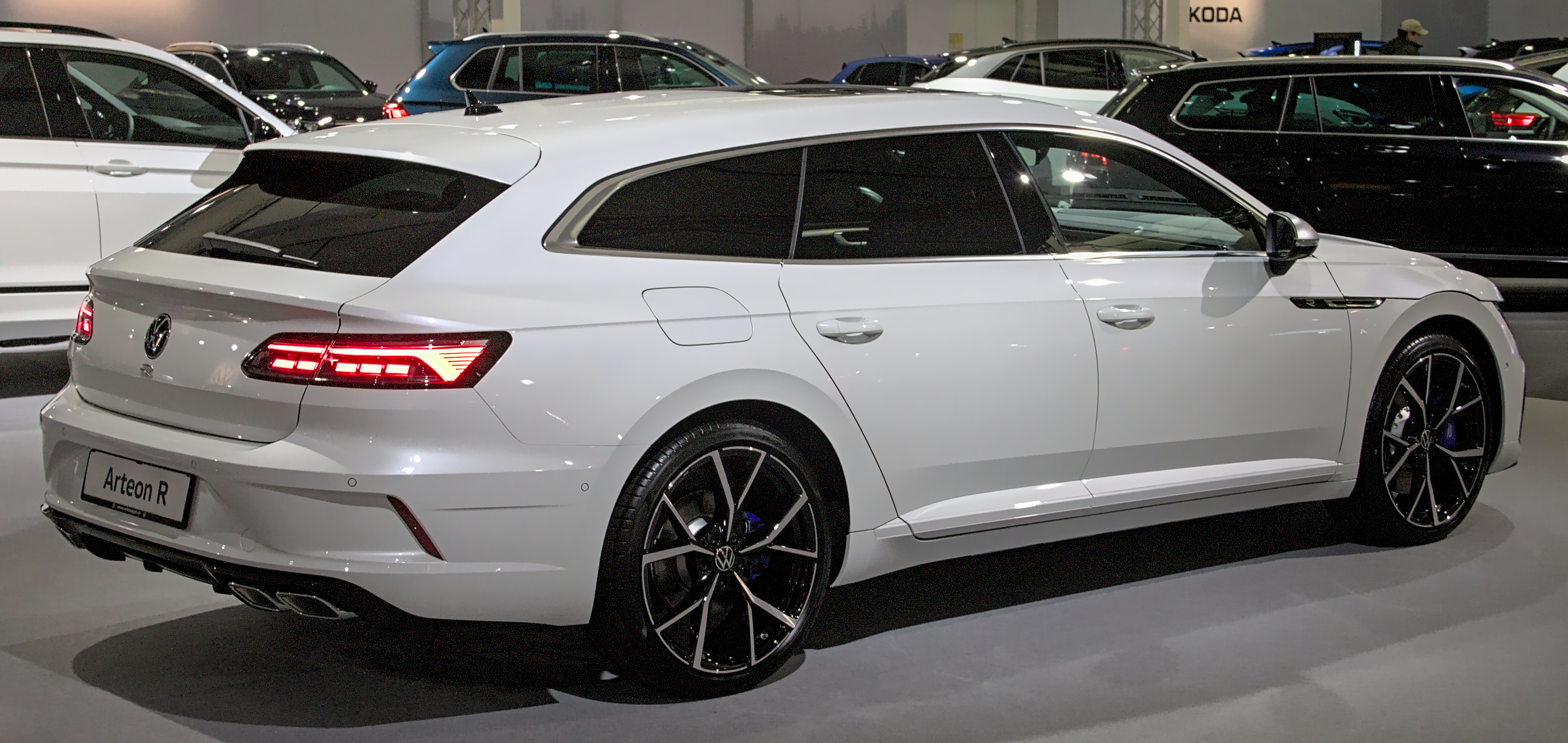
Arteon R Shooting Brake rear view

==== eHybrid ====
In 2020, a plug-in hybrid of both the Arteon and Arteon Shooting Brake was launched, known as the eHybrid. Available with only the 1.4L petrol engine, it offers an electric-only range of 61 km (38 mi), and a combined output of 160 kW (215 bhp).

Pre-facelift styling

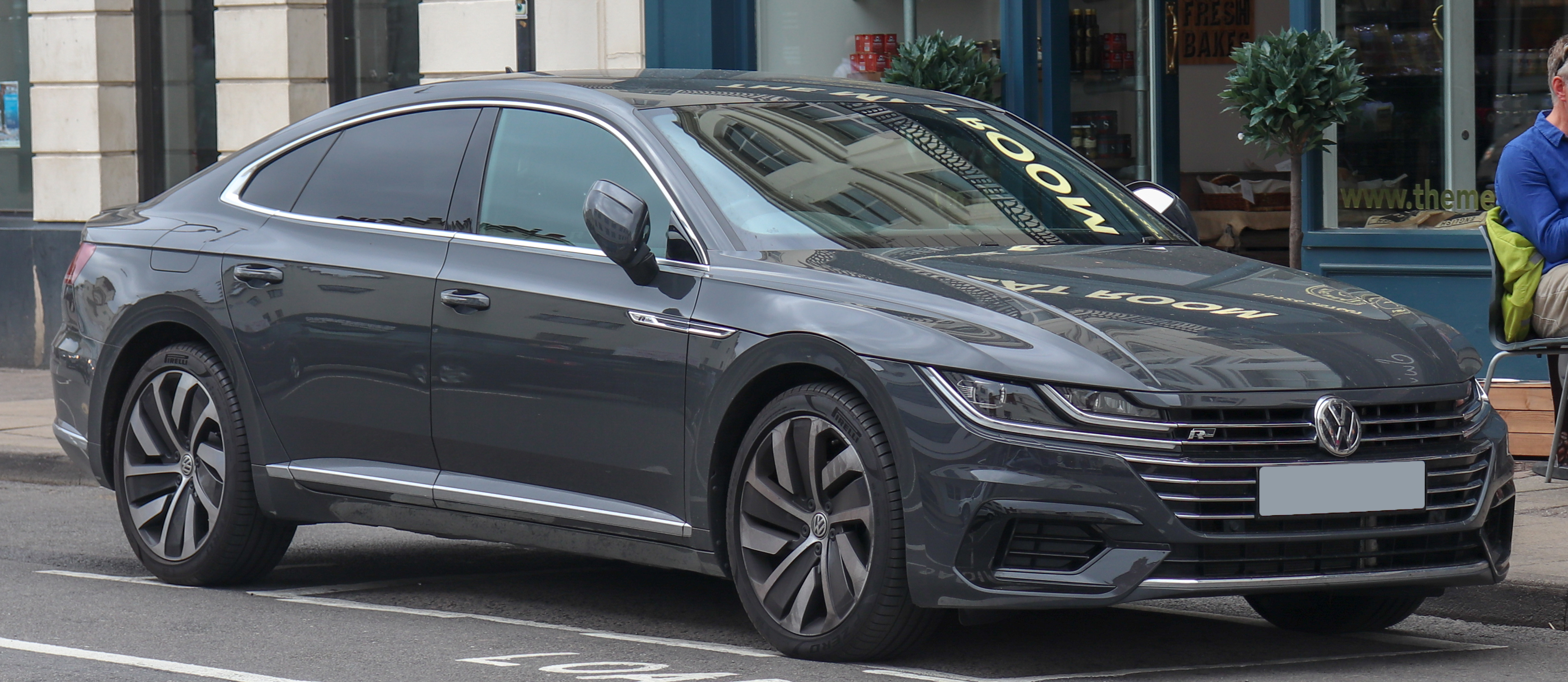
Arteon R-Line

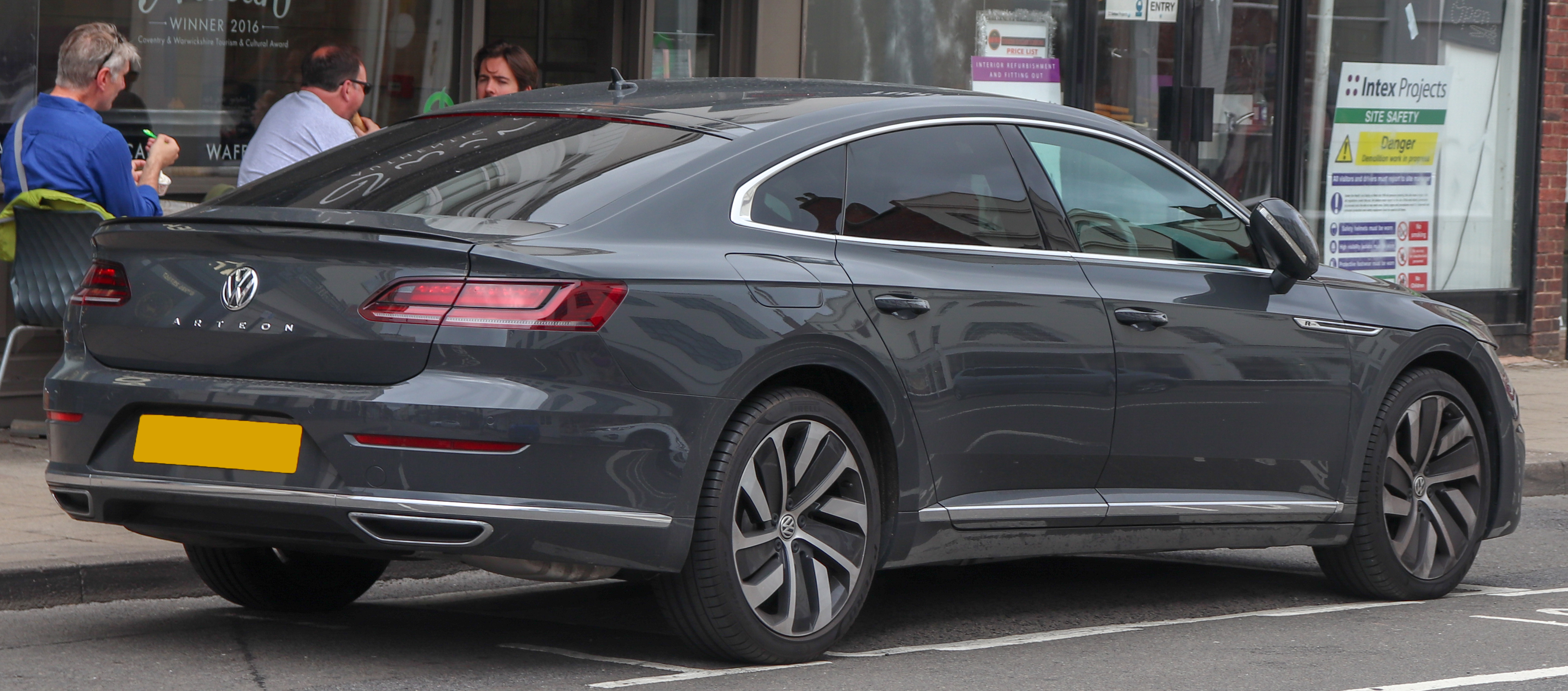
Rear

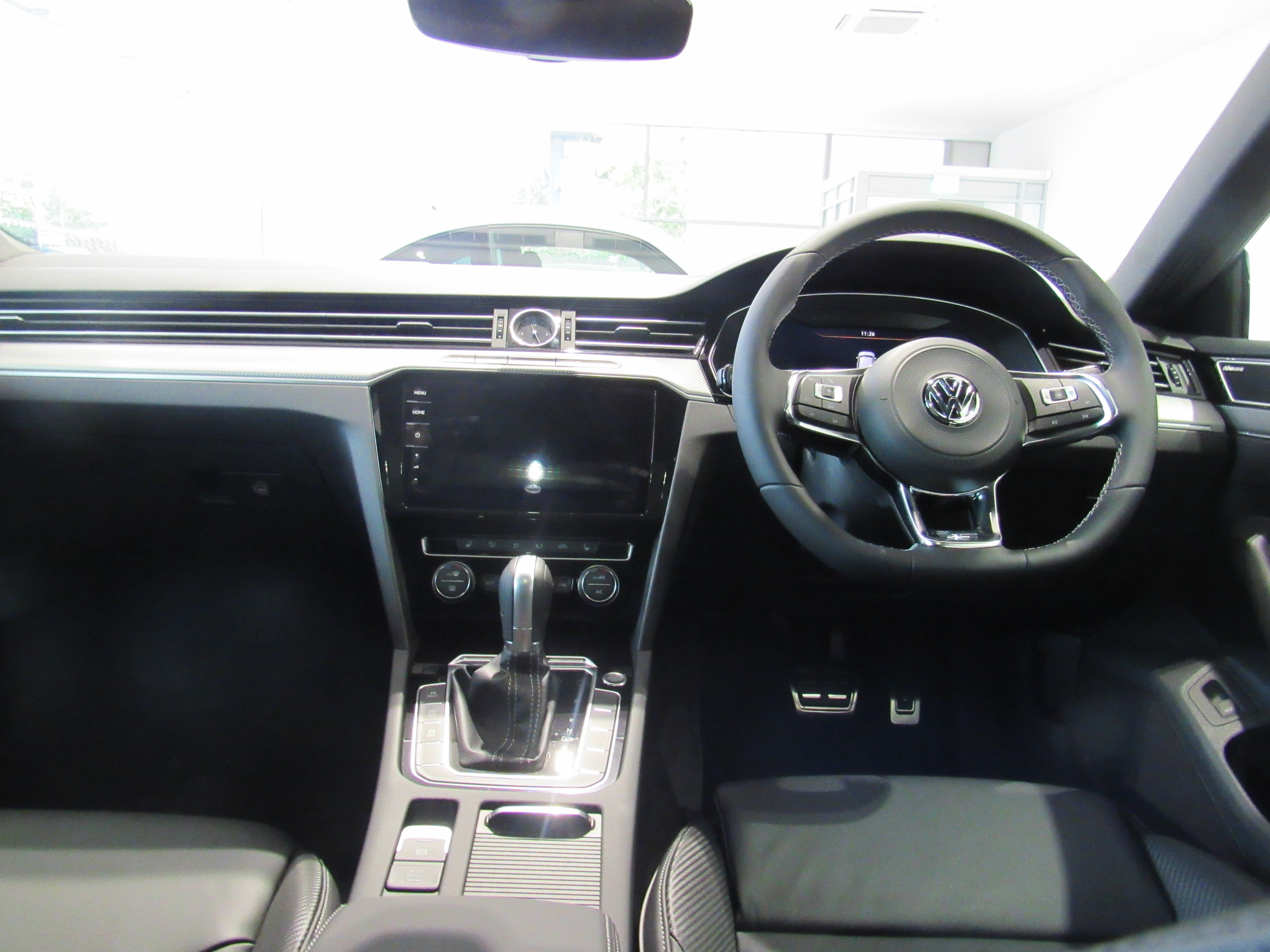
Interior

Post-facelift styling

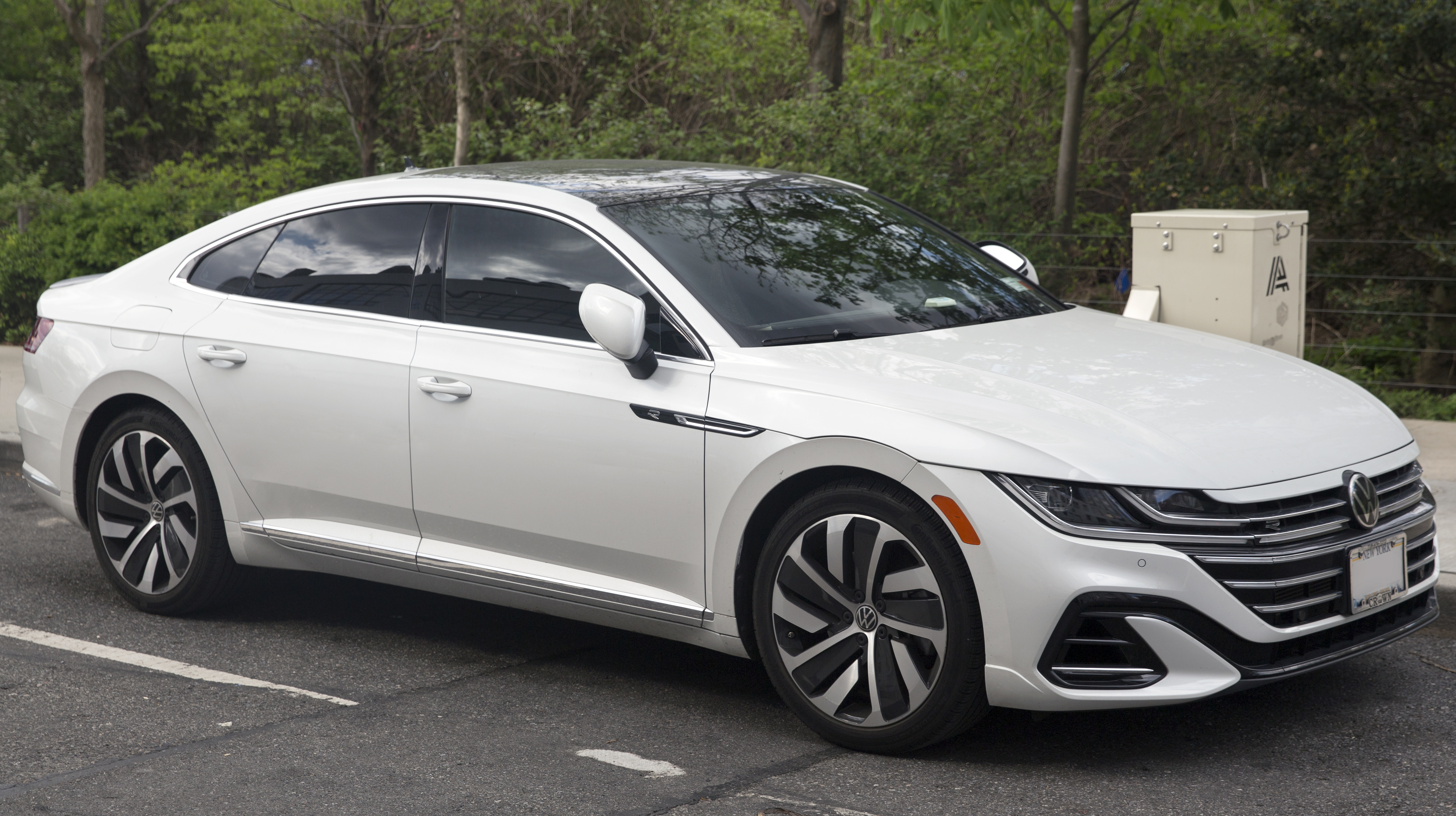
Volkswagen Arteon facelift

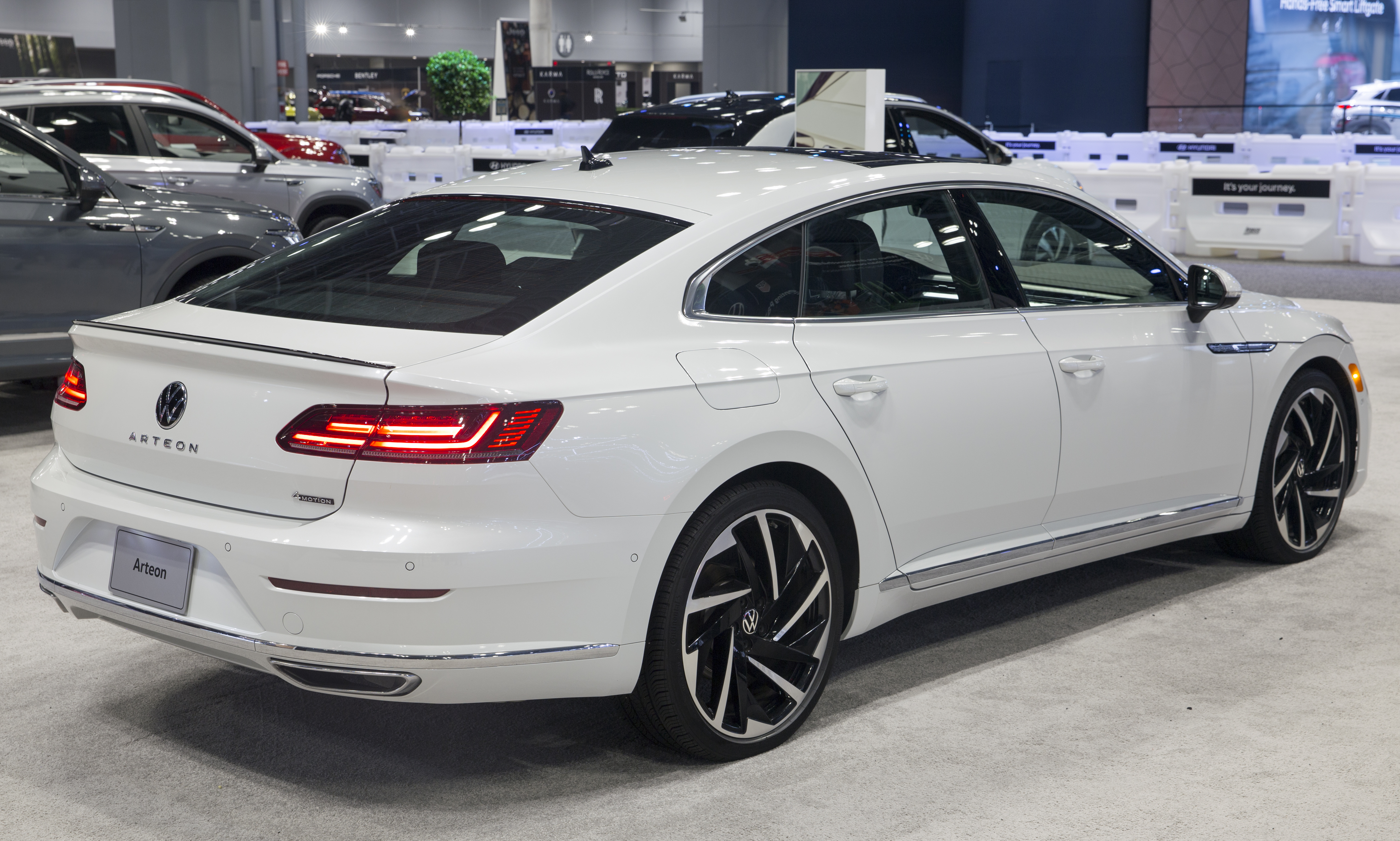
Rear

Volkswagen CC post-facelift styling (China)

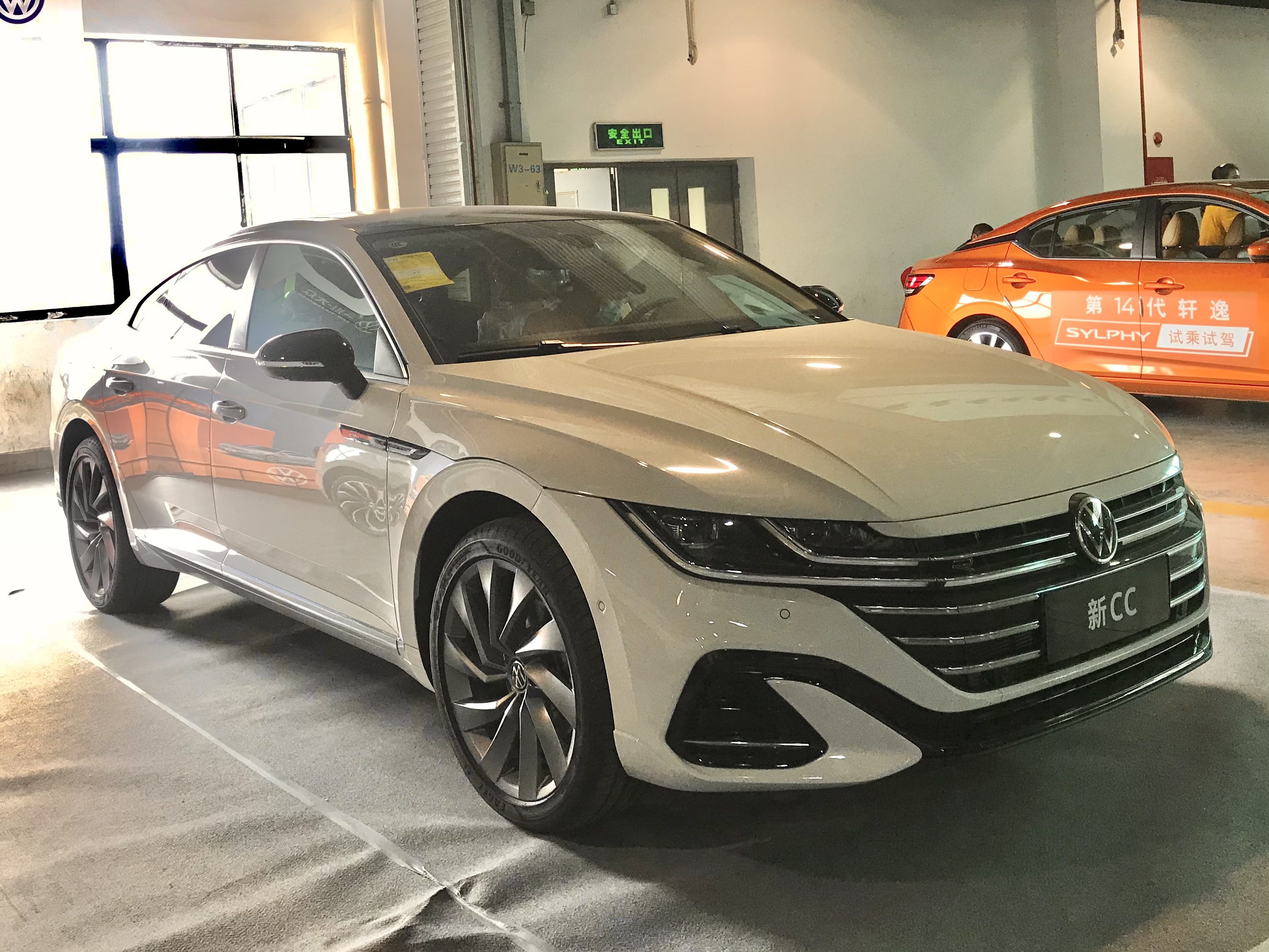
Volkswagen CC facelift (China)

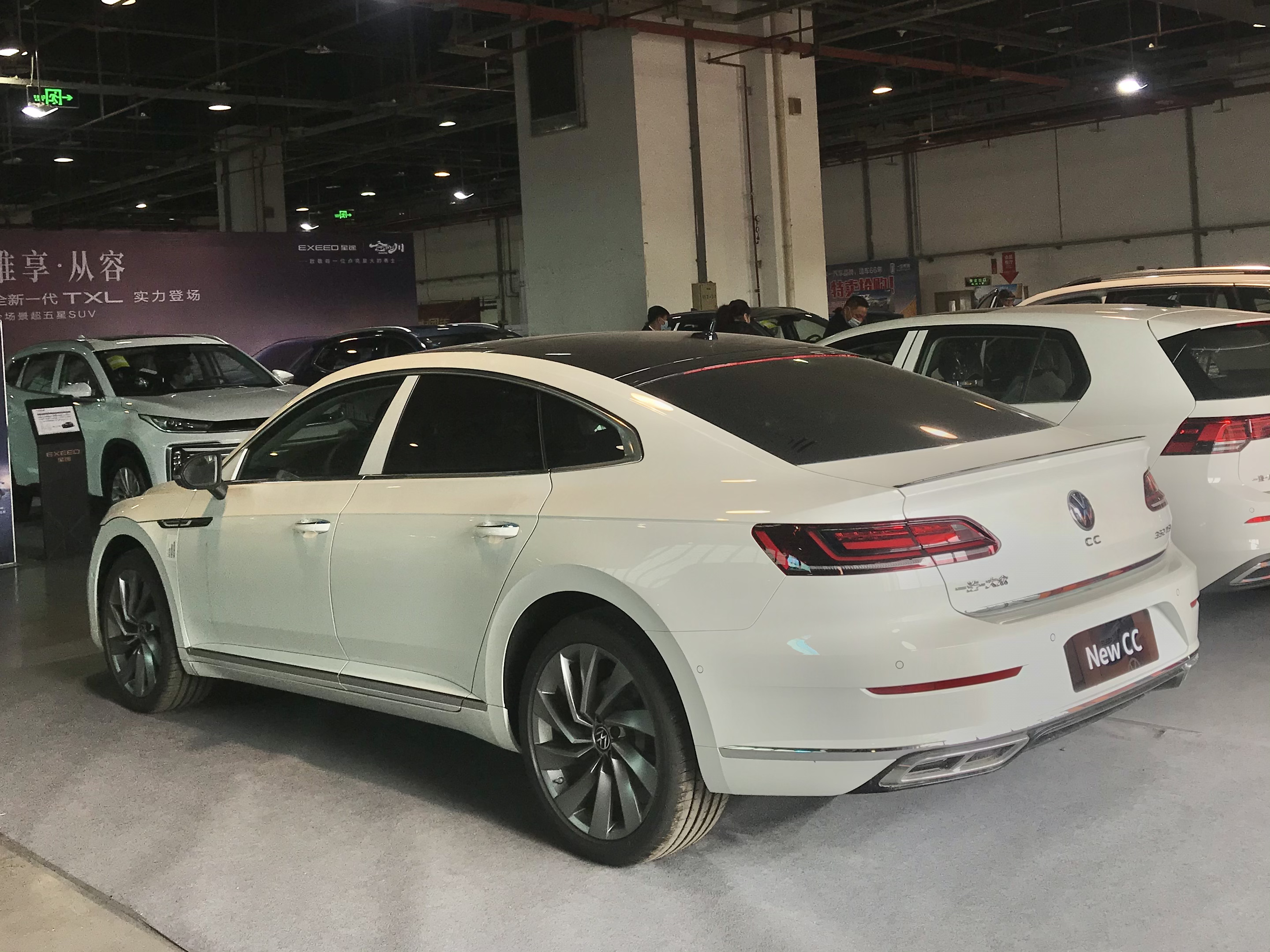
Rear

Arteon Shooting Brake

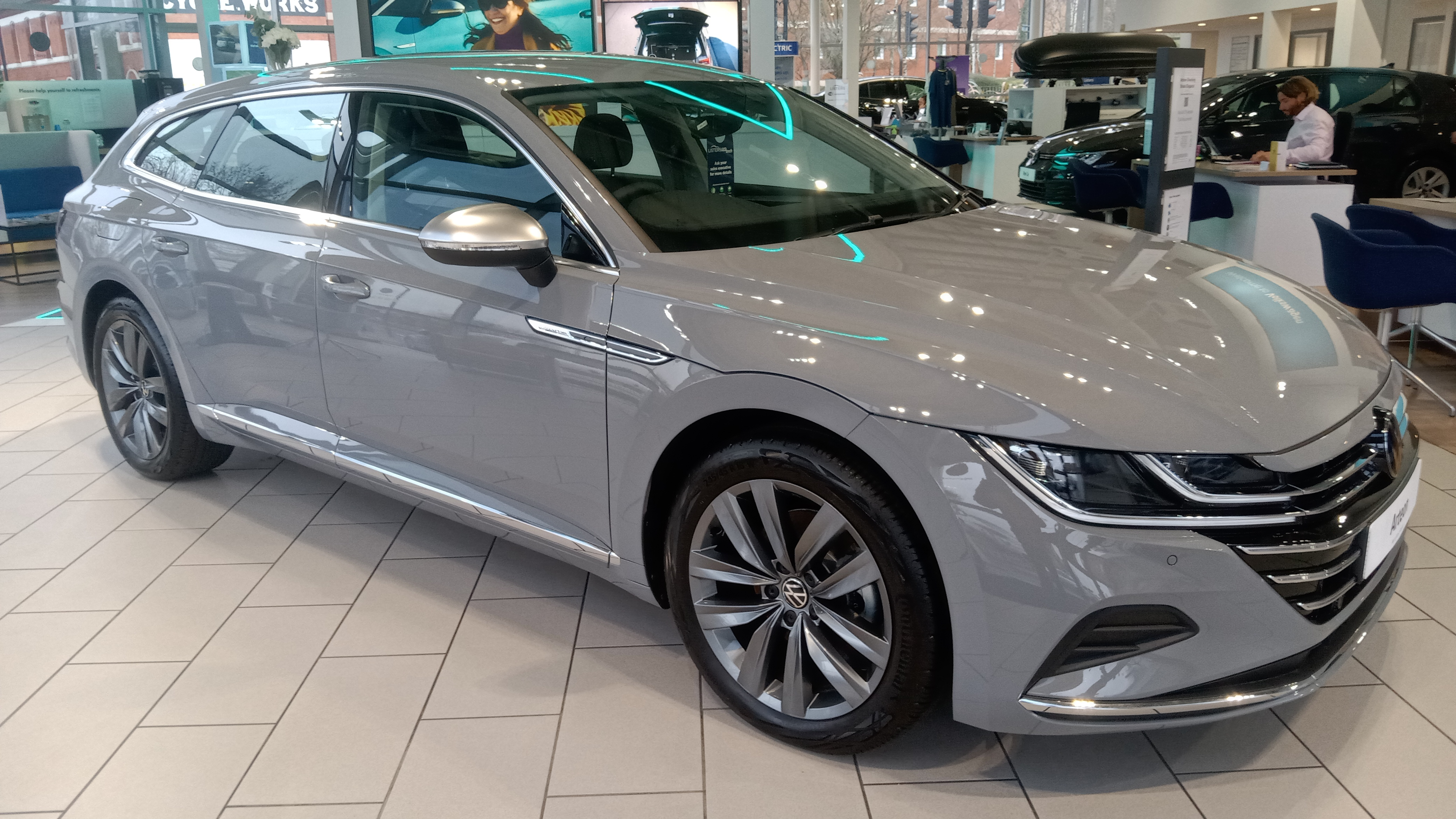
Volkswagen Arteon Shooting Brake

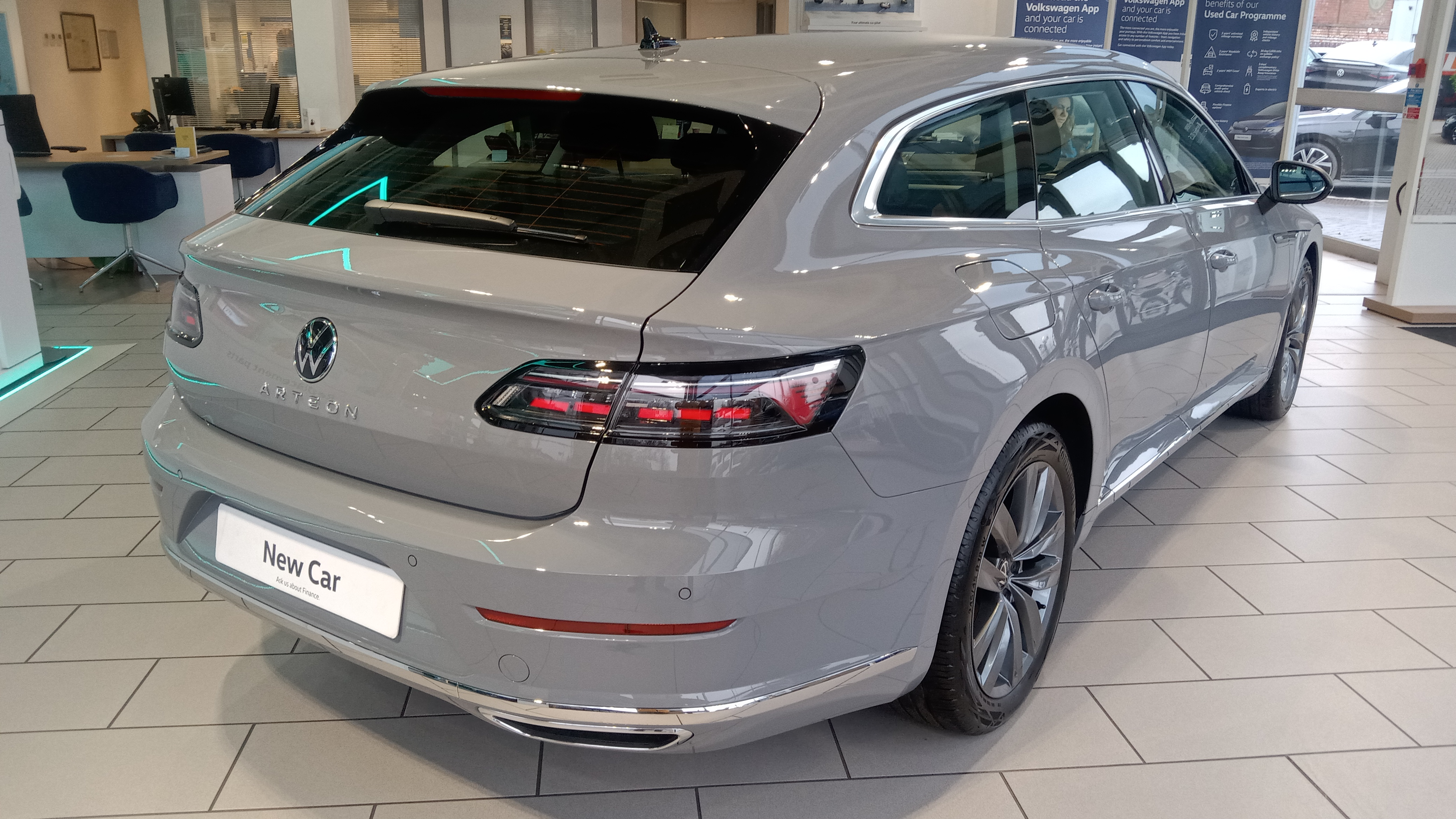
Rear

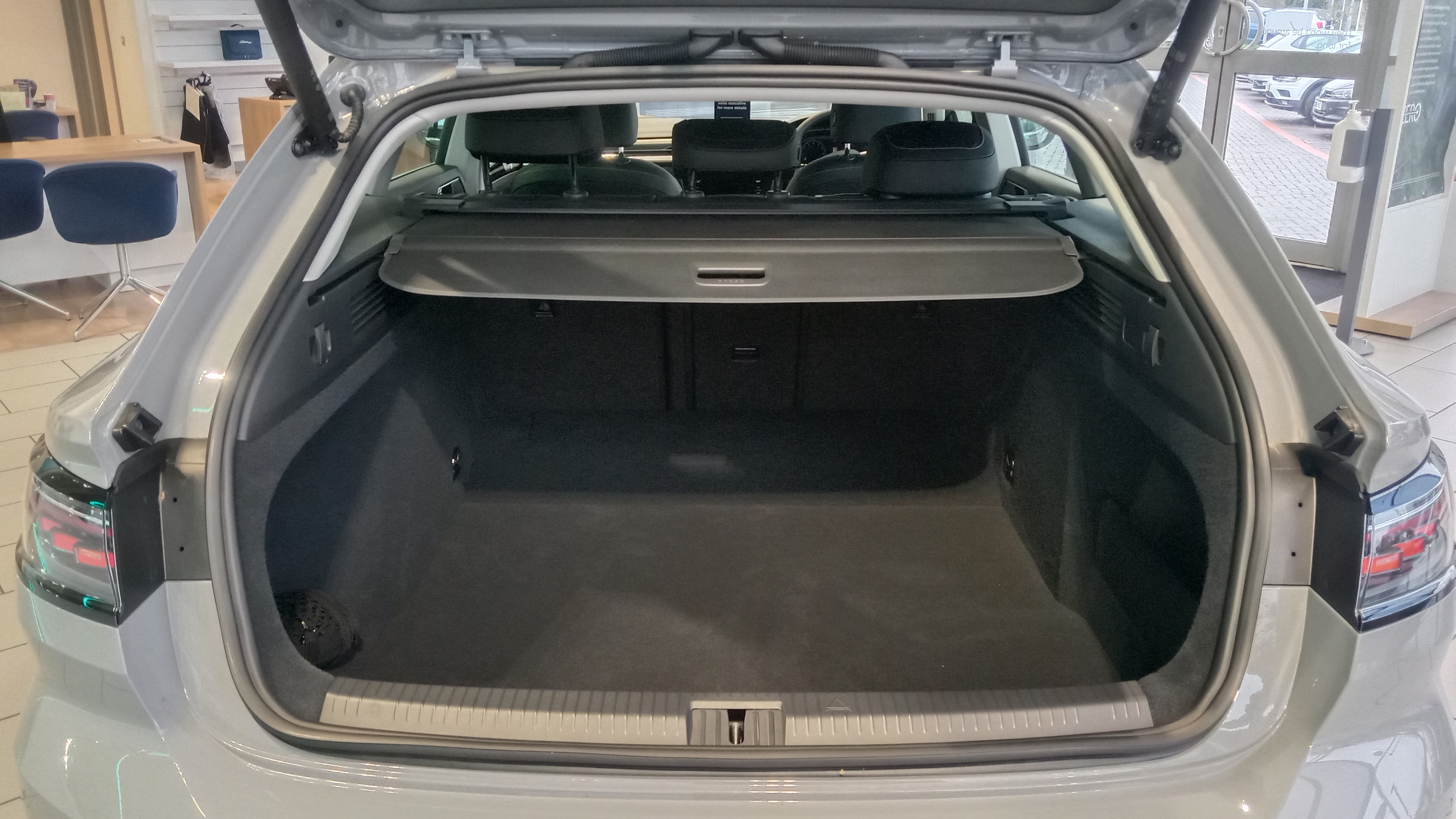
Boot

Volkswagen CC Shooting Brake (China)

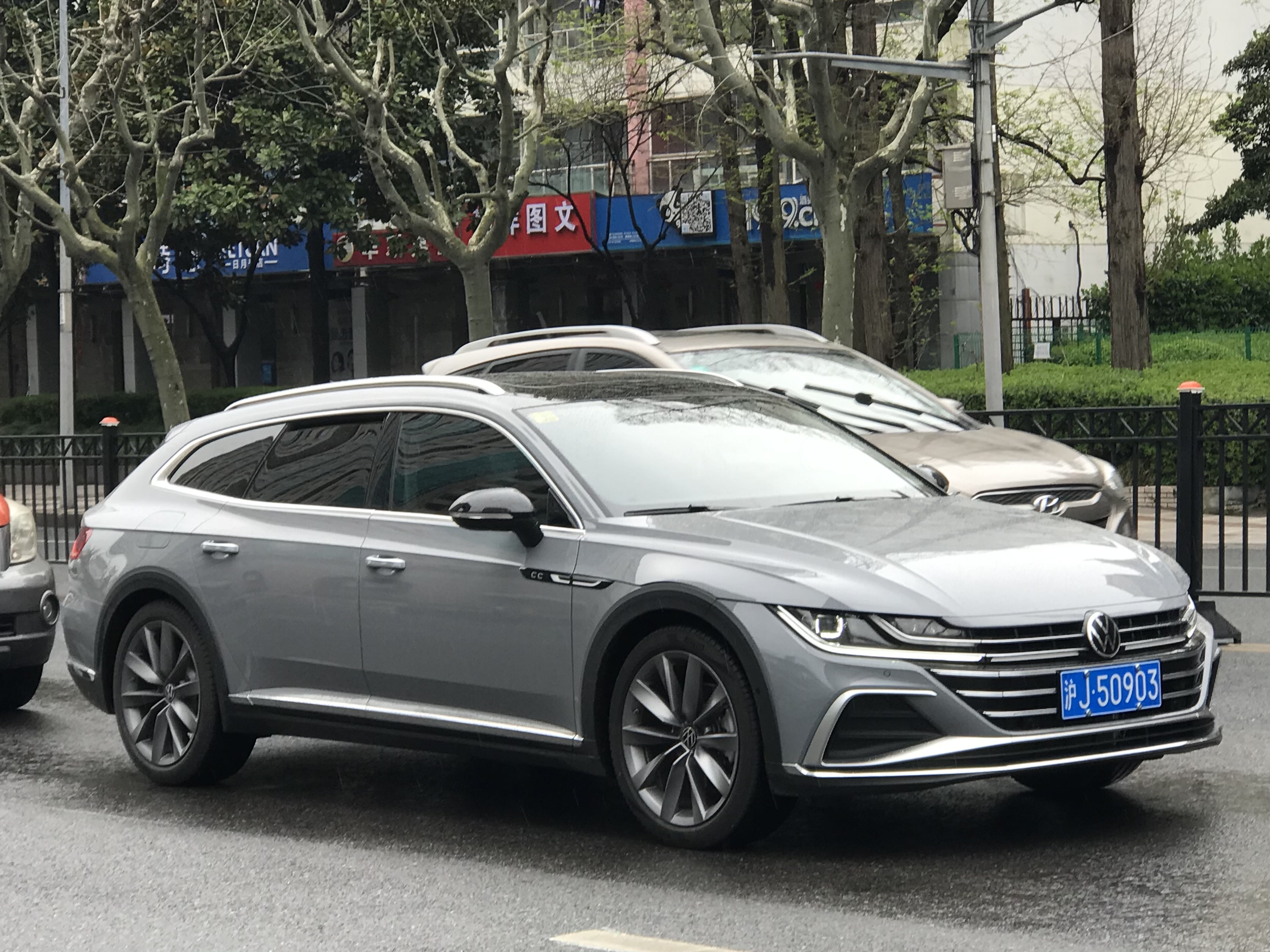
Volkswagen CC Shooting Brake (China)

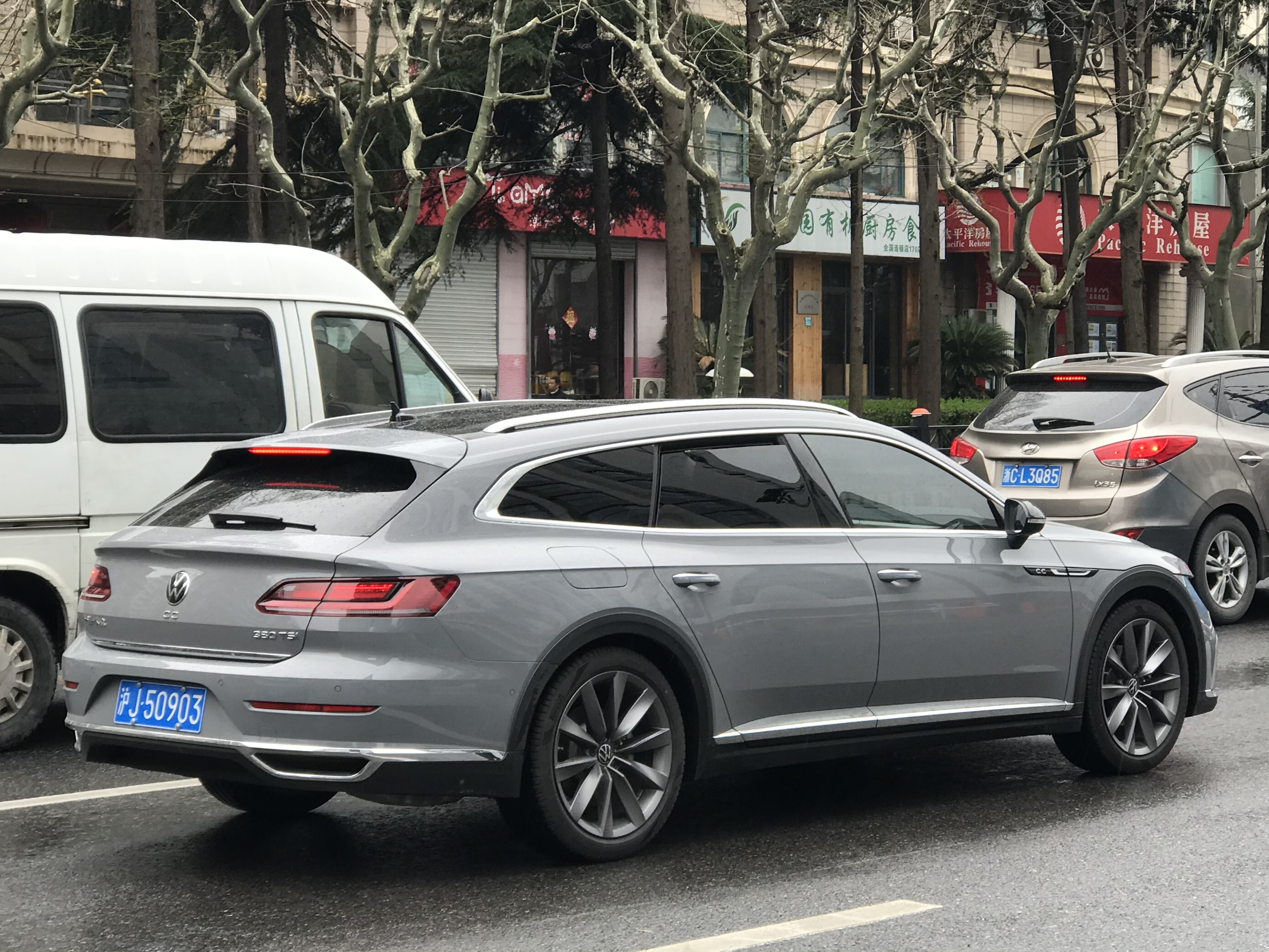
Rear

== Production ==
The Arteon is built in Emden, Lower Saxony, Germany. A version for the Chinese market, called the CC, is built in Changchun, China. It is also assembled in Pekan, Malaysia. The Arteon is based on Volkswagen's modular MQB platform.

== Engines ==
In Europe, the Arteon initially featured three turbo direct injection engines at launch: a 2.0L 280 PS TSI petrol engine and two diesel engines with 150 PS and 240 PS. Three additional engines were introduced shortly after, the 1.5L TSI Evo petrol engine with 150 PS, as well a petrol and a diesel engine, both with 190 PS.

In the United States, it was available in three trims—SE, SEL, and Premium—with one engine: all Arteons of 2019 will have Volkswagen's workhorse 2.0-litre turbo four, tuned to produce 268 hp and 258 lb⋅ft of torque. Power is managed by an 8-speed automatic transmission, with the choice of front- or all-wheel drive.

For the 2022 US-model, the Arteon got a powertrain upgrade which increased the power from 268 hp to 300 hp. In addition the 8-speed TipTronic-style automatic transmission has been upgraded to a 7-speed DSG transmission.

Petrol engines
Model	Type	Power, Torque at rpm	0–100 km/h (0–62 mph) (s)	Top speed	Transmission	CO_{2} emission (g/km)	Years
1.5 25 TSI (150 PS)	1,498 cc (91.4 cu in) I4	150 PS (110 kW; 148 hp) at 5000–6000, 250 N⋅m (184 lb⋅ft) at 1500–3500	9.0 (Manual); 8.9 (Automatic)	222 km/h (138 mph) (Manual); 220 km/h (137 mph) (Automatic)	6-speed manual 7-speed DSG	118 (Manual); 131 (Automatic)	2017–
2.0 TSI (190 PS)	1,984 cc (121.1 cu in) I4	190 PS (140 kW; 187 hp) at 4180–6000, 320 N⋅m (236 lb⋅ft) at 1500–4180	7.7	239 km/h (149 mph)	7-speed DSG	135	2017–
2.0 TSI 4motion (280 PS)	1,984 cc (121.1 cu in) I4	280 PS (206 kW; 276 hp) at 5100-6500 350 N⋅m (258 lb⋅ft) at 1700–5600	5.6	250 km/h (155 mph)	7-speed DSG	164	2017–
2.0 TSI (US version, optional 4motion)	1,984 cc (121.1 cu in) I4	268 hp (200 kW; 272 PS) at TBU RPM	6.4 (0-97 km)	204 km/h (127 mph)	8-speed automatic	N/A	2019–2021
2.0 TSI (US version, optional 4motion)	1,984 cc (121.1 cu in) I4	300 hp (224 kW; 304 PS) at 5350, 295 lb⋅ft (400 N⋅m) at 2000	4.6 (0-97 km)	206 km/h (128 mph)	7-speed DSG	N/A	2022–2023

Hybrid engines
Model	Type	Power, Torque at rpm	0–100 km/h (0–62 mph) (s)	Top speed	Transmission	CO_{2} emission (g/km)	Years
1.4 e-Hybrid TSI (215PS)	1,395 cc (85 cu in) I4 (VW EA211)	215 PS (158 kW; 212 hp) at 5000–6000, 400 N⋅m (295 lb⋅ft) at 1500–3500	7.9 (Automatic)	220 km/h (137 mph) (Automatic)	6-speed DSG (DQ400e)	131 (Automatic)	2020–

Diesel engines
Model	Type	Power, Torque at rpm	0–100 km/h (0–62 mph) (s)	Top speed	Transmission	CO_{2} emission (g/km)	Years
2.0 TDI SCR (150 PS)	1,968 cc (120.1 cu in) I4	150 PS (110 kW; 148 hp) at 3500–4000, 340 N⋅m (251 lb⋅ft) at 1750–3000	9.4 (Manual); 9.1 (Automatic)	222 km/h (138 mph) (Manual); 220 km/h (137 mph) (Automatic)	6-speed manual 7-speed DSG	112 (Manual); 116 (Automatic)	2017–
2.0 TDI SCR (190 PS)	1,968 cc (120.1 cu in) I4	190 PS (140 kW; 187 hp) at 3500–4000, 400 N⋅m (295 lb⋅ft) at 1900–3300	8.3 (Manual); 8.0 (Automatic)	240 km/h (149 mph) (Manual); 238 km/h (148 mph) (Automatic)	6-speed manual 7-speed DSG	119 (Manual); 122 (Automatic)	2017–2020
2.0 TDI SCR 4motion (190 PS)	1,968 cc (120.1 cu in) I4	190 PS (140 kW; 187 hp) at 3500–4000, 400 N⋅m (295 lb⋅ft) at 1900–3300	7.8	233 km/h (145 mph)	7-speed DSG	134	2017–2020
2.0 TDI SCR 4motion (200 PS)	1,968 cc (120.1 cu in) I4	200 PS (147 kW; 197 hp) at 3500–4000, 400 N⋅m (295 lb⋅ft) at 1900–3300	7.9	233 km/h (145 mph)	7-speed DSG	134	2020–
2.0 BiTDI SCR 4motion (240 PS)	1,968 cc (120.1 cu in) I4	240 PS (177 kW; 237 hp) at 4000,500 N⋅m (369 lb⋅ft) at 1750–2500	6.5	245 km/h (152 mph)	7-speed DSG	152	2017–2020

== Transmission ==
Model	Years	Types
1.5 25 TSI (150 PS)	2017–	6-speed manual, 7-speed DSG
2.0 TSI (190 PS)	2017–	7-speed DSG
2.0 TSI 4motion (280 PS)	2017–	7-speed DSG
2.0 TDI SCR (150 PS)	2017–	6-speed manual, 7-speed DSG
2.0 TDI SCR (190 PS)	2017–	6-speed manual, 7-speed DSG
2.0 TDI SCR 4motion (190 PS)	2017–	7-speed DSG
2.0 TDI SCR 4motion (200 PS)	2020–	7-speed DSG
2.0 BiTDI SCR 4motion (240 PS)	2017–	7-speed DSG
2.0 TSI (271PS)	2019–	8-speed AWF8F35

== Safety ==
The Arteon can be fitted with an optional safety system called Emergency Assist 2.0, and it takes advantage of four existing Volkswagen safety programs: Adaptive Cruise Control, Side Assist, Lane Assist and Park Assist. The Arteon will notice if a driver has not touched the accelerator, brakes or steering wheel for a certain length of time, and it will attempt to alert the person with sounds, visual cues and even a physical brake tap. If that does not work, Emergency Assist 2.0 takes over: the car's hazard lights switch on and it steers itself to a safe nearside lane. The system uses Lane Assist to recognize lines on the road and Park Assist to actually steer the car. Radar detection via Adaptive Cruise Control and Side Assist helps ensure the Arteon will not hit any other vehicles.

=== ANCAP ===
ANCAP test results* Volkswagen Arteon (2017, aligned with Euro NCAP)
Test	Points	%
Overall:	5 /5 stars	
Adult occupant:	36.7	96%
Child occupant:	42	85%
Pedestrian:	36.1	85%
Safety assist:	8.9	74%

=== Euro NCAP ===
Euro NCAP test results* Volkswagen Arteon (2017)
Test	Points	%
Overall:	5 /5 stars	
Adult occupant:	36.8	96%
Child occupant:	42	85%
Pedestrian:	36.1	85%
Safety assist:	9.9	82%

== Awards ==
- 2017 Golden Steering Wheel Award ("midsize and premium class" category)
- 2019 Tow Car Awards – Overall Winner

== Sales ==
Year	Global production	Europe sales	U.S. sales	China sales		
Year	Global production	Europe sales	U.S. sales	Arteon	CC	Total
2017	37,972	9,798				21,472
2018	49,735	21,495				16,065
2019	51,868	19,408	2,449			23,807
2020	55,899	13,582	3,602			28,428
2021	42,508	20,994	5,537			21,081
2022	69,627	22,789	1,742			32,948
2023	60,467		2,347	53	33,150	33,203
2024			1,256	–	29,333	29,333
2025				–	17,019	17,019
2026			1	–		
