= 201st Division =

201st Division or 201st Infantry Division may refer to:

- 201st Division (People's Republic of China)
- 201st Infrastructure Construction Engineer Division, People's Republic of China
- 201st Infantry Division (German Empire)
- 201st Security Division, a German Army unit of World War II
- 201st Coastal Division, Italy
- 201st Division (Imperial Japanese Army)
- 201st Rifle Division, Soviet Union, later the 201st Motor Rifle Division

== See also ==
- List of military divisions by number
- 201st Brigade (disambiguation)
- 201st Regiment (disambiguation)
- 201st (disambiguation)
