= 201st Infrastructure Construction Engineer Division =

201st Infrastructure Construction Engineer Division (1972-78) 26th Detachment of Infrastructure Construction Engineer （1978-84）
- Active: 1972.1 - 1984.1
- Country: People's Republic of China
- Branch: People's Liberation Army
- Type: Division
- Role: Construction Engineer
- Part of: Shenyang Military Region
- Garrison/HQ: Shenyang, Liaoning province

201st Infrastructure Construction Engineer Division (Chinese: 基本建设工程兵第201师) was activated in January 1972 from Unit 406, 3rd Bureau of Second Ministry of Machine Building. The division was composed of 601st, 602nd, 603rd and 604th Engineer Regiments.

The division was under the command of Shenyang Military Region. Headquartered in Shenyang, the division acted as a nuclear program-related geologic survey unit in Northeastern China.

In July 1975 the division was transferred to Infrastructure Construction Engineer Office, Ministry of Second Machine Industry's control.

In August 1978, the division was renamed as 26th Detachment of Infrastructure Construction Engineer(Chinese: 基建工程兵第26支队). All its regiments were renamed as follow:

- 601st Regiment was renamed as 251st Group;
- 602nd Regiment was renamed as 252nd Group;
- 603rd Regiment was renamed as 253rd Group;
- 604th Regiment was renamed as 254th Group.

In October 1978 the detachment was transferred to Second Machine Industrial Command, Infrastructure Construction Engineer's control.

On January 1, 1984, the detachment was demobilized and reorganized as Northeastern Geologic Survey Bureau of the Ministry of Nuclear Industry.
