= 201 (disambiguation) =

201 was a year of the Julian calendar, in the third century AD.

201 may also refer to:

- 201 (number), the natural number following 200 and preceding 202
- 201 BC, a year of the pre-Julian Roman calendar
- an HTTP Status code meaning Created
- 201 Penelope, a main-belt asteroid
- "201" (South Park), an episode of the American adult animated sitcom
- 201 (area code), used for telephone numbers in New Jersey, USA
- Route 201 (MBTA), a bus route in Massachusetts, US
- Event 201, a pandemic exercise
- Peugeot 201, a car manufactured by Peugeot
