= 201st Battalion (Toronto Light Infantry), CEF =

1915–1916 Canadian Expeditionary Force unit

The 201st (Toronto Light Infantry) Battalion, CEF was a unit in the Canadian Expeditionary Force during World War I. Based in Toronto, Ontario, the unit began recruiting during the winter of 1915/16 in that city. The battalion was disbanded while still in Canada, and its men were transferred to the 170th (Mississauga Horse) Battalion, CEF, and 198th (Canadian Buffs) Battalion, CEF in September 1916. The 201st (Toronto Light Infantry) Battalion, CEF had one officer commanding: Lieutenant Colonel E. W. Hagarty.

== Publication ==
From The T.L.I. Gazette, the memorial publication of the 201st Battalion CEF (date of publication unknown):

"The 201st Battalion had nearly 550 members at the time of its dismemberment, and it is estimated that around 500 of them went overseas. Most of these reached France and the firing line, and about the first to have the experience of front line work were a draft of 48 who went to the 75th Bn. in December 1916, and a similar draft who went to the 58th Bn. about the same date. Altogether there were nine infantry units that received members of the old battalion. These were the 3rd, 19th, 20th, 58th, 72nd, 75th, 102nd and 116th Battalions, and the 2nd C.M.R. Others served with artillery, heavy and field and when the Machine Gun battalions were formed in the spring of '18, some of the boys found their way into them. Others managed to 'wangle' the much coveted transfer into the Royal Flying Corps. Two attained captaincies in the R.F.C., Tracey, our former bandmaster, and W.A. Leslie, Annis, H.T. Leslie, J.H. White, Jones, Heakes, Crawford, Leary, Pinnock, Curtis, Henderson, Ferguson, and Harvey were all Flight-Lieutenants and Miles and J.G. Johnston were cadets. Lieuts. Annis, Curtis and Pinnock were killed.

Of the infantry units the 72nd proved the most unlucky for our boys; only three went to it and of these, A.J. McFarquhar is the sole survivor, the other two, H. Bain and H. Davey being killed. And the 2nd C.M.R. bunch were the most fortunate, all of them returning safe if not sound. Altogether the battalion suffered a loss of 74 killed in action or died of wounds or sickness, and to commemorate these lads who thus gave their lives for their country is the main purpose of this publication."

There follows a list of the fallen (notes on how they died, where known, are excerpted from the publication):

Name	Unit / service	Details
W. F. Annis	58th Battalion; Royal Flying Corps	Joined the 58th Battalion in October 1916. After being wounded, he was sent to Canada to join the Royal Flying Corps and was killed there during practice.
D. Abbot	75th Battalion	Joined the 75th Battalion in December 1916 and was killed at Vimy.
M. H. Archer		
H. Baber		
J. A. Baxter		
W. H. F. Atkin		
D. C. Bates	58th Battalion	Killed on the Mericourt front.
W. H. Bennett		
N. J. Brown ("Jack")	58th Battalion	Killed in a raid shortly before Vimy.
W. E. A. Brown ("Alway")	75th Battalion	Joined the 75th Battalion in February 1918. Wounded on July 20, 1918, and killed in action near Arras on September 4, 1918.
D. B. Carr		
W. Colquhoun		
R. J. D. Conklin ("Bob")	19th Battalion	Joined the 19th Battalion with a draft from the 198th after the Fifth Division was broken up. Wounded at Arras on August 16, 1918, and died of his wounds at No. 1 Casualty Clearing Station three days later.
W. Craig	75th Battalion	Joined the 75th Battalion in December 1916 and was killed on September 2, 1918.
F. W. Curtis		
F. W. Davie		
H. Davey		
A. Dyson	75th Battalion	Killed in March 1917.
B. A. Earnshaw		Killed at Cambrai on October 1, 1918.
H. W. Ellis		
G. H. Ewens		
G. H. Forrester		
H. C. Fogarty		Killed at Arras in August 1918.
E. A. Fryers	20th Battalion	Joined the 20th Battalion in April 1917. Wounded in July, rejoined his unit in November, and was killed in action on January 26, 1918.
J. L. Gloves		
H. J. Goodyear		
G. Hadden		Killed at Cambrai on October 1, 1918.
F. W. B. Hall		
C. Hewson		Killed at Vimy and buried at Vimy Ridge.
B. S. Heath		
R. J. Hipkiss		
W. Hollinger		
A. E. Hogarth	75th Battalion	Killed on March 1, 1917.
R. C. James		
E. Johns		
J. L. Johnson		
E. F. Johnson		
R. Kerr	75th Battalion	Killed on March 1, 1917.
S. H. Kensett		
J. H. Laurence		Killed on the Mericourt front on September 17, 1917.
F. Ledrew	198th Battalion; Army Service Corps; 8th Canadian Railway Troops	Joined the 198th but was rejected as physically unfit when the unit went overseas. Subsequently joined the Army Service Corps and reached France with the 8th Canadian Railway Troops in October 1917. Killed on March 5, 1918, and buried at Bailleul, France.
B. Lillew	201st Battalion; 116th Battalion	Served as a bugler with the 201st and reached France with the 116th Battalion in early 1917. Served as a company runner until he was killed during the Battle of Amiens on August 8, 1918. Buried at Domart on the Amiens–Roye road.
F. Lomas		
R. F. Lowrie	201st Battalion	Was 16 when he joined the 201st Battalion. Served as a company runner and was killed on May 12, 1918. Buried at Bellacourt.
H. Mitchell ("Hal")	58th Battalion	Killed in the summer of 1917.
J. P. Mitcheson	75th Battalion	Killed on March 1, 1917.
J. Meridew		
W. H. Moffatt		
J. M. Moir		
G. B. Morgan	75th Battalion	Killed on March 1, 1917.
H. C. Moore		
A. P. McDonald		
A. McComb		
A. G. McConnell		Killed at Cambrai on September 30, 1918.
McNutt		
G. Noble		
J. Oakley		
G. Parker	75th Battalion	Killed on April 4, 1917.
C. Pinnock		
L. B. Ramsay	75th Battalion	Wounded on March 1, 1917, when Col. Beckett and many members of the 75th were killed. Recovered in England and returned to duty. Killed in the Amiens sector on August 22, 1918.
W. F. Ramsden		
R. W. Rowswell		
R. Robertson		
W. J. Searle	58th Battalion	Killed at Mount St. Eloi in the spring of 1917 and buried there.
F. G. Stockil	75th Battalion	Wounded in the knee on August 4, 1917. Rejoined his unit and was killed on the Lens front on August 15, 1917.
S. Smith ("Stanley")	19th Battalion	Wounded on May 12, 1918, and died the same day at No. 29 Casualty Clearing Station. Buried in Bayneux Imperial Cemetery, Doullens.
G. C. Taylor	19th Battalion	Wounded near Arras on August 16, 1918, and died on August 21, 1918.
G. A. Tucker		
W. G. Tyrrell		
J. W. Ward		
R. S. Waldron		
Walker		
F. E. Warner		
G. Wesley		
A. D. White		
J. Woodgate		
H. Worthington	Divisional Signals; 1st Artillery Brigade HQ	Transferred to Divisional Signals when the 201st was broken up and went overseas in November 1916. Went to France in April 1917 and served as a lineman with 1st Artillery Brigade headquarters. Killed at Hill 70 on July 31, 1917.

== Further Commentary ==
Further commentary from one contributor to the publication:

"But our narrative concerns particularly those who went to the 'Horses' (170th Mississauga Horse Battalion) ...

Proceeding overseas in October 1916, two drafts went to France reinforcing the 75th and 58th battalions. The remainder of the 170th was drafted into the 169th battalion and, after a short stay in that unit, the majority transferred to the 116th Battalion. Crossing the Channel with that unit, they landed in Boulogne, France on February 11, 1917.

The battalion proceeded immediately up the line and taking the place of the 60th battalion in the third division 9th Brigade, fought through all the engagements in which that division took part in 1917 and 1918. Prominent among these shows were Vimy, Avion, Lens, Passchendaele, Amiens, Arras and Cambrai. The 201st fellows, some forty-one in number, played an important part in their unit, many winning promotions and six being awarded decorations for bravery on the field.

But we would pay tribute to those who made the supreme sacrifice, who died gallantly in action, happy in the thought that they had done what they could and that they were giving their lives for others."
