= Programme identification =

Programme Identification (PI) is a service provided by radio stations transmitting Radio Data System (RDS) data as part of the FM radio broadcast. The PI code allows the radio to identify the station across different broadcast relay stations. This in turn allows listeners to stay tuned to a network whilst travelling across the service area of multiple transmitters.

The PI code is a 4-digit hexadecimal (16-bit) number. For example BBC Radio 1 has PI code C201. (The number itself is usually not displayed on radio receivers.)

PI codes are not globally unique; ranges are assigned per-country, and are re-used in countries beyond FM radio range of each other. For example, the first digit "C" as used in the BBC PI code example is used by the United Kingdom, Lithuania, Croatia, and Malta. They can be made globally unique by combining them with an ECC (extended country code).

PI codes are also used in Digital Audio Broadcasting as Station ID, and by the RadioDNS standard.
