= 201st Infantry Division (German Empire) =

- Active: February 1917 to November 1918
- Country: German Empire
- Type: Infantry Division

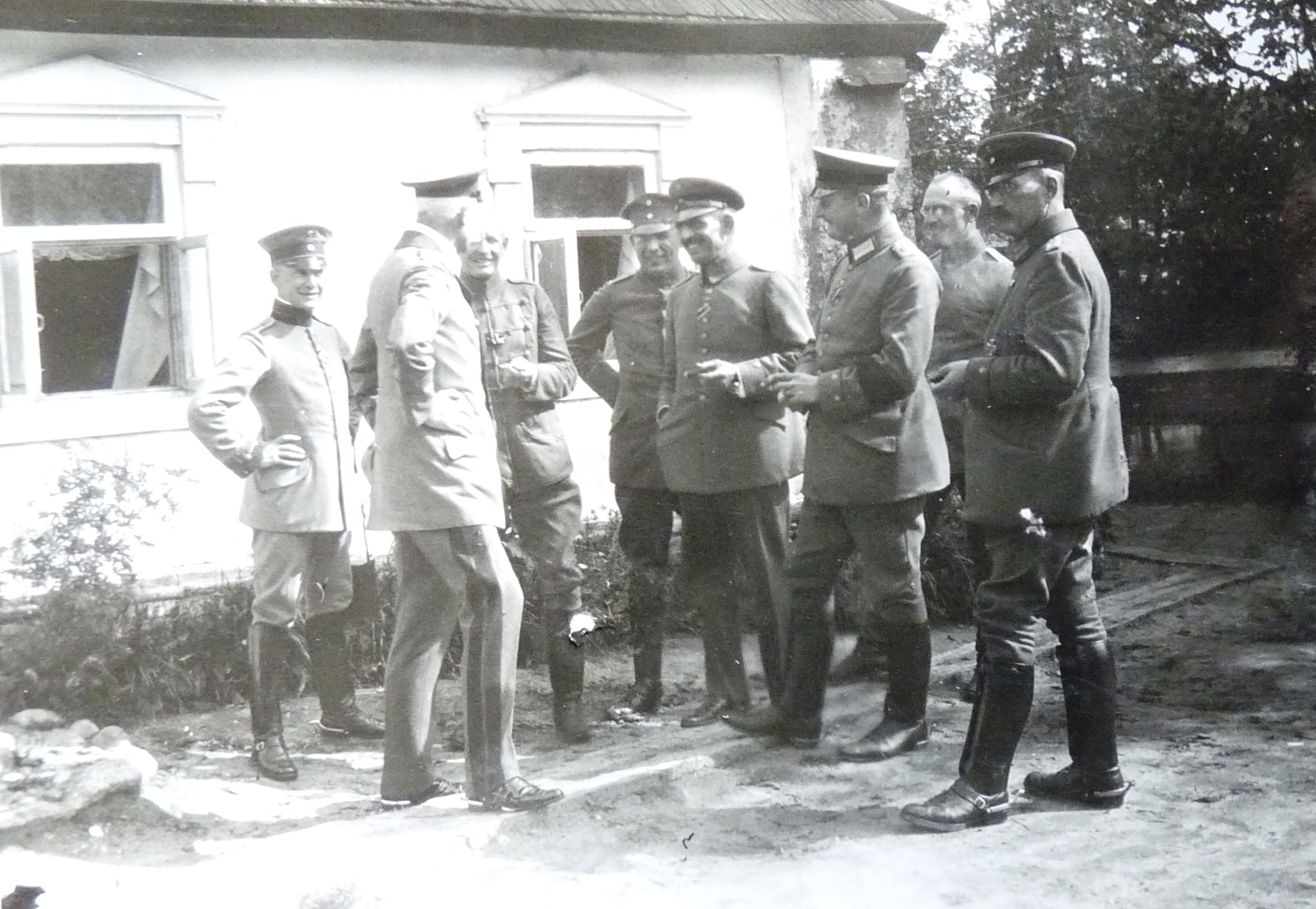

The 201st Division was a military unit of the German Empire during World War I. The division was formed in 1916 and served on both the Eastern and Western fronts.

== History ==
The 201st Division was established on January 17, 1916, as part of the German Army's expansion of its forces on the Eastern Front. The division was mainly composed of troops from the Kingdom of Württemberg, a state in southern Germany, and was part of the 17th Army Corps.

In the spring of 1916, the 201st Division participated in the Battle of Kowel, a major offensive by the Central Powers against Russian forces in modern-day Ukraine. The division also took part in the Brusilov Offensive, a massive Russian offensive that began in June 1916 and pushed the Austro-Hungarian and German armies back.

In 1917, the division was transferred to the Western Front, where it fought in the Battle of Arras and the Battle of Passchendaele. The division also participated in the German Spring Offensive of 1918, which was an attempt to break the stalemate on the Western Front.

The division suffered heavy losses during the war, with an estimated 20,000 soldiers killed or wounded. After the Armistice of 11 November 1918, the division was disbanded as part of the demobilization of the German Army.

== Commanders ==
Rank	Name	Date
Generalleutnant	Georg von Fuchs	January 1916 – March 1918
Generalmajor	Kurt von Sandrart	March 1918 – April 1918
Generalleutnant	Wilhelm Biehler	April 1918 – November 1918

== Legacy ==
The division is commemorated in the Württemberg State Library in Stuttgart, which holds the division's war diary and other documents.
