= Stratified charge engine =

Type of internal combustion engine

A stratified charge engine describes a certain type of internal combustion engine, usually a spark ignition (SI) engine that can be used in trucks, automobiles, portable and stationary equipment. The term "stratified charge" refers to the working fluids and fuel vapors entering the cylinder. Usually the fuel is injected into the cylinder or enters as a fuel rich vapor where a spark or other means are used to initiate ignition where the fuel rich zone interacts with the air to promote complete combustion. A stratified charge can allow for slightly higher compression ratios without "knock," and leaner air/fuel ratio than in conventional internal combustion engines.

Conventionally, a four-stroke (petrol or gasoline) Otto cycle engine is fueled by drawing a mixture of air and fuel into the combustion chamber during the intake stroke. This produces a homogeneous charge: a homogeneous mixture of air and fuel, which is ignited by a spark plug at a predetermined moment near the top of the compression stroke.

In a homogeneous charge system, the air/fuel ratio is kept very close to stoichiometric, meaning it contains the exact amount of air necessary for complete combustion of the fuel. This gives stable combustion, but it places an upper limit on the engine's efficiency: any attempt to improve fuel economy by running a much leaner mixture (less fuel or more air) with a homogeneous charge results in slower combustion and a higher engine temperature; this impacts on power and emissions, notably increasing nitrogen oxides or NO_{x}.

In simple terms a stratified charge engine creates a richer mixture of fuel near the spark and a leaner mixture throughout the rest of the combustion chamber. The rich mixture ignites easily and in turn ignites the lean mixture throughout the rest of the chamber; ultimately allowing the engine to use a leaner mixture thus improving efficiency while ensuring complete combustion.

== Advantages ==
=== Higher compression ratio ===
A higher mechanical compression ratio, or dynamic compression ratio with forced induction, can be used to improve thermodynamic efficiency. Because fuel is not injected into the combustion chamber until just before the combustion is required to begin, there is little risk of pre-ignition or engine knock.

=== Leaner burn ===
The engine can also run on a much leaner overall air/fuel ratio, using stratified charge, in which a small charge of a rich fuel mixture is ignited first and used to improve combustion of a larger charge of a lean fuel mixture.

== Disadvantages ==
Disadvantages include:

- Increased injector cost and complexity
- Higher fuel pressure requirements
- Increased NO_{x} formation, due to the presence of extremely lean zones and high local heat. These zones are not usually present in a gasoline engine, because the air and fuel is better mixed.

== Combustion management ==
Combustion can be problematic if a lean mixture is present at the spark plug. However, fueling a petrol engine directly allows more fuel to be directed towards the spark-plug than elsewhere in the combustion-chamber. This results in a stratified charge: one in which the air/fuel ratio is not homogeneous throughout the combustion-chamber, but varies in a controlled (and potentially quite complex) way across the volume of the cylinder.

Charge stratification can also be achieved where there is no 'in cylinder' stratification: the inlet mixture can be so lean that it is unable to be ignited by the limited energy provided by a conventional spark plug. This exceptionally lean mixture can, however, be ignited by the use of a conventional mixture strength of 12-15:1, in the case of a petrol fuelled engine, being fed into a small combustion chamber adjacent to and connected to the main lean-mixture chamber. The large flame front from this burning mixture is sufficient to combust the charge. It can be seen from this method of charge stratification that the lean charge is 'burnt' and the engine utilising this form of stratification is no longer subject to ' knock' or uncontrolled combustion. The fuel being burnt in the lean charge is therefore not 'knock' or octane restricted. This type of stratification therefore can utilise a wide variety of fuels; the specific energy output being dependent only on the calorific value of the fuel.

A relatively rich air/fuel mixture is directed to the spark-plug using multi-hole injectors. This mixture is sparked, giving a strong, even and predictable flame-front. This in turn results in a high-quality combustion of the much weaker mixture elsewhere in the cylinder.

== Comparison with diesel engine ==
Both compression ignition (CI) engines (diesel) and stratified charge engines makes use of a diffusion flame to create local hot spots that promote complete combustion and minimise unburnt hydrocarbons and carbon monoxide, reducing fuel consumption while maintaining efficiency. This often also increases NOx and particle matter, throwing emissions out of balance, resulting in a three-way catalytic converter not working well, hence diesels utilise Exhaust gas recirculation and particle filters. The most visible differences between CI and Stratified charge engines, lie in the engine head geometry. Where a diesel engine has its injector in the centre to induce swirl and reduce wall-wetting. A stratified charge engine has an injector off to the side, with a spark plug in the centre, which in some stratified engine cases, can inject fuel through the spark plug, to make the area immediatelyy around the spark plug rich, emulating the rich-lean gradient present in diesel engines. Typically stratified charge engines are used to mimick the performance benefits of compression ignition engines, in cheaper spark-ignition engines, primarily for alternative fuels.

It is worth comparing contemporary direct injection, spark-ignition petrol engines with direct-injection compression-ignition diesel engines. Petrol has a higher flame propagation speed and so burns faster than diesel fuel, allowing higher maximum engine speeds and thus greater maximum power for sporting engines. When the fuel is evenly mixed throughout the air when ignition starts, a premixed flame occurs, which is generally much faster than the diffusion flame present in compression ignition engines engines. Diesel fuel being less volatile with a higher energy density, allow for higher combustion pressures, meaning it can use higher compression ratios to achieve more torque and higher thermodynamic efficiency by comparison.

== History ==
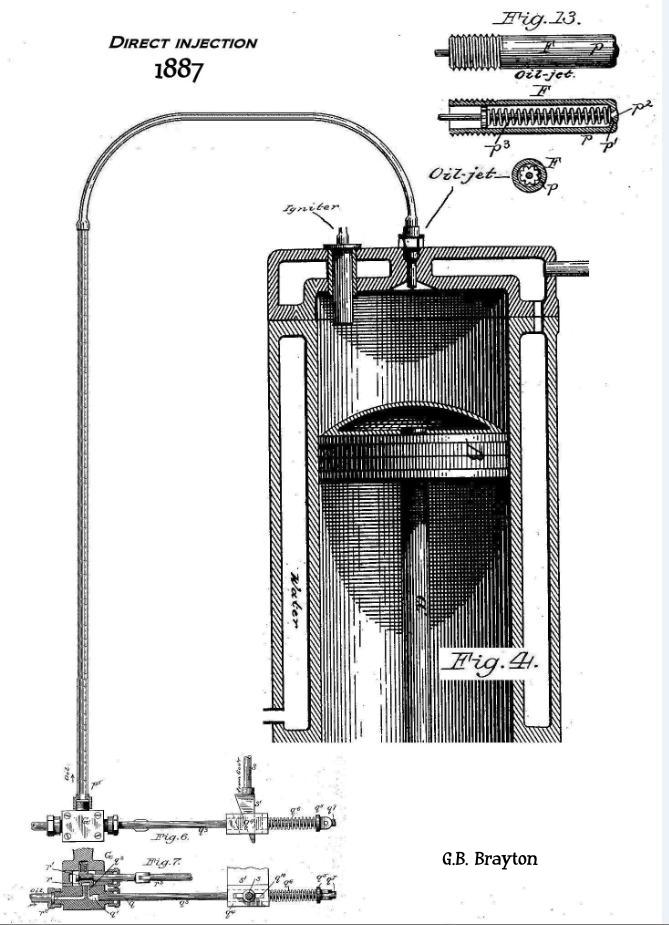
Brayton direct injection 1887

The principle of injecting fuel directly into the combustion chamber at the moment at which combustion is required to start was first invented by George Brayton in 1887, but it has been used to good effect in petrol engines for a long time. Brayton describes his invention as follows: "I have discovered that heavy oils can be mechanically converted into a finely-divided condition within a firing portion of the cylinder, or in a communicating firing chamber." Another part reads "I have for the first time, so far as my knowledge extends, regulated speed by variably controlling the direct discharge of liquid fuel into the combustion chamber or cylinder into a finely-divided condition highly favorable to immediate combustion". This was the first engine to use a lean burn system to regulate engine speed / output. In this manner the engine fired on every power stroke and speed / output was controlled solely by the quantity of fuel injected.

=== Ricardo ===
Harry Ricardo first began working with the idea of a lean burn "stratified charge" engine in the early 1900s. In the 1920s he made improvements on his earlier designs.

=== Hesselman ===
An early example of gasoline direct injection was the Hesselman engine invented by Swedish engineer Jonas Hesselman in 1925. Hesselman engines used the ultra lean burn principle and injected the fuel in the end of the compression stroke and then ignited it with a spark plug, it was often started on gasoline and then switched over to run on diesel or kerosene. The Texaco Controlled Combustion System (TCCS) was a multifuel system developed in the 1950s which closely resembled the Hesselman design. The TCCS was tested in UPS delivery vans and was found to have an overall increase in economy of about 35%.

=== Honda ===
Honda's CVCC engine, released in the early 1970s models of Civic, then Accord and City later in the decade, is a form of stratified charge engine that had wide market acceptance for considerable time. The CVCC system had conventional inlet and exhaust valves and a third, supplementary, inlet valve that charged an area around the spark plug. The spark plug and CVCC inlet were isolated from the main cylinder by a perforated metal plate. At ignition a series of flame fronts shot into the very lean main charge, through the perforations, ensuring complete ignition. In the Honda City Turbo such engines produced a high power-to-weight ratio at engine speeds of 7,000 rpm and above.

=== Jaguar ===
Jaguar Cars in the 1980s developed the Jaguar V12 engine, H.E. (so called High Efficiency) version, which fit in the Jaguar XJ12 and Jaguar XJS models and used a stratified charge design called the 'May Fireball' in order to reduce the engine's very heavy fuel consumption..

=== Vespa ===
The Vespa ET2 scooter had a 50 cc two-stroke engine in which air was admitted through the transfer port and a rich fuel mixture was injected into the cylinder near the spark plug just before ignition. The injection system was purely mechanical, using a timed pumping cylinder and a non-return valve.

On its downward stroke it compresses the rich mixture to about 70 psi at which time the rising pressure raises a spring loaded poppet valve off its seat and the charge is squirted into the cylinder. There it is aimed at the spark plug area and ignited. The combustion pressure immediately shuts the spring-loaded poppet valve and from then on its (sic) just a "regular" stratified-charge ignition process with the flame front igniting those lean mixture areas in the cylinder.

=== Volkswagen ===
Volkswagen currently uses stratified charge on its direct injection 1.0, 1.2, 1.4, 1.5, 1.8 and 2.0 litres TFSI (Turbo fuel stratified injection) gasoline engines, in combination with turbocharging.

=== Mercedes-Benz ===
Mercedes-Benz has been employing stratified charge engines with its Blue DIRECT system.

With the stratified-charge application, the 3.0L V-6 will continue to employ direct fuel injection, but the injectors have been redesigned to spray under higher pressure later in the intake stroke, just before compression, and the fuel is shaped to arrive in certain areas within the cylinder to optimize combustion. This strategy makes for an air-fuel mix within the chamber that is much leaner than with a conventional homogeneous-charge system that fills the chamber more uniformly before combustion.

== Research ==
SAE International has published papers on experimental work with stratified charge engines.

== TFSI engines ==
Turbo fuel stratified injection (TFSI) is a trademark of the Volkswagen Group for a type of forced-aspiration ("turbo") engine where the fuel is pressure-injected straight into the combustion chamber in such a way as to create a stratified charge. FSI direct injection technology increases the torque and power of spark-ignition engines, makes them as much as 15 percent more economical and reduces exhaust emissions.

=== Advantages ===
Some advantages of TFSI engines:

1. Better fuel distribution and better fuel charge inside the combustion chamber
2. During the injection process the fuel gets evaporated, cooling the cylinder chamber
3. Cooling effect of the pressurized fuel allows for use of a lower octane fuel leading to a cost savings for the end user
4. Higher compression ratios, which translates into more power
5. Increased fuel combustion efficiency
6. Higher power during pick-up of vehicle

=== Disadvantages ===
1. Carbon build up behind the intake valves. Since fuel is directly injected inside the combustion chamber, it never gets a chance to wash any contaminants behind the valves. This results in excessive carbon build up over time, hindering performance. Some engines (like Toyota's Dynamic Force engines) combine direct injection with traditional multi port fuel injection to ameliorate this problem.
2. More expensive - much higher pressure fuel pumps are required to inject the fuel directly into the cylinder. This requires fuel pressures of up to 200 bar, much greater than a traditional multiport injection setup (see direct injection)

== See also ==
- Lean-burn
