= 201 BC =

201 BC in various calendars
Gregorian calendar	201 BC; CCI BC
Ab urbe condita	553
Ancient Egypt era	XXXIII dynasty, 123
Pharaoh	Ptolemy V Epiphanes, 3
Ancient Greek Olympiad (summer)	144th Olympiad, year 4
Assyrian calendar	4550
Balinese saka calendar	N/A
Bengali calendar	−794 – −793
Berber calendar	750
Buddhist calendar	344
Burmese calendar	−838
Byzantine calendar	5308–5309
Chinese calendar	己亥年 (Earth Pig); 2497 or 2290 — to — 庚子年 (Metal Rat); 2498 or 2291
Coptic calendar	−484 – −483
Discordian calendar	966
Ethiopian calendar	−208 – −207
Hebrew calendar	3560–3561
- Hindu calendars
Vikram Samvat	−144 – −143
Shaka Samvat	N/A
Kali Yuga	2900–2901
Holocene calendar	9800
Iranian calendar	822 BP – 821 BP
Islamic calendar	847 BH – 846 BH
Javanese calendar	N/A
Julian calendar	N/A
Korean calendar	2133
Minguo calendar	2112 before ROC 民前2112年
Nanakshahi calendar	−1668
Seleucid era	111/112 AG
Thai solar calendar	342–343
Tibetan calendar	阴土猪年 (female Earth-Pig) −74 or −455 or −1227 — to — 阳金鼠年 (male Iron-Rat) −73 or −454 or −1226

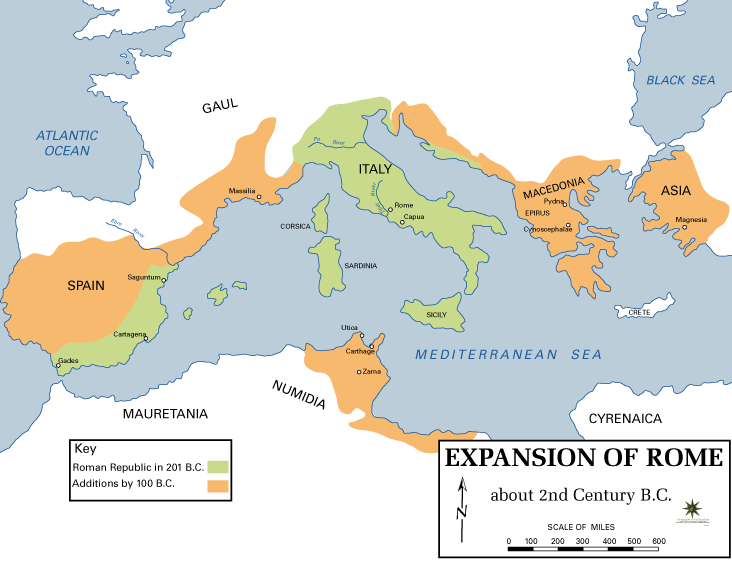
The Roman Republic in 201 BC (in light green)

Year 201 BC was a year of the pre-Julian Roman calendar. At the time it was known as the Year of the Consulship of Lentulus and Paetus (or, less frequently, year 553 Ab urbe condita). The denomination 201 BC for this year has been used since the early medieval period, when the Anno Domini calendar era became the prevalent method in Europe for naming years.

== Events ==
=== By place ===
==== Carthage ====
- On Hannibal's advice, Carthage sues for peace with the Romans, ending the Second Punic War. Carthage is reduced to a client state of Rome. In the peace treaty between Carthage and Rome, Carthage surrenders all her Mediterranean possessions to Rome, including her Iberian territories. The Carthaginians agree to pay Rome 200 talents per year for 50 years, allow Masinissa to rule Numidia as an independent kingdom, make no war without Rome's permission, and destroy all but 10 of the Carthaginian warships.
- Following the conclusion of the peace with Rome, Hannibal is elected as suffet, or chief magistrate, of Carthage. The office has over the years become insignificant in Carthaginian politics, but Hannibal restores its power and authority. He sets out to reform the administration and finances of Carthage and reduce the power of the oligarchy which has ruled Carthage before and during the Second Punic War.

==== Roman Republic ====
- The Romans oust the Carthaginians from Malta.
- In Rome, according to the Roman historian Livy, land is distributed to veterans of the Second Punic War. This is the first documented instance of a practice that later becomes commonplace.

==== Greece ====
- Philip V of Macedon captures Samos and the Egyptian fleet stationed there. He then besieges Chios to the north.
- Rhodes and its allies Pergamum, Cyzicus, and Byzantium combine their fleets and defeat Philip V in the Battle of Chios. His flagship is trapped and rammed by two enemy ships.
- The Spartan king, Nabis, once more invades and captures Messene. However, the Spartans are forced to retreat when the Achaean League army of Philopoemen intervenes. Nabis' forces are decisively defeated at Tegea by Philopoemen and Nabis is forced to check his expansionist ambitions for the time being.

==== China ====
- The construction of city walls around Nanchang begins.
- King Xin of Han, in alliance with Modu Chanyu of the Xiongnu, launches a rebellion against the Han dynasty in the Taiyuan Commandery. He is defeated by Emperor Gaozu of Han and his generals, who chase Xin of Han into Xiongnu territory.

== Deaths ==
- Gnaeus Naevius, Latin epic poet and dramatist of the Old Latin period, who invented a new genre of written historical plays called fabulae praetextae, which are based on Roman historical or legendary figures and events (b. c. 264 BC).
- Zhongli Mo, Chinese general during the Chu–Han Contention.
