= 201st Brigade =

201st Brigade may refer to:

== Germany ==
- 201st Security Brigade, Wehrmacht, Nazi Germany

== Ukraine ==
- 201st Anti-aircraft Missile Brigade

== United Kingdom ==
- 201st (2/1st Middlesex) Brigade, Second Line formation of the British Territorial Force during World War I
- 201st Independent Infantry Brigade (Home), British Army Home Defence formation during World War II
- 201st Guards Motor Brigade, British Army field formation during World War II

== United States ==
- 201st Expeditionary Military Intelligence Brigade, United States Army

== See also ==
- 201st Division (disambiguation)
