= Volkswagen GTI Roadster Vision Gran Turismo =

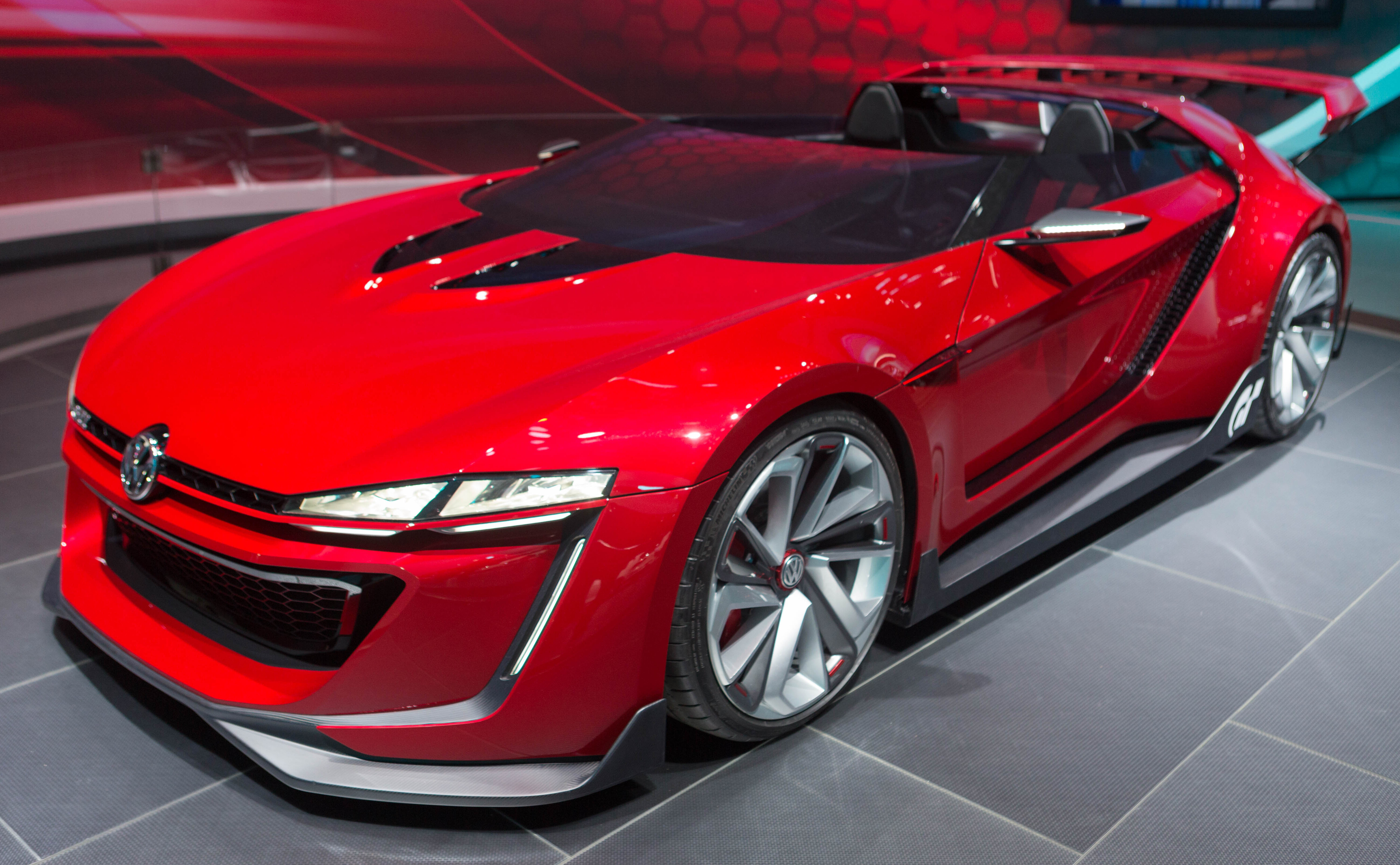

Overview
- Manufacturer: Volkswagen
- Production: 2014

Body and chassis
- Body style: 2-door roadster
- Layout: Front-engine, four-wheel-drive (4MOTION); Rear mid-engine, rear-wheel drive (GTI Vision Gran Turismo Gr.3)

Powertrain
- Engine: 3.0 L VR6 Twin-Turbo FSI
- Transmission: 7-speed DSG with sports programming

Dimensions
- Wheelbase: 2,490 mm (98 in)
- Length: 4,180 mm (165 in)
- Width: 1,900 mm (75 in)
- Height: 1,009 mm (40 in)
- Curb weight: 1,420 kg (3,131 lb)

The Volkswagen GTI Roadster Vision Gran Turismo is a concept car developed by Volkswagen in 2014.

== Development ==
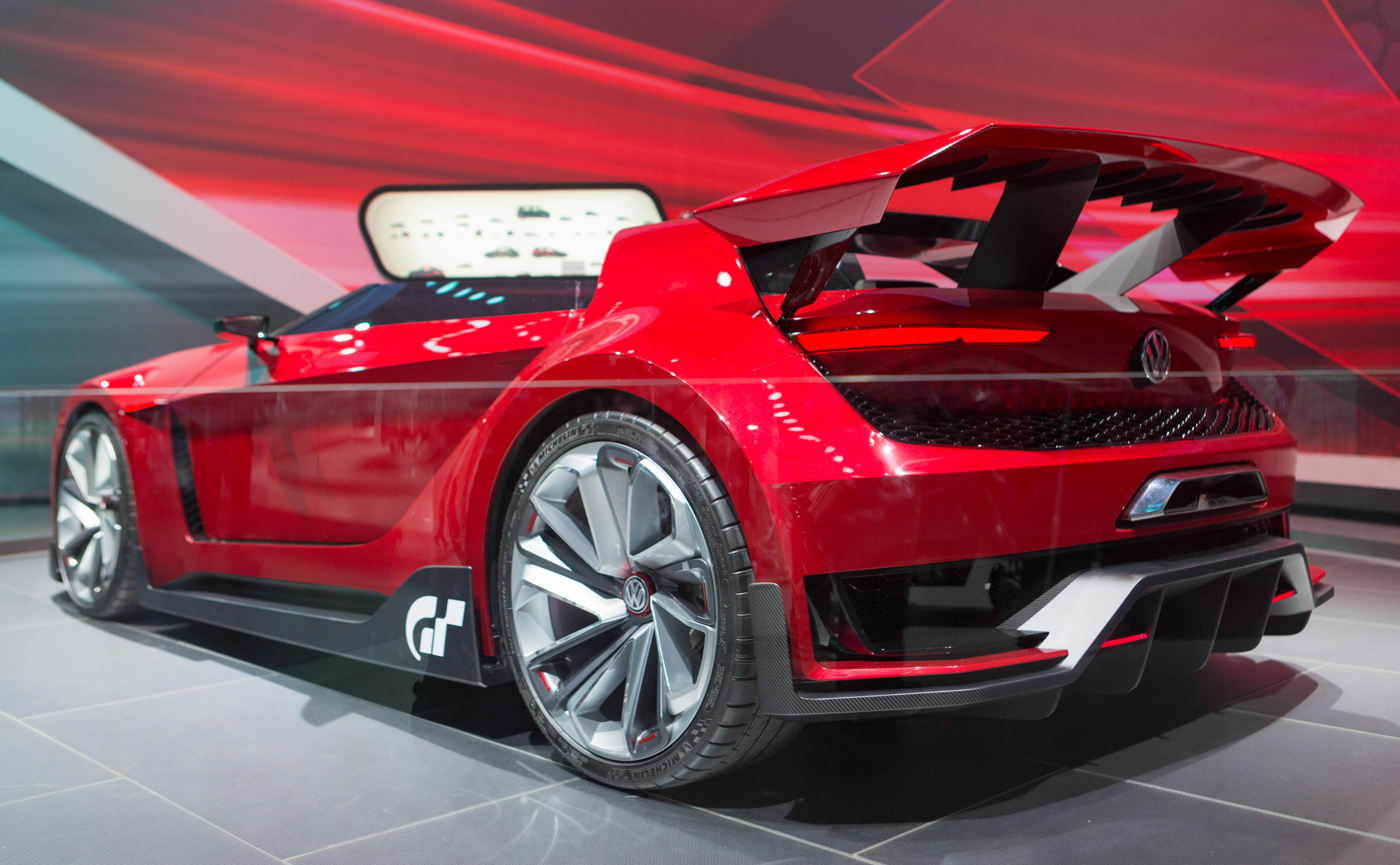
Rear view

The concept car, presented at Worthersee Treffen 2014, originated from another prototype, the Vision GTI, born from a competition created for Volkswagen's young designers and wanted by the Wolfsburg style manager, Klaus Bischoff; this was in response to Sony's invitation to build a Volkswagen that would celebrate the first fifteen years of the driving simulator series Gran Turismo.

== Specifications ==
The concept, as evidenced by the name, features a roadster configuration, and uses a chassis formed by two shells in carbon fiber separated by a central element. Based on a modular transverse platform called MQB (Modular Querbaukasten), the GTI Roadster Vision was equipped with a 3.0 V6 engine TSI with twin-turbochargers, producing 503 hp (375 kW) and 413 lb⋅ft (560 N⋅m) of torque. Power was sent to a 4Motion all-wheel drive system through a 7-speed DSG dual clutch transmission. This allowed for an acceleration from 0 to 100 km/h (62 mph) in 3.6 seconds, with a maximum speed of 309 km/h (192 mph). The tires are size 235/35 at the front and 275/30 at the rear, with 20 inch wheels.

== Media ==
The GTI is featured in the Polyphony Digital games Gran Turismo 6, Gran Turismo Sport, and Gran Turismo 7.

== See also ==
- Vision Gran Turismo
