= Volkswagen Tavendor =

Chinese full-size crossover SUV produced by German brand

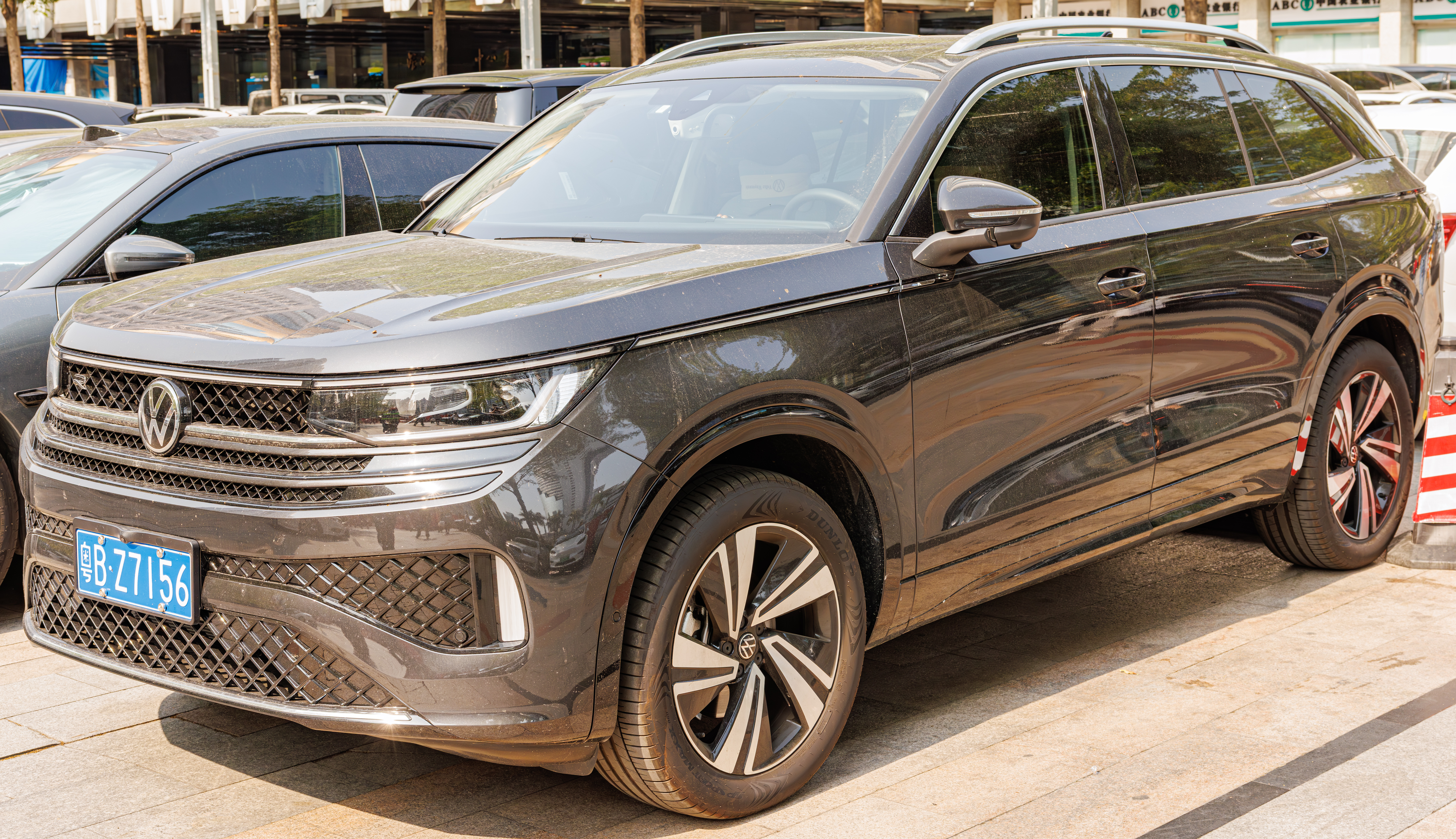
- Volkswagen Tavendor

Overview
- Manufacturer: Volkswagen
- Production: 2022–present
- Assembly: China: Tianjin (FAW-VW)

Body and chassis
- Class: Mid-size SUV
- Body style: 5-door crossover SUV
- Layout: Front-engine, front-wheel-drive; Front-engine, all-wheel-drive
- Platform: Volkswagen Group MQB Evo
- Related: Volkswagen Teramont/Atlas; Volkswagen Talagon; Audi Q6; Volkswagen Viloran

Powertrain
- Engine: Petrol: 2.0 L EA888 DPL TSI I4; 2.0 L EA888 DKX TSI I4
- Power output: 137 kW (183 hp; 186 PS) (2.0L '330 TSI'); 162 kW (217 hp; 220 PS) (2.0L '380 TSI')
- Transmission: 7-speed DSG

Dimensions
- Wheelbase: 2,980 mm (117.3 in)
- Length: 4,936 mm (194.3 in); 5,007 mm (197.1 in) (Facelift)
- Width: 2,015 mm (79.3 in)
- Height: 1,756 mm (69.1 in); 1,763 mm (69.4 in) (Facelift)

The Volkswagen Tavendor (Chinese: 大众揽巡; pinyin: Dàzhòng Lǎnxún) is a mid-size SUV with three-row seating manufactured by the German automaker Volkswagen through FAW-Volkswagen joint venture in China since 2022. It is positioned between the larger Talagon and the smaller Tayron within FAW-Volkswagen SUV line-up.

== Overview ==
The Tavendor was unveiled in August 2022. It is based on the MQB Evo architecture, sharing the similar dimensions and powertrain options with the similarly sized Teramont and the larger Talagon.

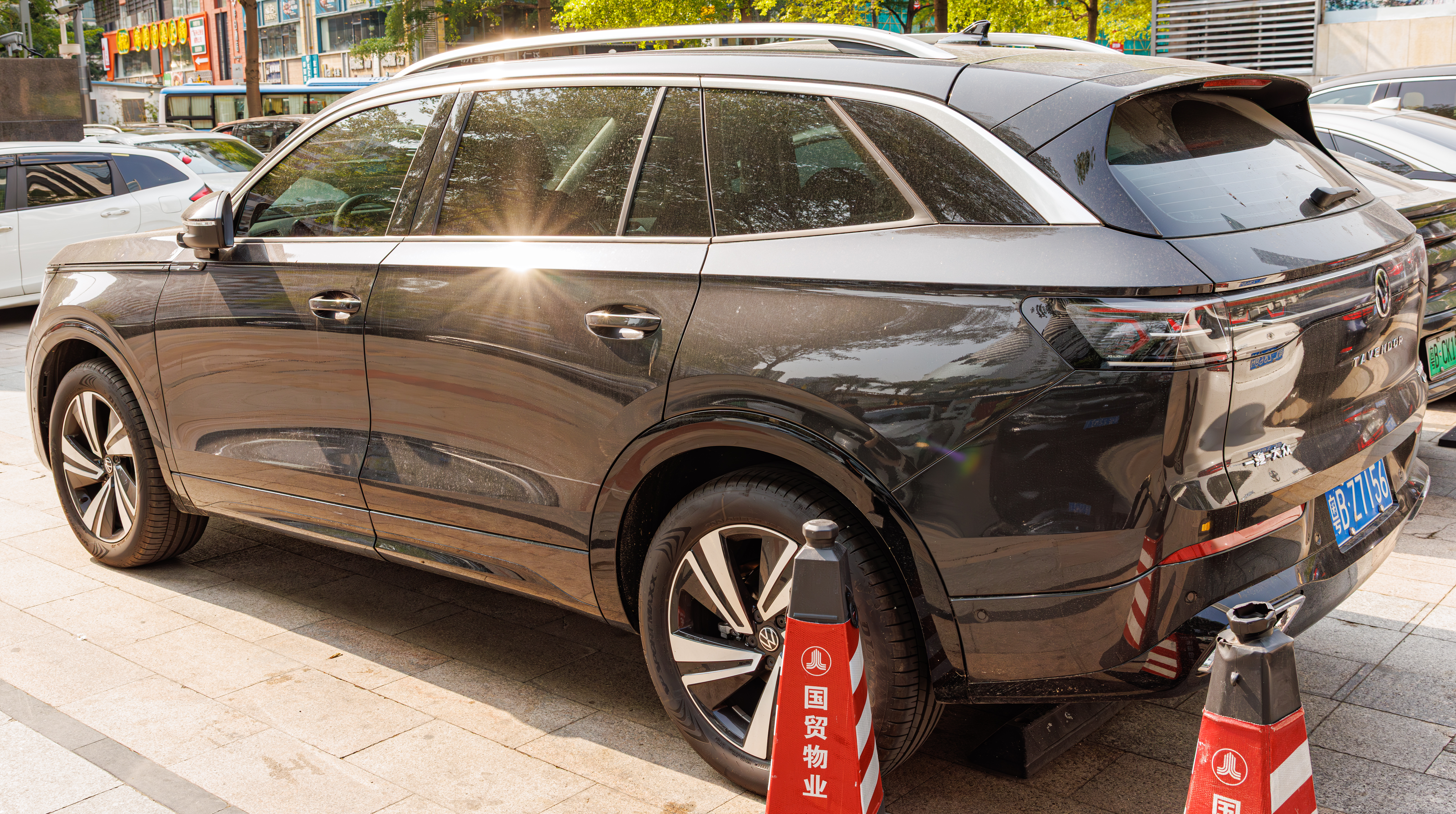
Rear view

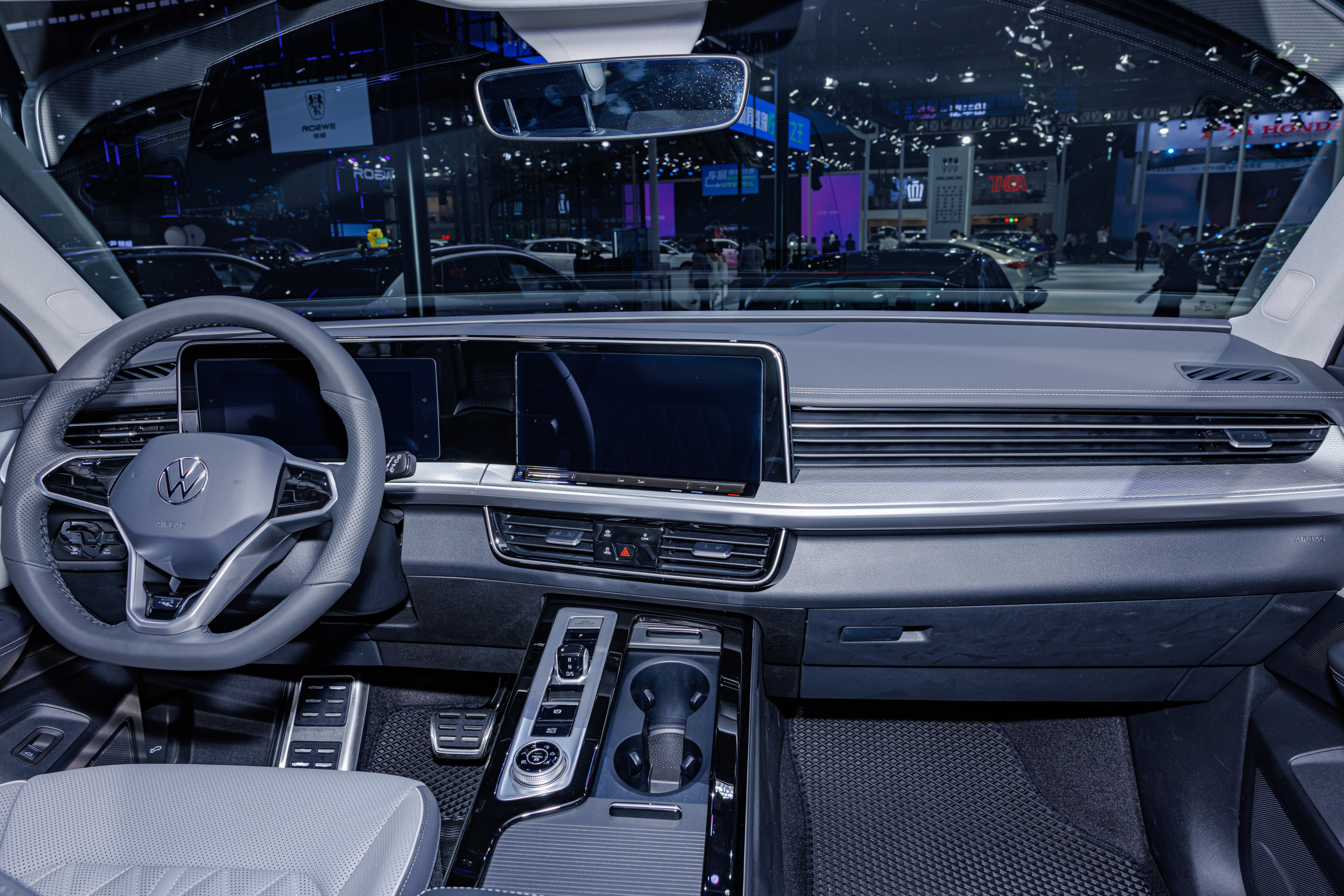
Interior

=== 2025 facelift ===
The MIIT released photos of the facelifted Tavendor on August 8, 2025. The exhaust outlets are moved, the hood features a chrome-infused shut line, and the lower grille is replaced with vertical air inlets. A new 450 TSI grade is also introduced using a 2 liter turbocharged inline 4 engine producing 270 horsepower.

The facelift model made its debut at the 2025 Guangzhou Auto Show.

The Tavendor is set to enter the Middle East market; the first Middle East-specification SUV rolled off FAW-Volkswagen's production line in Changchun, China, on 10 November 2026, with a regional launch planned for 2027.

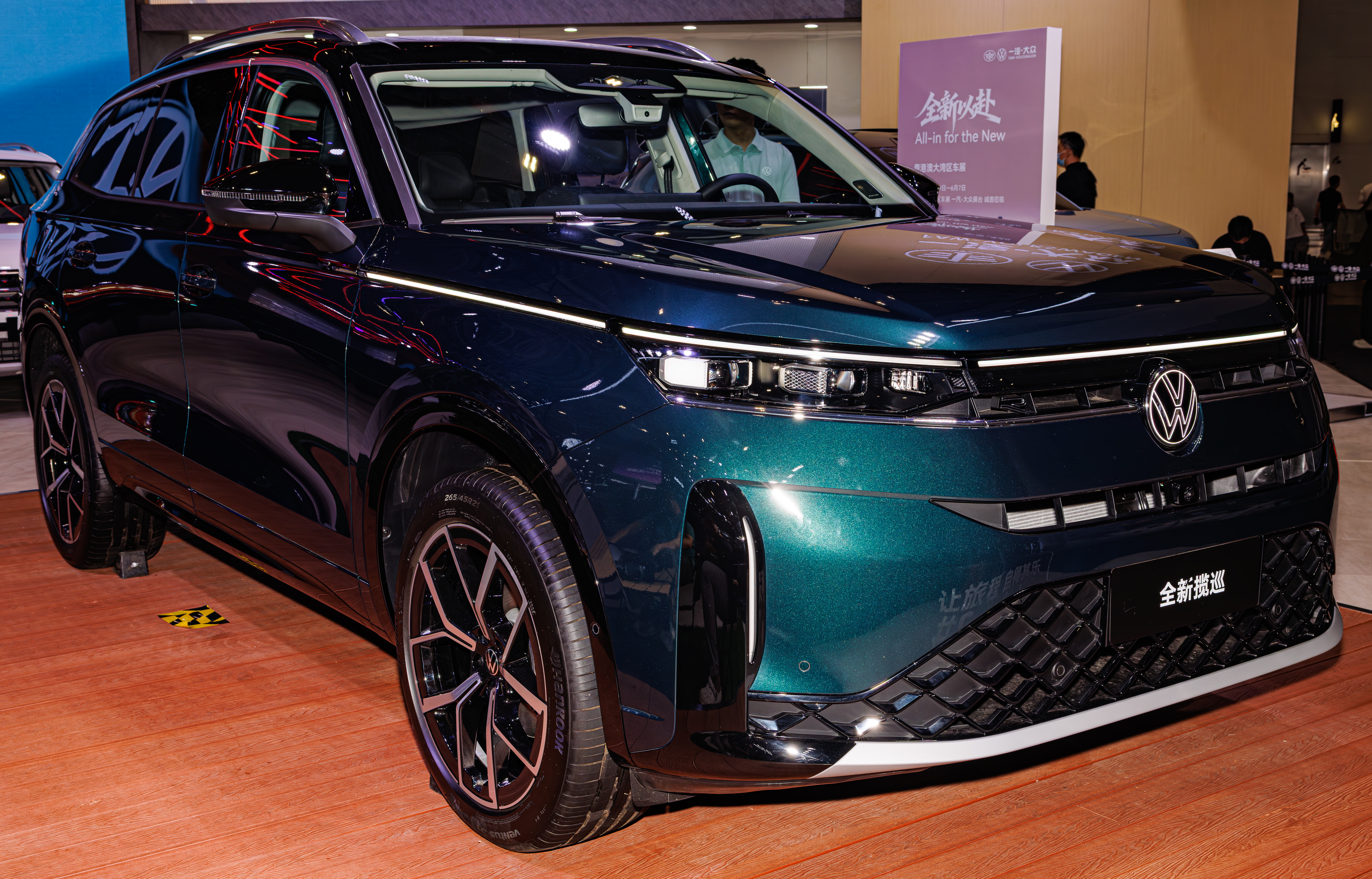
Volkswagen Tavendor 2025 facelift

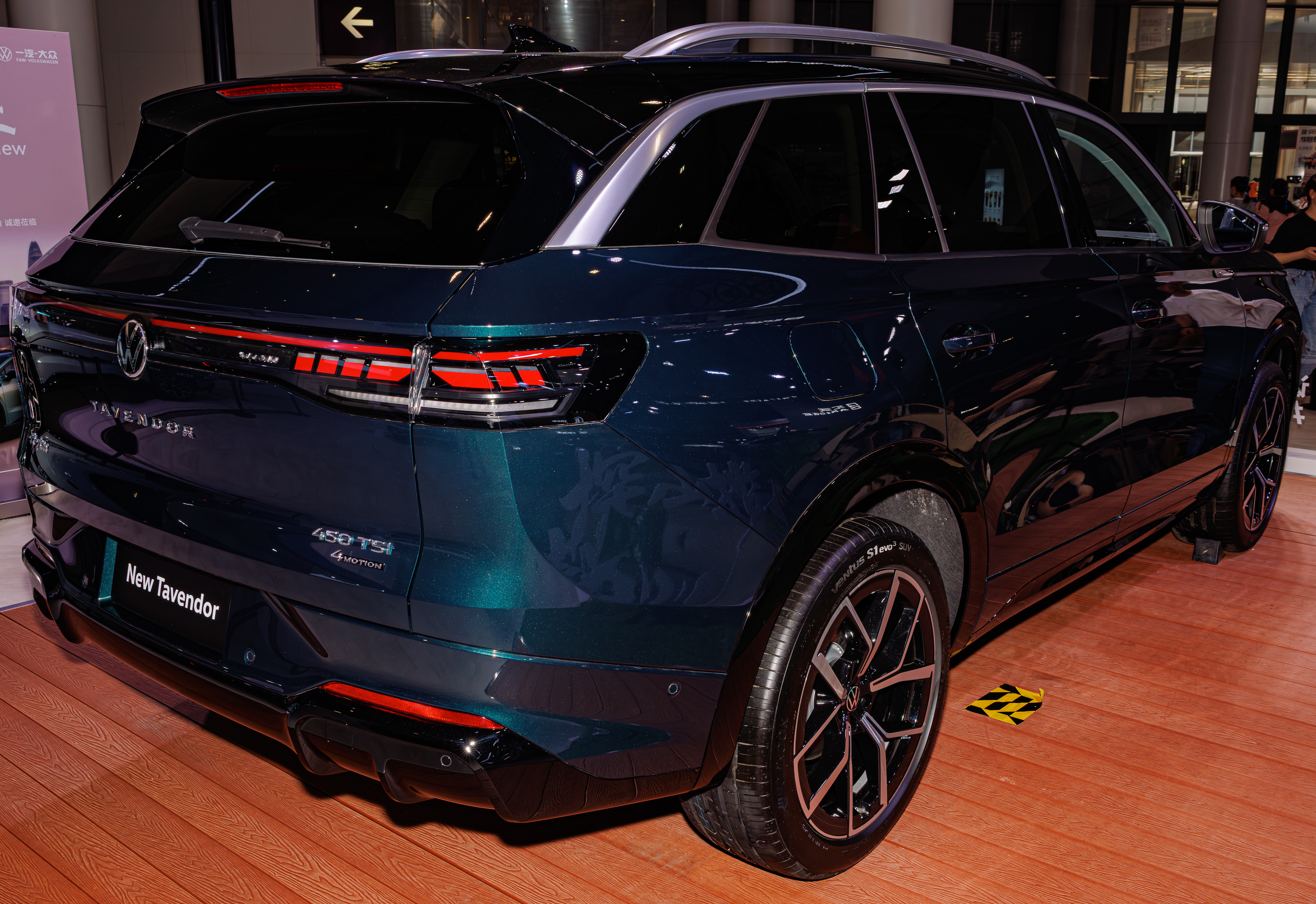
Rear view

=== Powertrain ===
The Tavendor is fitted with turbocharged 2.0-liter TSI four-cylinder engine, available in two power output options. The base model will produce 186 PS (183 hp; 137 kW), with the more powerful variant producing 220 PS (217 hp; 162 kW). Both are paired with the seven-speed DSG automatic transmission with front-wheel drive or all-wheel drive (4Motion).

Petrol engines
Model	Displacement	Series	Power	Torque	Transmission
2.0 '330 TSI'	1,984 cc (121.1 cu in) I4	EA888 (DPL)	186 PS (183 hp; 137 kW)	320 N⋅m (236 lb⋅ft)	7-speed DSG
2.0 '380 TSI'	1,984 cc (121.1 cu in) I4	EA888 (DKX)	220 PS (217 hp; 162 kW)	350 N⋅m (258 lb⋅ft)	7-speed DSG

== Sales ==
Year	China
2023	30,308
2024	34,794
2025	24,907
