= Audi Q6 =

Full-size luxury crossover SUV

Audi Q6 (China)
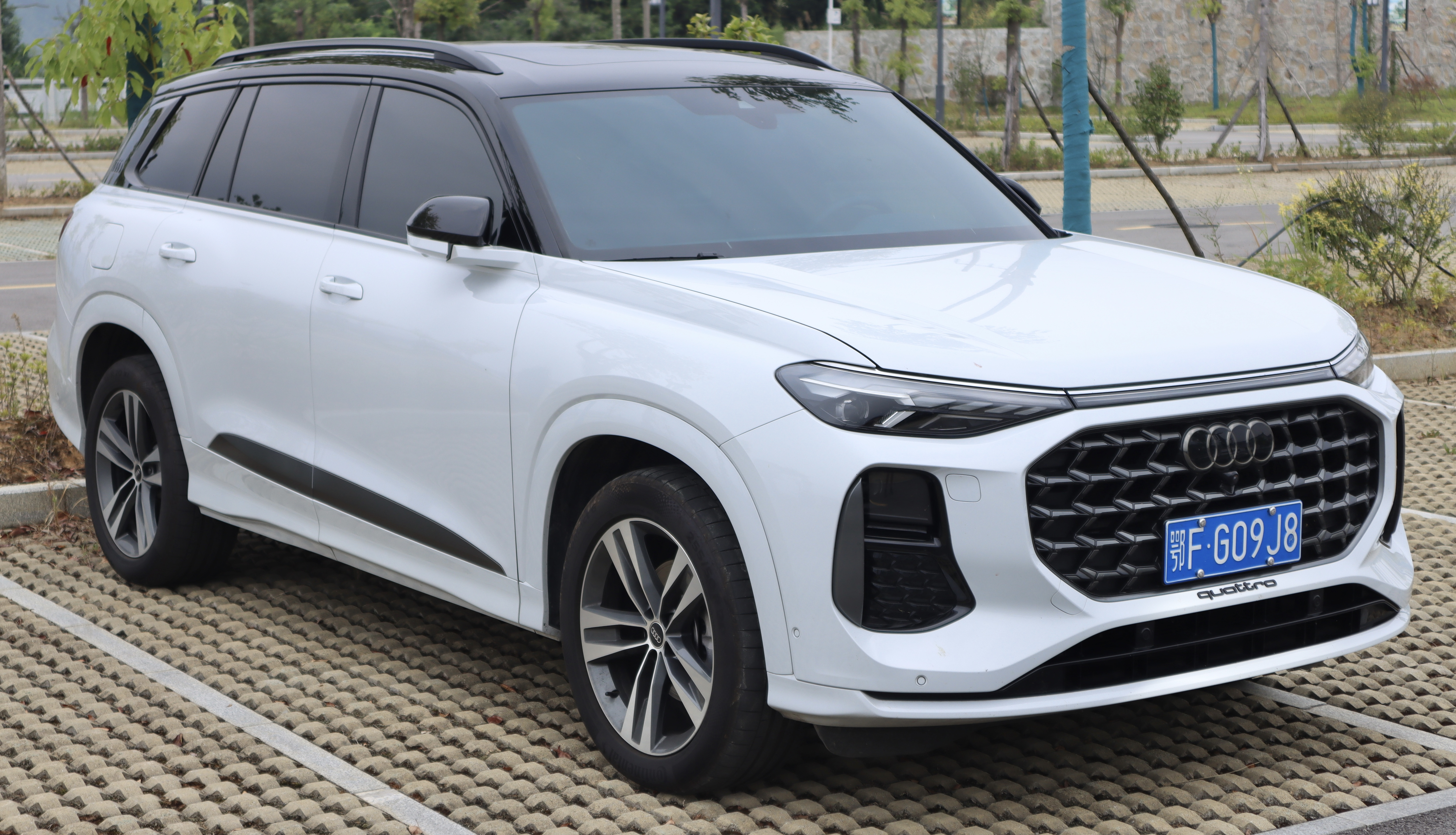

Overview
- Manufacturer: Audi AG
- Production: 2022–present
- Assembly: China: Ningbo, Zhejiang (SAIC Audi)
- Designer: Siming Yan

Body and chassis
- Class: Full-size luxury crossover SUV
- Body style: 5-door SUV
- Layout: Front-engine, all-wheel-drive (Quattro)
- Platform: Volkswagen Group MQB Evo
- Related: Volkswagen Talagon; Volkswagen Teramont/Atlas; Volkswagen Tavendor

Powertrain
- Engine: Petrol: 2.0 L EA888 TSI I4; 2.5 L EA390 VR6
- Power output: 170–221 kW (228–296 hp; 231–300 PS)
- Transmission: 7-speed S-Tronic DSG

Dimensions
- Wheelbase: 2,980 mm (117.3 in)
- Length: 5,099 mm (200.7 in)
- Width: 2,012 mm (79.2 in)
- Height: 1,784 mm (70.2 in)

The Audi Q6 is a full-size luxury crossover SUV with three-row seating produced by Audi through SAIC Audi joint venture in China since 2022. It was released in July 2022.

== Overview ==
The Audi Q6 shares the same MQB Evo platform with the similarly sized Volkswagen Talagon and Teramont/Atlas. While not a flagship model, it is the largest model currently marketed by Audi, outnumbering the Q7 and Q8 by exterior dimensions. It is mechanically unrelated to the Q6 e-tron.

Designwise, Audi officially calls the Audi Q6 a "land jet", and according to the Q6 designer Siming Yan, the exterior design of the Q6 was inspired by the kirin.

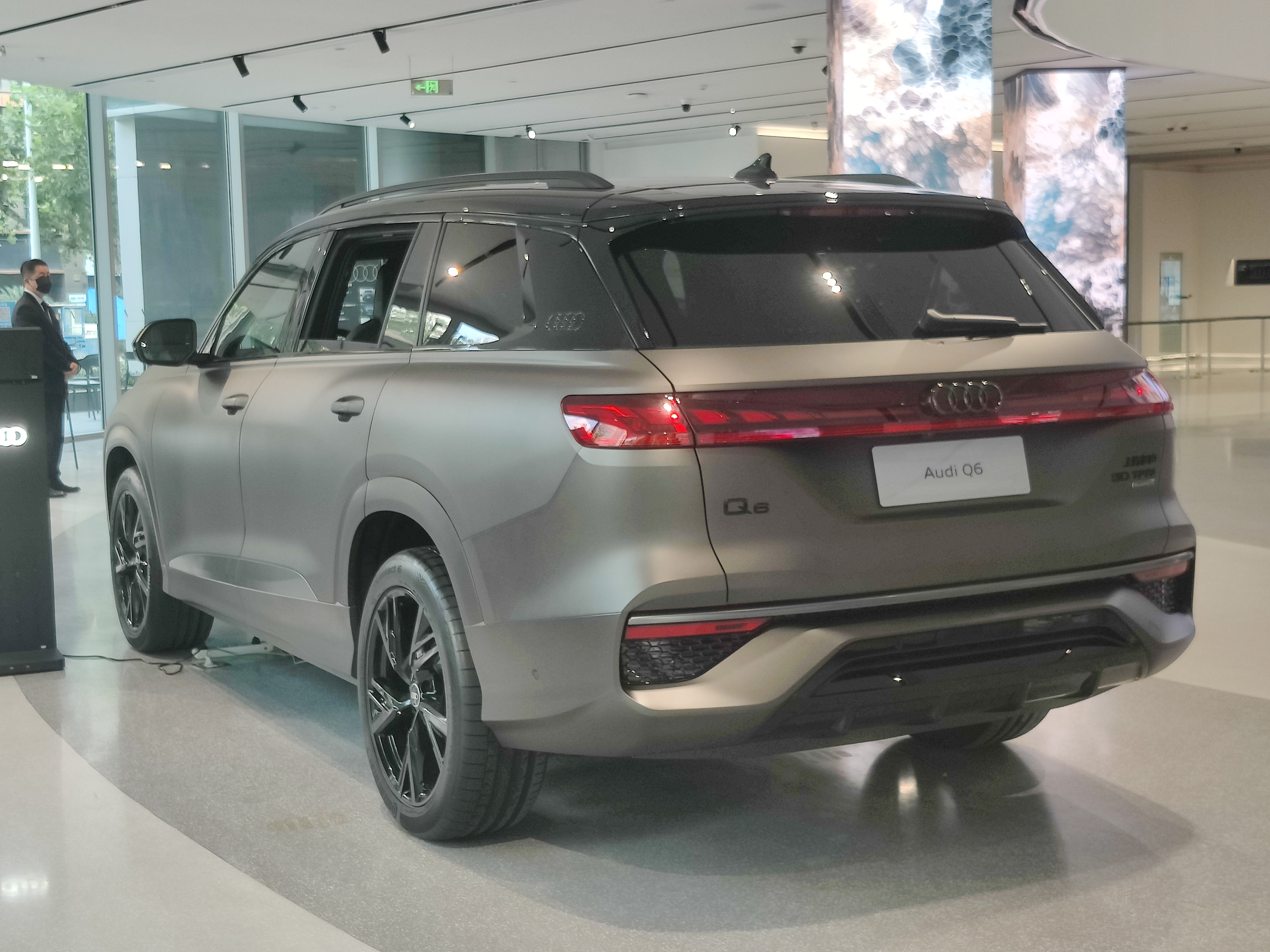
Rear view

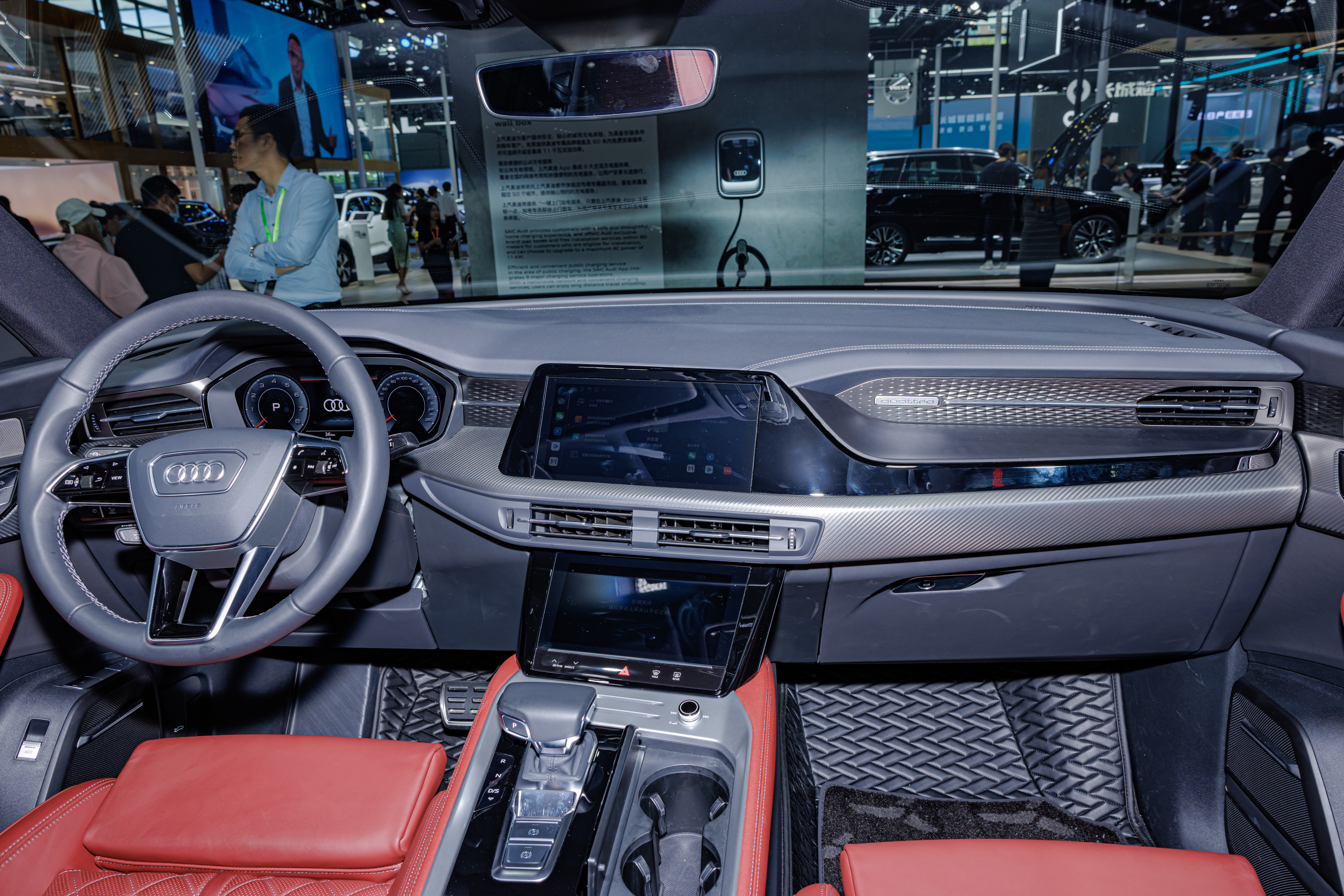
Interior

== Powertrain ==
In China, three engine options are offered, which are 2.0-litre petrol engine marketed as 40TFSI Quattro, 2.0-litre petrol engine with higher power output marketed as 45TFSI Quattro and a 2.5-litre VR6 petrol engine marketed as 50TFSI Quattro.

Petrol engines
Model	Displacement	Series	Power	Torque	Transmission
40TFSI Quattro	1,984 cc (121.1 cu in) I4	EA888	231 PS (228 hp; 170 kW)	370 N⋅m (273 lb⋅ft)	7-speed DSG
45TFSI Quattro	1,984 cc (121.1 cu in) I4	EA888	265 PS (261 hp; 195 kW)	400 N⋅m (295 lb⋅ft)	7-speed DSG
50TFSI Quattro	2,492 cc (152.1 cu in) VR6	EA390	300 PS (296 hp; 221 kW)	500 N⋅m (369 lb⋅ft)	7-speed DSG

== Sales ==
Year	China
2023	3,854
2024	5,128
2025	7,888
