= Volkswagen Talagon =

Chinese full-size crossover SUV produced by German brand

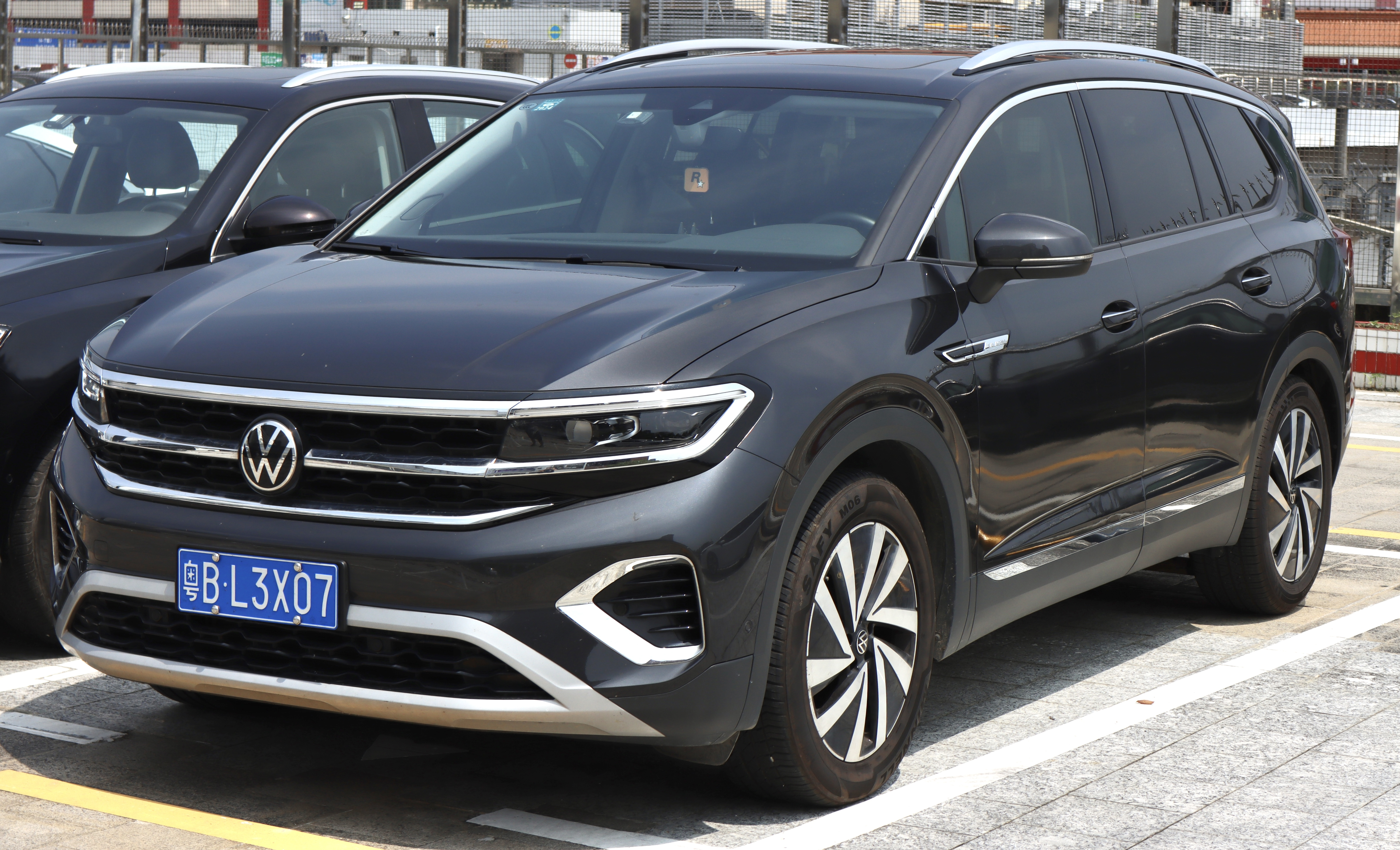
- 2021 Volkswagen Talagon

Overview
- Manufacturer: Volkswagen
- Production: 2021–present
- Assembly: China: Tianjin (FAW-VW)

Body and chassis
- Class: Full-size SUV
- Body style: 5-door crossover SUV
- Layout: Front-engine, front-wheel-drive; Front-engine, all-wheel-drive
- Platform: Volkswagen Group MQB Evo
- Related: Volkswagen Tavendor; Volkswagen Teramont/Atlas; Audi Q6; Volkswagen Viloran

Powertrain
- Engine: Petrol: 2.0 L EA888 DPL TSI I4; 2.0 L EA888 DKX TSI I4; 2.5 L EA390 DPK VR6
- Power output: 137 kW (183 hp; 186 PS) (2.0L '330 TSI'); 162 kW (217 hp; 220 PS) (2.0L '380 TSI'); 200 kW (268 hp; 272 PS) (2.0L '450 TSI'); 220 kW (295 hp; 299 PS) (2.5L '530 V6')
- Transmission: 7-speed DSG

Dimensions
- Wheelbase: 2,980 mm (117.3 in)
- Length: 5,152 mm (202.8 in); 5,168 mm (203.5 in) (Facelift)
- Width: 2,002 mm (78.8 in)
- Height: 1,795 mm (70.7 in); 1,792 mm (70.6 in) (Facelift)

The Volkswagen Talagon (Chinese: 大众揽境; pinyin: Dàzhòng Lǎnjìng) is a full-size SUV with three-row seating manufactured by the German automaker Volkswagen through FAW-Volkswagen joint venture in China since 2021. It is the largest SUV model produced by the company and also the second largest vehicle based on the MQB platform, after the Viloran minivan.

== Overview ==
The Talagon was previewed by a near-production concept vehicle called the SMV (Sport Multi-Purpose Vehicle) in April 2019. The production version was unveiled at Auto Shanghai in April 2021. The vehicle is based on the modular MQB platform in its most stretched configuration. Considered as a sister model to the Teramont/Atlas, it is slightly larger by around 110 mm (4.3 in) in length and 12 mm (0.5 in) in width.

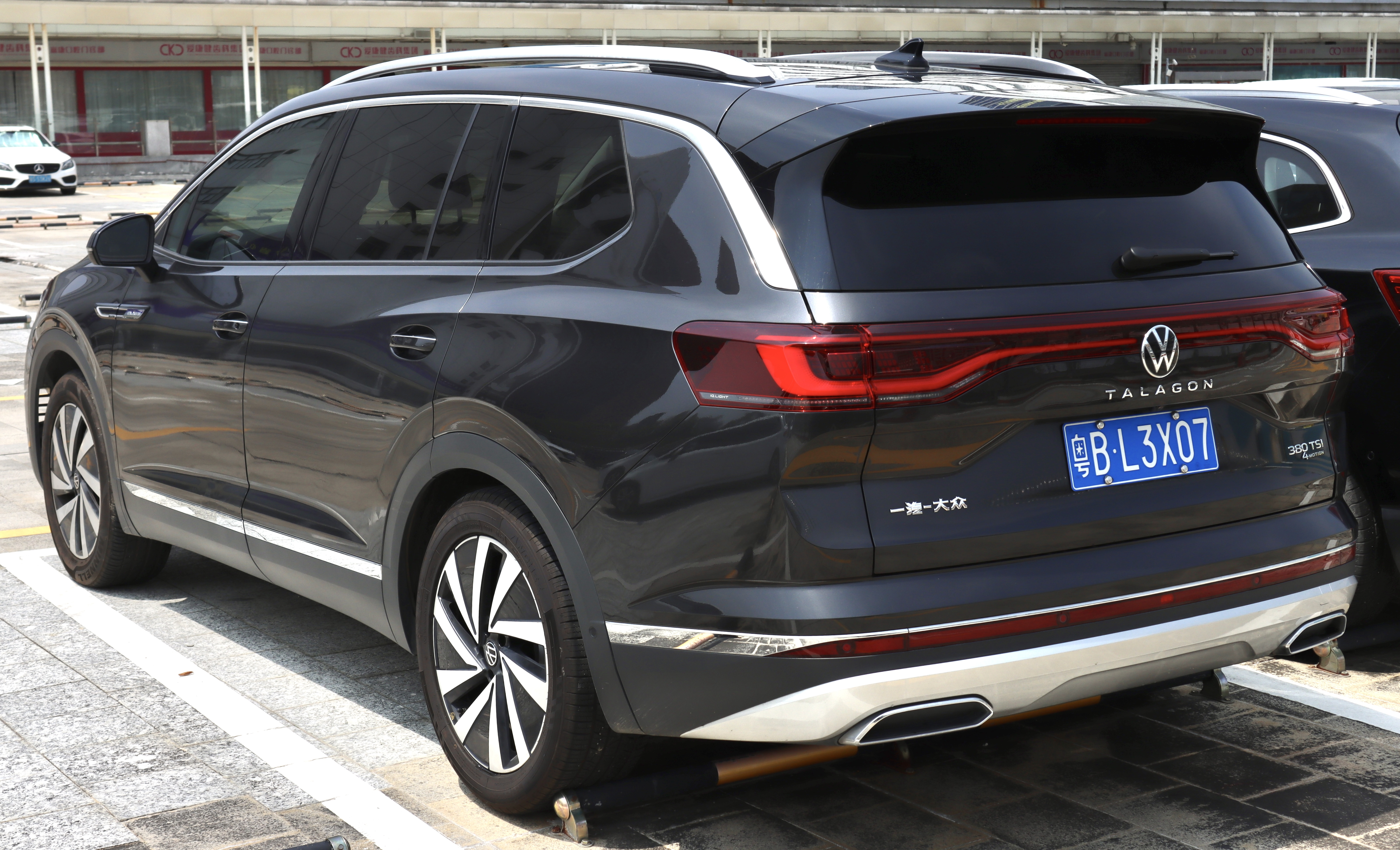
Rear view

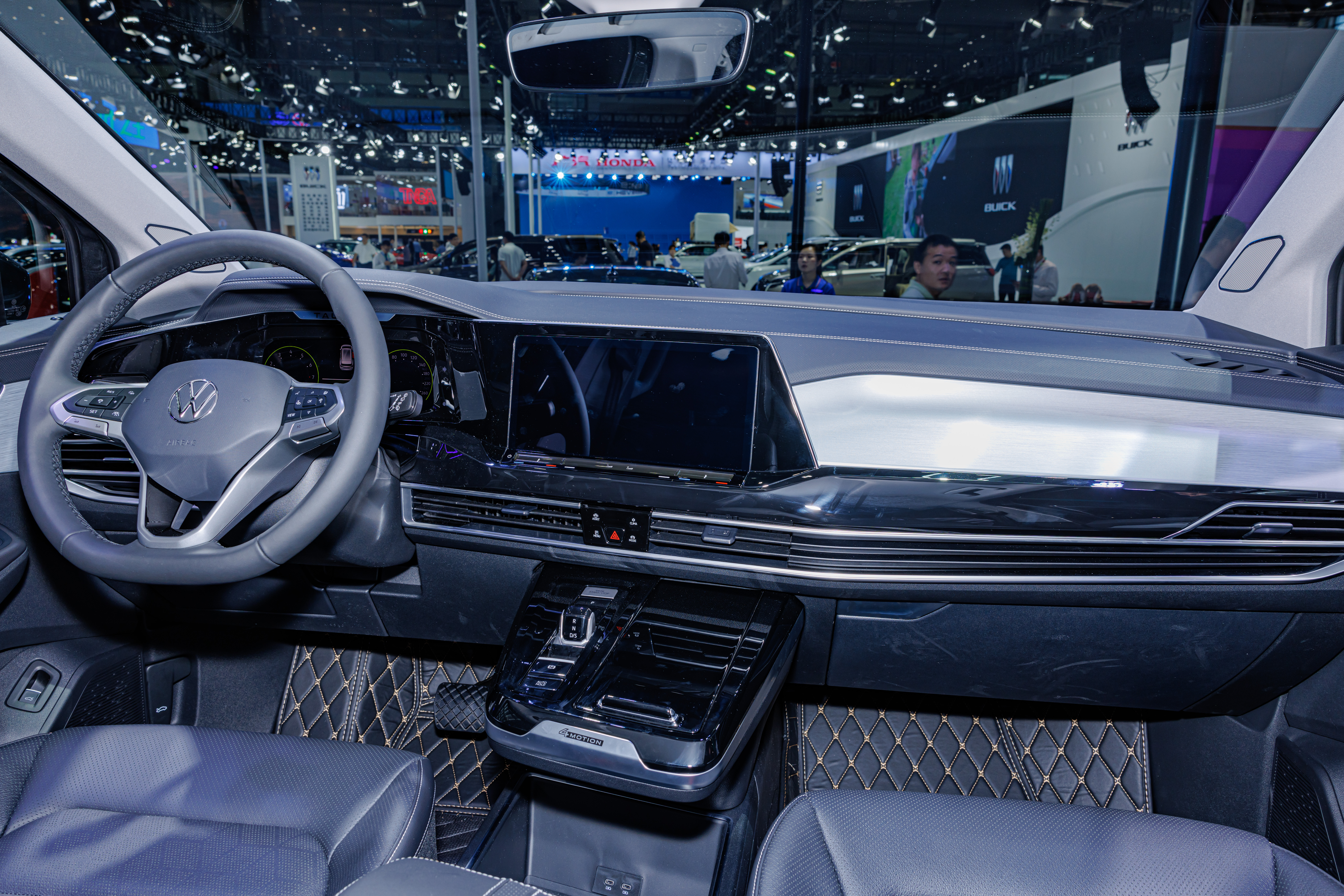
Interior

=== 2025 facelift ===
The facelifted Talagon was first revealed by the Ministry of Industry and Information Technology of China in January 2025, with the facelift model carrying thicker daytime running lights, a larger lower grille, and new tail lights.

The facelift model made its debut at the 2025 Shanghai Auto Show. A new 450 TSI powertrain making 268 horsepower debuted alongside the facelift.

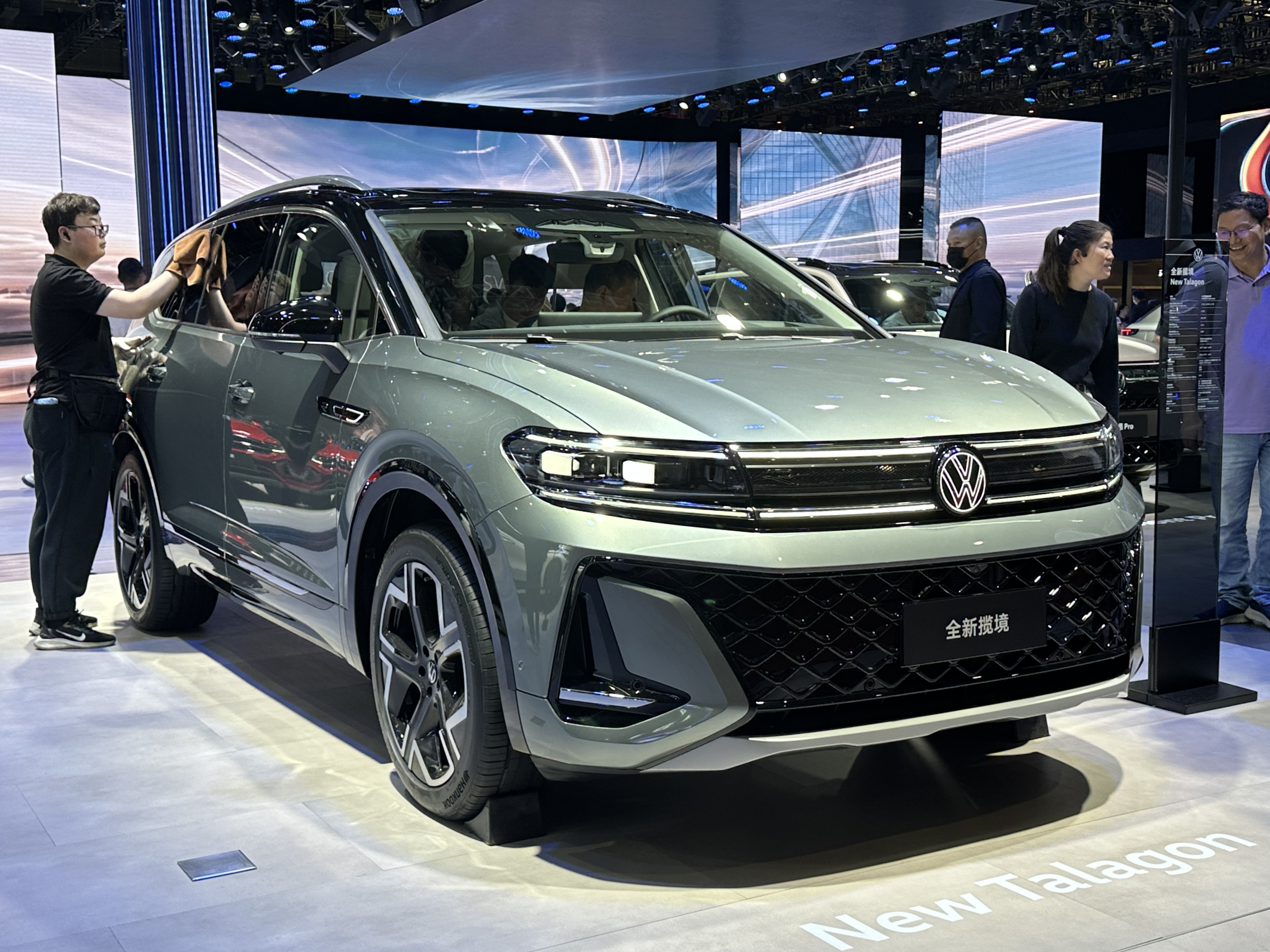
Volkswagen Talagon 2025 facelift

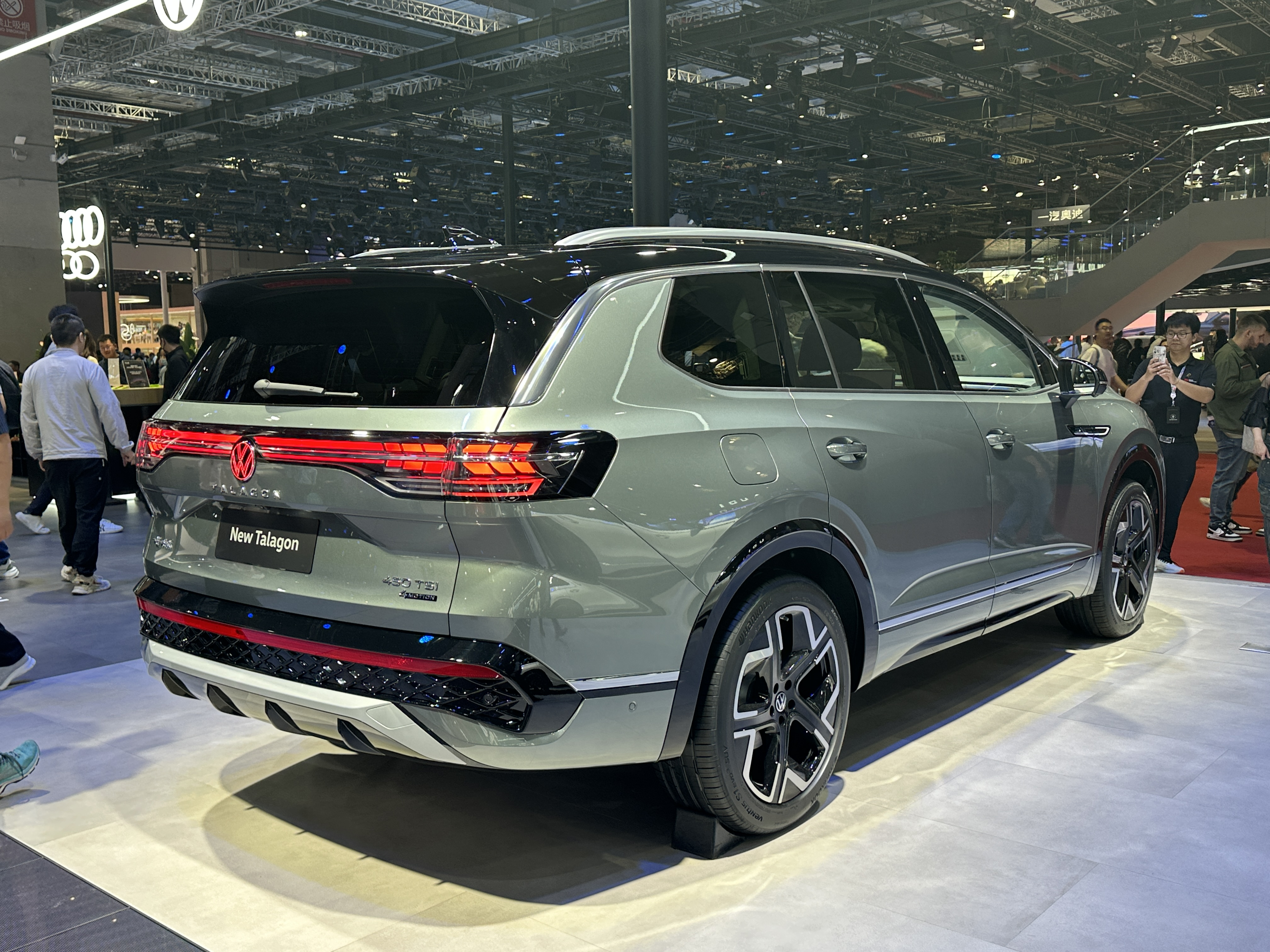
Rear view

=== Powertrain ===
The engine configurations are carried from the Teramont, which include a 2.0-litre turbocharged engine that can produce 186 PS (183 hp; 137 kW) and 220 PS (217 hp; 162 kW), which are labeled '330 TSI' and '380 TSI' respectively. A 2.5-litre VR6 engine labeled as '530 V6' is also offered. All configurations are paired with a wet 7-speed DSG transmission.

Petrol engines
Model	Displacement	Series	Power	Torque	Transmission
2.0 '330 TSI'	1,984 cc (121.1 cu in) I4	EA888 (DPL)	186 PS (183 hp; 137 kW)	320 N⋅m (236 lb⋅ft)	7-speed DSG
2.0 '380 TSI'	1,984 cc (121.1 cu in) I4	EA888 (DKX)	220 PS (217 hp; 162 kW)	350 N⋅m (258 lb⋅ft)	7-speed DSG
2.5 '530 V6'	2,492 cc (152.1 cu in) VR6	EA390 (DPK/DDK)	299 PS (295 hp; 220 kW)	500 N⋅m (369 lb⋅ft)	7-speed DSG

== Sales ==
Year	China
2023	30,939
2024	20,136
2025	11,651
