= Volkswagen Viloran =

Chinese minivan produced by SAIC-VW

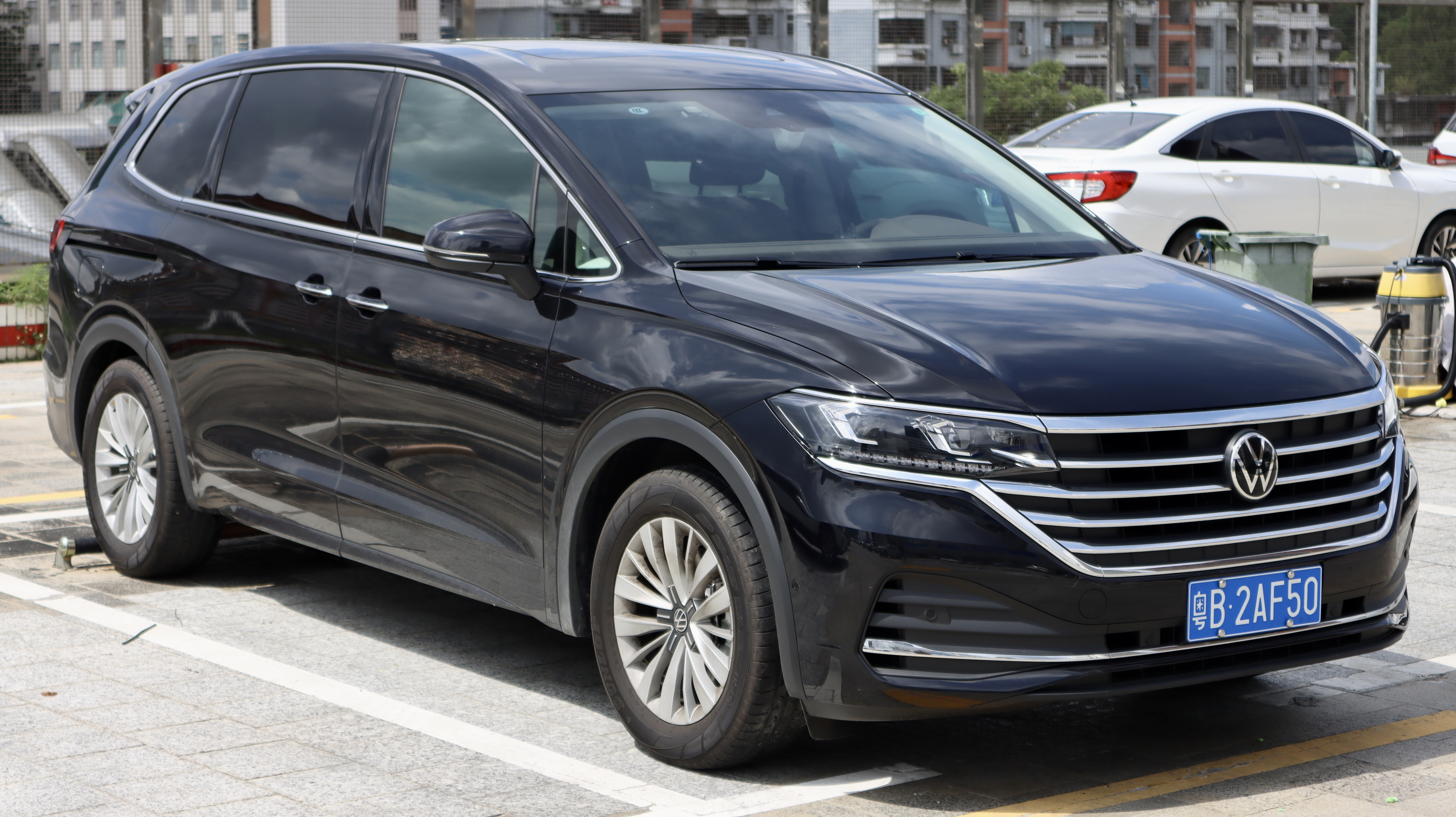

Overview
- Manufacturer: Volkswagen
- Production: 2020–present
- Assembly: China: Ningbo (SAIC-VW)

Body and chassis
- Class: Minivan
- Body style: 5-door minivan
- Layout: Front engine, front-wheel-drive
- Platform: Volkswagen Group MQB A2
- Related: Volkswagen Teramont/Atlas; Volkswagen Talagon; Volkswagen Tavendor

Powertrain
- Engine: Petrol: 2.0 L EA888 I4 turbo
- Power output: 137 kW (183 hp; 186 PS) (2.0L '330 TSI'); 162 kW (217 hp; 220 PS) (2.0L '380 TSI')
- Transmission: 7-speed DSG

Dimensions
- Wheelbase: 3,180 mm (125.2 in)
- Length: 5,346 mm (210.5 in)
- Width: 1,976 mm (77.8 in)
- Height: 1,781 mm (70.1 in)

The Volkswagen Viloran (Chinese: 大众威然; pinyin: Dàzhòng Wēirán) is a minivan produced by SAIC Volkswagen since 2020. It is the largest vehicle built on the MQB platform. As of 2024, it is only sold in China and Vietnam.

== Overview ==
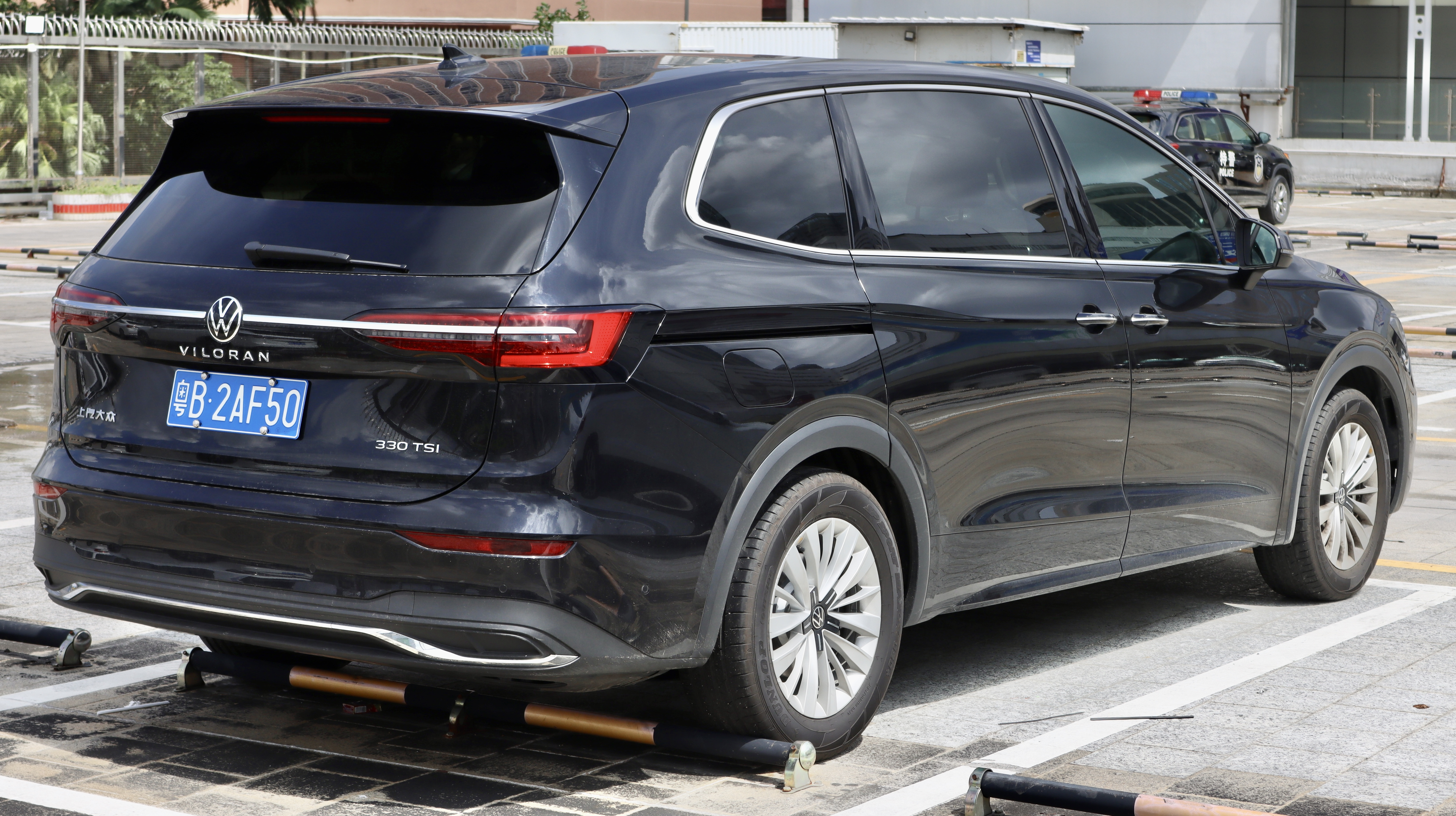
Rear view

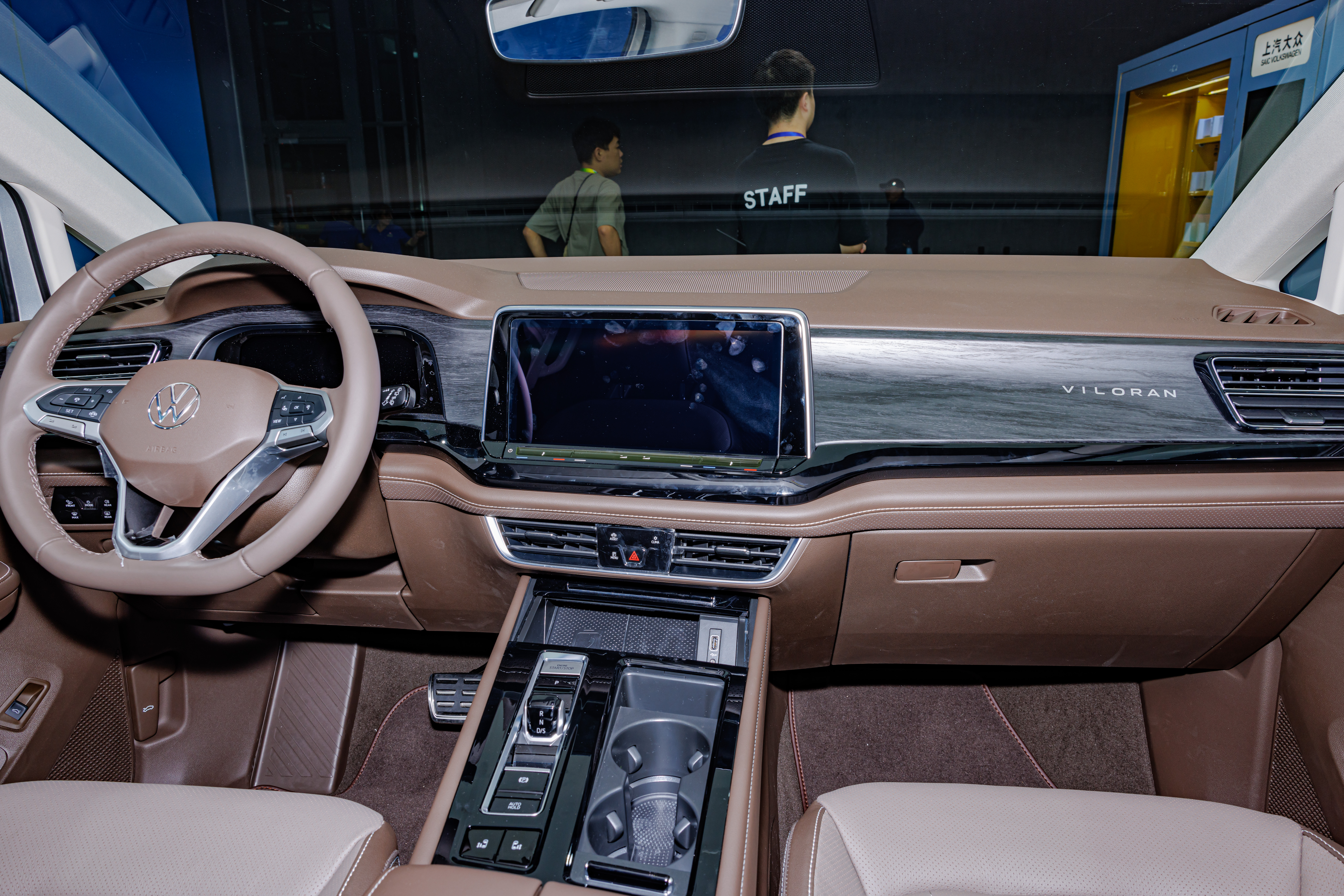
Interior

The Volkswagen Viloran was unveiled at the 2019 Guangzhou Auto Show, and went on sale in China in April 2020.

The Viloran has an 2.0-litre turbocharged inline-4 gasoline engine, offered in 186 hp and 220 hp versions. The Viloran was offered with front-wheel drive and a 7-speed DSG automatic gearbox. The Viloran is currently sold in trim levels known as 330TSI Deluxe, 330TSI Business, 380TSI Premium and 380TSI Ultimate.

In December 2023, the Volkswagen Viloran minivan officially launched in Vietnam, with the model going on sale in early 2024. The Viloran for the Vietnamese auto market will be available in two trim levels which are Premium and Luxury. The Vietnamese-market Volkswagen Viloran will be imported from the SAIC-VW factory in Ningbo, China.

=== Powertrain ===
| Model | Displacement | Series | Power | Torque | Transmission |
Gasoline engines
| 2.0 '330 TSI' | 1,984 cc (121.1 cu in) I4 | EA888 (DPL) | 186 PS (183 hp; 137 kW) | 320 N⋅m (236 lb⋅ft) | 7-speed DSG |
| 2.0 '380 TSI' | 1,984 cc (121.1 cu in) I4 | EA888 (DKX) | 220 PS (217 hp; 162 kW) | 350 N⋅m (258 lb⋅ft) | 7-speed DSG |
