= VR6 engine =

Volkswagen VR6
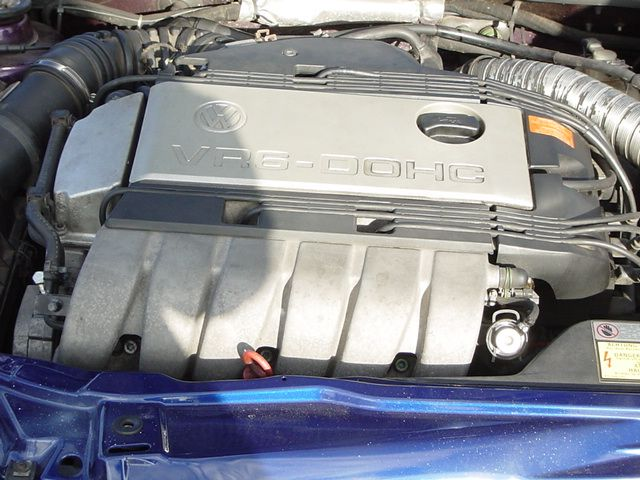
- 1991–1995 Volkswagen Corrado 2.9 litre engine

Overview
- Production: 1991–2024

Layout
- Displacement: 2.5–3.6 L (153–220 cu in)
- Valvetrain: 1991–2002: 12 valves 1999–2024: 24 valves

Combustion
- Fuel type: Petrol

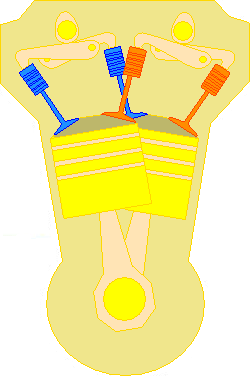
VR Engine Cross section

The VR6 engine is a six-cylinder engine configuration developed by Volkswagen. The name VR6 comes from the combination of German words “Verkürzt” and “Reihenmotor” meaning “shortened” and “inline engine” respectively. It was developed specifically for transverse engine installations and front-wheel drive (FWD) vehicles. The VR6 is a highly compact engine, due to the narrower angle of 10.5 to 15 degrees between adjacent cylinders, as opposed to a V6 engine with angles ranging from 45 to 90 degrees. The compact design is cheaper to manufacture, since only one cylinder head is required for all six cylinders, much like a regular inline-6 engine.

Volkswagen Group introduced the first VR6 engine in 1991 and VR6 engines remained in production until late 2024. Volkswagen also produced a five-cylinder VR5 engine based on the VR6.

== Description ==
VR6 engines share a common cylinder head for the two banks of cylinders. Only two camshafts are needed for the engine, regardless of whether the engine has two or four valves per cylinder. This simplifies engine construction and reduces costs.

Since the cylinders are not located on the centreline of the combined cylinder head, the lengths of the intake and exhaust ports are different for each bank. Without compensation, these varying port lengths would result in the two banks of cylinders producing different amounts of power at a particular engine RPM. The difference in port lengths are compensated for with the length of the runners in the intake manifold, the camshaft overlap and lift profile, or a combination thereof.

differences in port lengths between a V6 and VR6

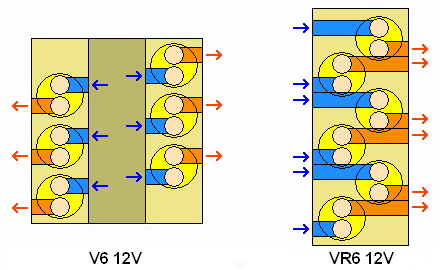
12 Valves

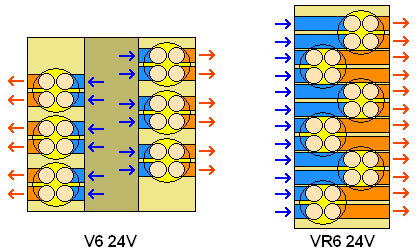
24 Valves

== Volkswagen engines ==
Frontal views: a straight engine
b V engine
c VR engine

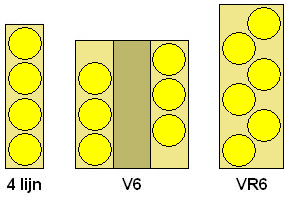
Top views: straight engine (left)
V engine (center)
VR engine (right)

The Volkswagen VR6 engine was designed for transverse engine installations in front-wheel drive vehicles. The narrow angle of 15° between the two cylinder banks reduced the width of the engine, compared to a traditional V6 engine. Therefore, the VR6 engine is easier to fit within an engine bay that was originally designed for a four-cylinder engine.

=== 12-valve versions ===
Early VR6 engines had two valves per cylinder (for a total of twelve valves) and used one camshaft for the intake and exhaust valves of each cylinder bank (without the use of rockers).

The first Volkswagen VR6 engine uses the AAA version. It had a bore of 81.0 mm (3.19 in) and a stroke of 90.3 millimetres (3.56 in), for a total displacement of 2.8 L (171 cu in). In 1994, a 2.9 L (177 cu in) ABV version was introduced in some European countries, with an increased bore of 82.0 mm (3.23 in).

The V angle between the cylinder banks is 15°, and the compression ratio is 10:1. The crankshaft runs in seven main bearings and the journals are offset 22° to one another, in order to accommodate the offset cylinder placement. This also allows the use of a 120° firing interval between cylinders. The firing order is: 1, 5, 3, 6, 2, 4. The centerlines of the cylinders are offset from the centerline of the crankshaft by 12.5 mm (0.49 in).

The valve sizes are 39.0 mm (1.54 in) for the intake and 34.3 mm (1.35 in) for the exhaust. Since the two rows of pistons and cylinders share a single cylinder head and head gasket, the piston crown (or top surface) is tilted. The engine management system is Bosch Motronic.

=== 24-valve versions ===
A version with four valves per cylinder (for a total of 24 valves) was introduced in 1999. The 24-valve versions use one camshaft for the intake valves of both banks (using rockers to reach the furthest bank) and the other camshaft for the exhaust valves of both banks (again, through the use of rockers). This operating principle is more akin to a double overhead camshaft (DOHC) design, with one camshaft for intake valves, and one for exhaust valves.

=== History ===
The 1922–1976 Lancia V4 engine and 1922–1939 Lancia V8 engine were the first narrow angle V engines to be used in a motor vehicle.

The first versions of the VR6 engine were introduced in the 1991 Volkswagen Passat B3 sedan and Volkswagen Corrado coupe. A 2.8 L (171 cu in) AAA version producing 128 kW (172 hp) was used in most Passat models and in the North American version of the Corrado. A 2.9 L (177 cu in) ABV version producing 140 kW (188 hp) was used in the Passat Syncro model and the European version of the Corrado. Both versions used two valves per cylinder. Usage of the VR6 engine spread to the Volkswagen Golf Mk3 2.8 VR6 and Volkswagen Vento/Jetta (A3), 2.8 VR6 models in 1992, and high specification versions of the Sharan/Galaxy/Alhambra MPVs. The 2.8 litre version was also used in the 1996–2003 Mercedes-Benz Vito (W638) commercial vans, where it was designated M104.900.

In 1997, the VR5 engine was introduced, based on the VR6 engine.

An AQP/AUE version with four valves per cylinder was introduced in 2000. This 2.8 L (171 cu in) engine produced 150 kW (201 hp), and mostly replaced the two-valve engines, except for in North America where an updated version of the two-valve engine was used in the Golf and Jetta from 2000 to 2002. From 2003 to 2005 the 2.8 L four valves per cylinder engine was used in specific Golf and Jetta models.

A 3.2 L (195 cu in) EA390 version of the 4 valve engine was introduced in the 2001 Volkswagen New Beetle RSi model. Versions of this 3.2 litre engine were also used in the 2002–2004 Volkswagen Golf Mk4 R32 model, the 2003-2010 Audi TT 3.2 VR6 quattro models and the 2003-2009 Audi A3 8P 3.2 VR6 Quattro(US Models). Peak power output was 165 kW (221 hp) in the New Beetle (engine code AXJ), 177 kW (237 hp) in the New Beetle and Golf (engine code BFH/BJS), and 184 kW (247 hp) in the Audi TT(engine code BHE) and Audi A3 8P(engine code BDB / BMJ / BUB).

The engine size was again increased in 2005, when a 3.6 L (220 cu in) version with gasoline direct injection (FSI) was introduced in the Volkswagen Passat (B6). This BLV version uses a narrower 10.6 degree angle between the cylinder banks and produces 206 kW (276 hp). A 3.2 L (195 cu in) AXZ version producing 184 kW (247 hp) was introduced in 2006. In 2008, an uprated BWS version of the 3.6 litre engine producing 220 kW (295 hp) was introduced in the Volkswagen Passat (B6) R36 model.

The base model Porsche Cayenne (9PA) used the 3.2-liter VR6 engine from 2003 to 2006 and then a 3.6-litre VR6 engine from 2008 to 2010. Then the next generation Porsche Cayenne (92A) also used a 3.6-litre VR6 engine from 2010 to 2018.

Volkswagen had started to phase out VR engines in favour of downsized turbocharged four cylinder engines. The VR6 was discontinued from the Volkswagen Passat NMS by 2019 leaving the Volkswagen Atlas as the only model with this engine at the time. The VR6 was eventually discontinued from most markets when the Volkswagen Atlas dropped the engine as an option since 2023.

Volkswagen never entirely abandoned the platform and designed a new VR6 (still EA390) for the Chinese market only, a 2.5-litre turbocharged 24-valve VR6 producing 220 kW (295 hp) and 500 N⋅m of torque, for the Volkswagen Teramont SUV and Volkswagen Talagon MPV. The engine has been available since the Teramont debuted in 2017 and were built in Germany and shipped to China and comply with their unique tax and emissions regulations.

== Enthusiast culture ==
The VR6 has developed a cult following within automotive and tuning communities, largely attributed to its distinctive, throaty exhaust note and compact design making it a common choice for engine swaps in the Volkswagen tuner scene. The engine's acoustic profile led enthusiasts to nickname it after the fictional Star Wars character Chewbacca and also inspired the name for an annual gathering of VR6 powered cars called "Wookies in the Woods.

== Applications ==
Volkswagen Group automobiles:

- 1991–1995 Volkswagen Corrado
- 1991–2015 Volkswagen Passat (B3), Volkswagen Passat (B4), Volkswagen Passat (B6) and Volkswagen Passat (B7) generations
- 1992–1998 Volkswagen Golf Mk3
- 1992–1999 Volkswagen Vento/Volkswagen Jetta Mk3
- 1995–2000 Volkswagen Sharan
- 1996–2003 Volkswagen Transporter (T4)
- 1996–2010 SEAT Alhambra (7M)
- 1998–2003 Volkswagen Golf Mk4
- 1999–2005 Volkswagen Bora/Volkswagen Jetta Mk4
- 2000–2004 SEAT León (1M)
- 2001–2003 Volkswagen New Beetle RSi
- 2002–2016 Volkswagen Phaeton
- 2002–2018 Volkswagen Touareg
- 2002–2018 Porsche Cayenne E1 and E2 generations
- 2003–2009 Volkswagen Transporter (T5)
- 2003–2013 Audi A3 (8P)
- 2003–2010 Audi TT Mk1 and Mk2
- 2005–2008 Volkswagen Golf Mk5 R32
- 2006–2011 Volkswagen Eos
- 2008–2017 Volkswagen CC
- 2008–2014 Škoda Superb (3T)
- 2008–2015 Audi Q7 (4L)
- 2011–2018 Volkswagen Passat NMS
- 2017–2024 Volkswagen Atlas
- 2017–2024 Volkswagen Teramont
- 2021–2024 Volkswagen Talagon
- 2022–2024 Audi Q6

Other manufacturers:

- 1995–2000 Ford Galaxy Mk I
- 1996–2003 Mercedes-Benz Vito (W638)
- 1997–2005 Winnebago Rialta/Vista/Itasca Sunstar
- 2006– Yes! 2
- 2009–2012 Artega GT
- Linde Forklifts (fuelled by liquefied petroleum gas)

=== W engines ===
Volkswagen Group has produced several W engines based on combining two VR engines on a common crankshaft. The first W engine to reach production was the W12 engine which has been produced since 2001. The W12 engine can be thought of as two VR6 engines an angle of 72 degrees. Although Volkswagen has not produced a VR4 engine, it produced a W8 engine from 2001 to 2004, which can be thought of as two VR4 engines on a common crankshaft.

The largest Volkswagen W engine is the W16 engine introduced on the Bugatti Veyron in 2005. This engine can be thought of as two VR8 engines at an angle of 90 degrees. It additionally has four turbochargers.

== Other manufacturers ==
Motorcycle manufacturer Horex has produced VR6 engines since 2012.
