= Direct-shift gearbox =

Type of dual-clutch transmission

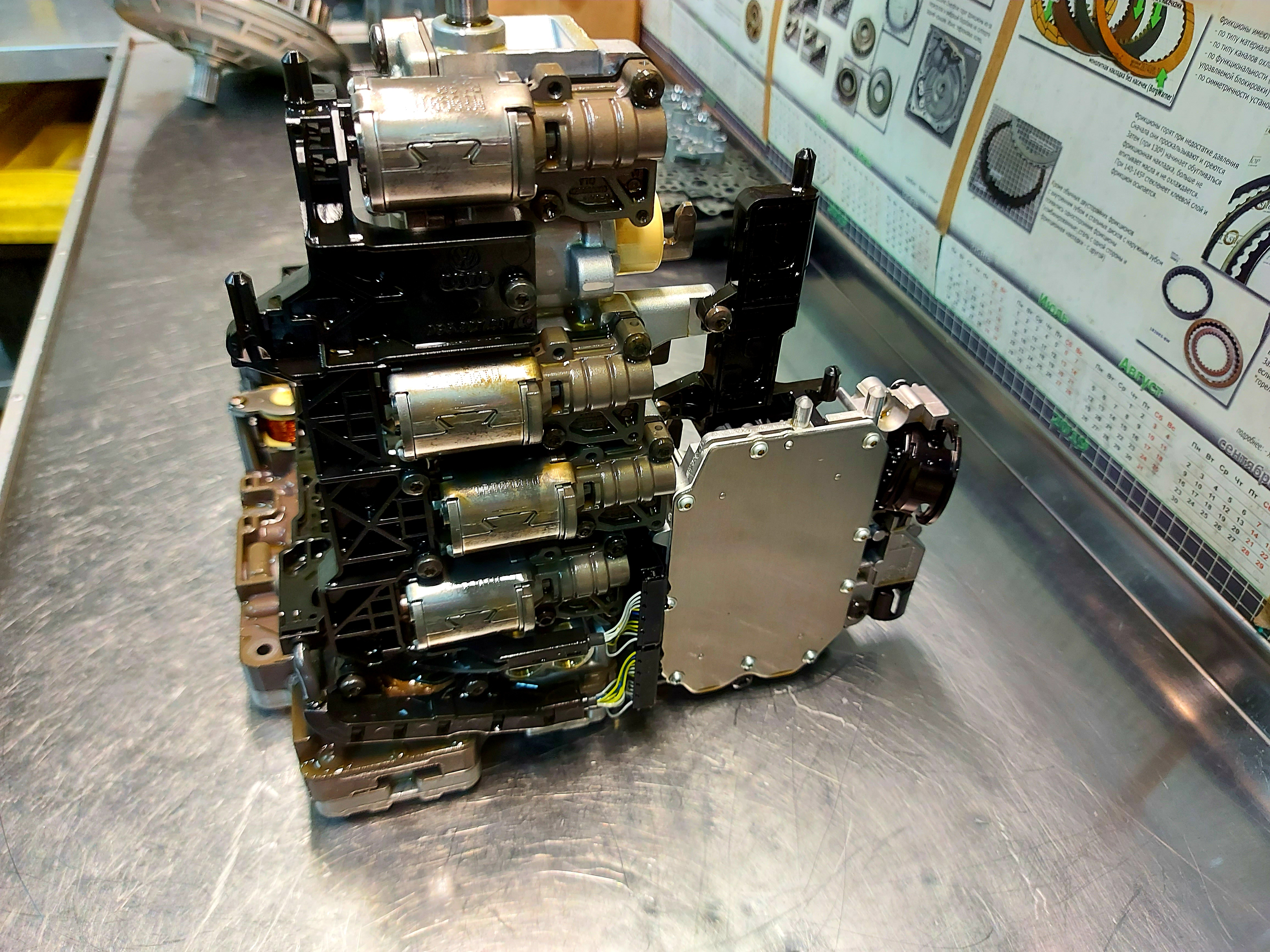
DSG DL 501

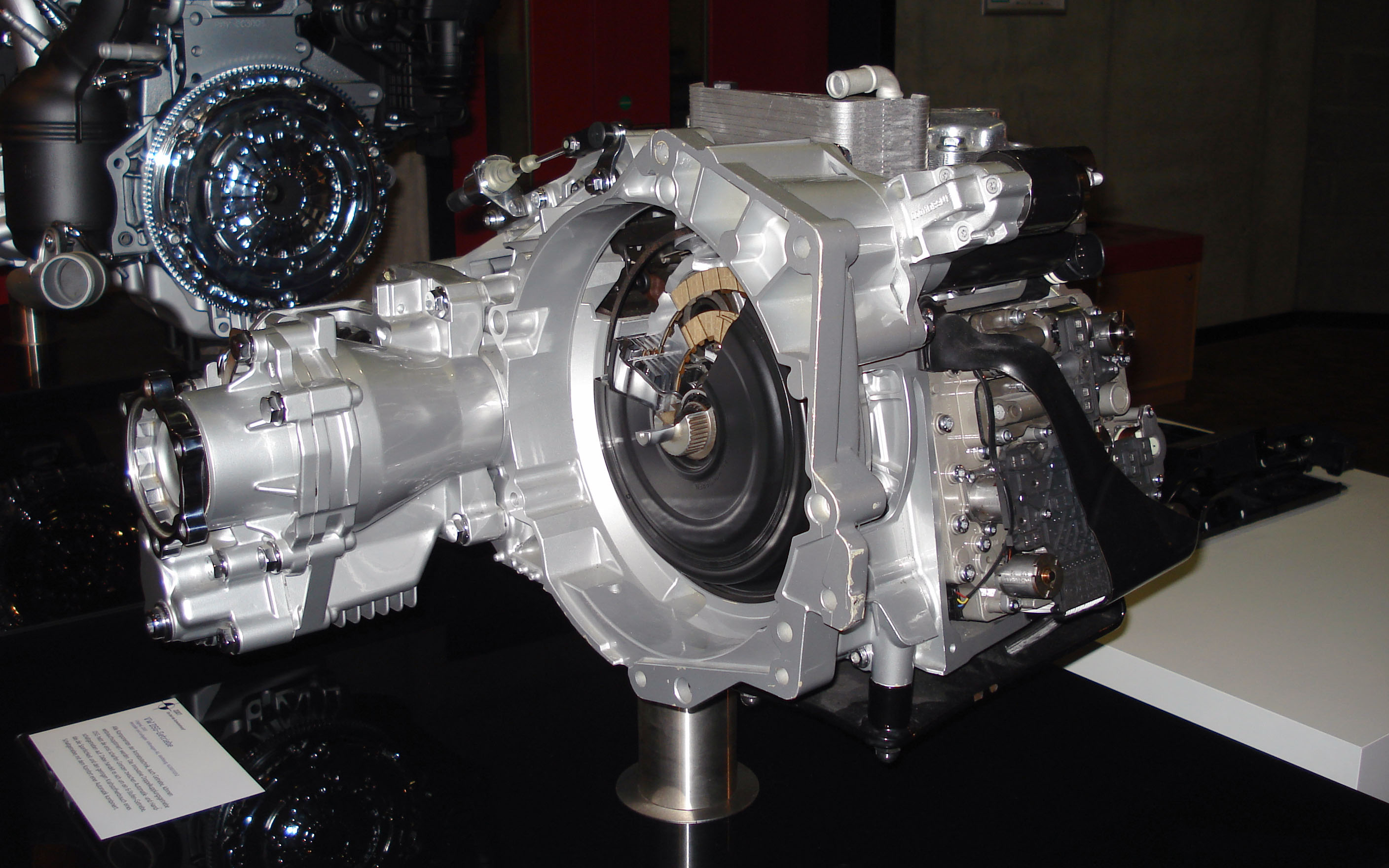
Part-cutaway view of the Volkswagen Group 6-speed direct-shift gearbox. The concentric multi-plate clutches have been sectioned, along with the mechatronics module. This also shows the additional power take-off for distributing torque to the rear axle for four-wheel drive applications. (View this image with annotations)

Schematic diagram of a dual-clutch gearbox: M: Motor; A: Primary drive and driving shaft; B: Dual clutch; C: Driven shaft; D: Layshaft, hollow, even gears; E: Layshaft, odd gears; F: Output

A direct-shift gearbox (DSG, German: Direktschaltgetriebe) is the Volkswagen Group's term for an electronically controlled, dual-clutch, multiple-shaft, automatic gearbox, in either a transaxle or traditional transmission layout (depending on engine/drive configuration), with automated clutch operation, and with fully-automatic or semi-manual gear selection. The first dual-clutch transmissions were derived from Porsche in-house development for the Porsche 962 in the 1980s.

In simple terms, a DSG automates two separate "manual" gearboxes (and clutches) contained within one housing and working as one unit. It was designed by BorgWarner and is licensed to the Volkswagen Group, with support by IAV GmbH. By using two independent clutches, a DSG can achieve faster shift times and eliminates the torque converter of a conventional epicyclic automatic transmission.

== Overview ==
=== Transverse DSG ===
At the time of launch in 2003, it became the world's first automated dual-clutch transmission in a series-production car in the German-market Volkswagen Golf Mk4 R32, and shortly afterwards, worldwide, in the original Audi TT 3.2 and the 2004+ New Beetle TDI. For the first few years of production, this original DSG transmission was only available in transversely oriented front-engine, front-wheel-drive and Haldex Traction-based four-wheel-drive vehicle layouts. All transverse DSG have an internal code starting with DQ (German: DSG quer, English: DSG transverse) and are coupled to the engine via a dual-mass flywheel.

DQ250

The first DSG transaxle that went into production for the Volkswagen Group mainstream marques had six forward speeds (and one reverse) and used wet/submerged multi-plate clutch packs (Volkswagen Group internal code: DQ250, parts code prefix: 02E, 0D9). It has been paired to engines with up to 350 N⋅m (260 lb⋅ft) of torque. The two-wheel-drive version weighs 93 kg (205 lb). It is manufactured at Volkswagen Group's Kassel plant, with a daily production output of 1,500 units.

DQ200

At the start of 2008, another world-first 70 kg (150 lb) seven-speed DSG transaxle (Volkswagen Group internal code: DQ200, parts code prefix: 0AM, 0CW) became available. It differs from the six-speed DSG, in that it uses two single-plate dry clutches (of similar diameter). This clutch pack was designed by LuK Clutch Systems, Gmbh. This seven-speed DSG is used in smaller front-wheel-drive cars with smaller-displacement engines with lower torque outputs, such as the Volkswagen Golf Mk6, Volkswagen Polo Mk5, the SEAT Ibiza, and the Škoda Yeti, especially in combination with the 1.2 TSI/TFSI (EA111) engine. It has been paired to engines with up to 250 N⋅m (180 lb⋅ft). This new DQ200 uses just 1 litre of specialised DSG fluid for the hydraulics and 1.7 litres of gearbox oil. In contrast, the DSG gearboxes with wet clutches use 7 litres (5.5 litres for a service) for both hydraulics and gearbox lubrication.

DQ200e

The DQ200e (0CG, FWD, 73 kg) is a variation of the DQ200 transmission that first appeared in 2008 in the Golf V TwinDrive prototype. It is based on the standard DQ200, but modified to accommodate components of a hybrid system. The clutch housing was extended by 83 mm to allow space for an additional disengagement clutch, its hydraulics, and a hybrid module. This module was mounted between the crankshaft and the dual-mass flywheel, functioning as a motor-generator unit and starter.

The Golf V TwinDrive combined a pre-production version of the DQ200e with a 20–30 hp electric motor and a 2.0 PD TDI engine. This plug-in hybrid featured a 12 kWh lithium-ion battery for about 30-50 km of electric range. About twenty prototypes were produced and publicly tested in Lower Saxony, Germany. The diesel–hybrid pairing proved unsuccessful: the system was overly complex, cold-running diesels in start/stop traffic created emission issues, and reliability was poor. After two years the programme was halted in favour of a petrol-hybrid approach. The project was partially funded by the German Federal Ministry for the Environment under its Förderprogramm Elektromobilität.

In 2010 Volkswagen trialled the plug-in Golf VI TwinDrive prototype, pairing the DQ200e hybrid transmission with a 1.4 TSI petrol engine. As with the Golf V, it featured a 12 kWh lithium-ion battery for about 30-50 km of electric range. Around 20–30 cars were tested, leading to the production version introduced in the Volkswagen Jetta VI Hybrid.

The Jetta VI Hybrid appeared in 2013, using the EA211 1.4 TSI engine rated at 110 kW (150 PS), combined with a 20 kW (27 PS) electric motor and a 1.1 kWh lithium-ion battery providing about 1–2 km of electric range. In contrast to the earlier TwinDrive models, it was not a plug-in hybrid. Sales remained limited, with total production estimated between 20,000 and 40,000 units worldwide, mainly in North America and China. Although conceptually close to the later Golf GTE, the use of the dry-clutch DQ200e limited durability, and the project was eventually superseded by the more powerful wet-clutch DQ400e system introduced in 2014.

DQ500

In September 2009, VW launched a new seven-speed DSG built to support up to 600 N⋅m (440 lb⋅ft), the DQ500 (parts code prefix 0BH, 0BT). Like the DQ250, it features a wet multi-plate clutch pack. This gearbox premiered in the Transporter T5 2.0 TDI. It later became available in the Tiguan 2.0 TDI 4Motion, the BiTDI models of the VW Passat, VW Tiguan and Skoda Superb. It premiered in petrol-powered cars in the 2010 Audi TTRS 8J as a 7-speed S-Tronic gearbox. It later appeared in other top sports editions cars like the Arteon R and Tiguan R, coupled to a Magna torque-splitting rear differential to facilitate an all-wheel drive system. The two-wheel drive version weighs 96 kg (212 lb); the four-wheel drive version is 3 kg (6.6 lb) heavier.

DQ400e

Taking the concept of the DQ200e, the DQ250 was further developed into the DQ400e (prefix 0DD, FWD only, 128kg) for the plug-in hybrid models of the VW Group. It debuted in July 2014 in the Golf mk7 GTE. It is combined with the 1.4 and later with 1.5 TSI engines. It is broadly used in the plug-in hybrids like the Golf GTE and Passat GTE, the Arteon, Tiguan and Transporter T7 e-Hybrid and the equivalent versions of the Audi A3 and Audi Q3, Seat Leon and Skoda Octavia and Superb iV. The electric motor is included in the DSG assembly, between the combustion engine and the gearbox. Unlike the DQ200e, the flywheel is mounted to the engine. There are a total of three clutches on this DSG: two connecting the engine to the gearbox (K1, K2) and a disengagement clutch (K0) to connecting the electric drive to the engine.

As per VW Self Study Programme 538: The disengagement clutch K0 is engaged:

- When the electric drive motor V141 starts the combustion engine.
- When the vehicle is being driven by the combustion engine.
- When both power units drive the vehicle.

The disengagement clutch K0 is disengaged when the vehicle is driven exclusively by the electric drive motor.

DQ380 and DQ381

The seven-speed DQ380 (prefix 0DE) appeared in 2015 for the Chinese market, i.e. in the VW Golf and VW Magotan. It is based on the DQ500, sharing many of its mechanical and electrical components like the mechatronic. It is lighter (85kg) and smaller, can handle torque up to 420Nm and is only available in front-wheel drive configuration. The DQ380 was produced in China. The addition of the seventh gear adds a 3gr/km of CO_{2} reduction compared to the DQ250.

The DQ380 was further developed into the DQ381 (prefix 0GC), to meet the requirements of the European market. It was introduced in 2017 and replaces the outgoing DQ250 worldwide. It saves 5 to 10 gr/km of CO_{2} compared to the 0DE due to taller gearing, low friction bearings and seals and a new concept of its hydraulics. In contrary to the DQ380, which is front-wheel drive only, the DQ381 comes in both a front-wheel drive version DQ381-7F version and a DQ381-7A version, combined with a Haldex rear differential, to provide all-wheel drive. The only exception to this are cars with the electronic VAQ (Vorder Achse Quersperre) differential; these front-wheel drive cars employ an all-wheel drive gearbox casing and differential to facilitate the VAQ system.

=== Audi longitudinal DSG ===
In late 2008, an all-new seven-speed longitudinal S tronic version of the DSG transaxle went into series production (Volkswagen Group internal code: DL501, parts code prefix: 0B5). Initially, from early 2009, it is only used in certain Audi cars, and only with longitudinally mounted engines. Like the original six-speed DSG, it features a concentric dual wet multi-plate clutch. However, this particular variant uses notably more plates – the larger outer clutch (for the odd-numbered gears) uses 10 plates, whereas the smaller inner clutch (driving even-numbered gears and reverse) uses 12 plates. Another notable change over the original transverse DSGs is the lubrication system – Audi now utilise two totally separate oil circuits. One oil circuit, consisting of 7.5 litres (1.65 imp gal; 1.98 US gal), lubricates the hydraulic clutches and mechatronics with fully synthetic specialist automatic transmission fluid (ATF), whilst the other oil circuit lubricates the gear trains and front and centre differentials with 4.3 litres (0.95 imp gal; 1.14 US gal) of conventional hypoid gear oil. This dual circuit lubrication is aimed at increasing overall reliability, due to eliminating cross-contamination of debris and wear particles. It has a torque handling limit of up to 600 N⋅m (440 lb⋅ft), and engine power outputs of up to 330 kW (450 PS; 440 bhp). It has a total mass, including all lubricants and the dual-mass flywheel of 141.5 kg (312 lb).

This was initially available in their quattro all-wheel-drive variants, and is very similar to the new ZF Friedrichshafen-supplied Porsche Doppel-Kupplung (PDK).

== List of DSG variants ==
Name	Orientation	Ratios	Max. torque (N·m)	Clutch type	Comments
DQ200	Transverse	7	250	Dry	7-speed DSG transmission (0AM/0CW) with dry clutches, mostly found on VAG-cars from 2007 till present day. With engine capacity between 1.0–1.6-litres. This DSG transmission is only available in front-wheel drive configurations.
DQ200e	Transverse	7	400	Dry	7-speed DSG transmission (0CG) with dry clutches, found on the earlier hybrids like the Volkswagen Jetta 1.4 TSI Hybrid. This DSG transmission is only available in front-wheel drive configurations.
DQ250	Transverse	6	400	Wet	6-speed DSG transmission (02E/0D9) with wet clutches, most found on VAG-cars from 2003 till 2020. It was phased out in favour of the more fuel-efficient and lighter DQ381. The DQ250 comes in a 6F variant for FWD and a -6A variant for AWD.
DQ380	Transverse	7	420	Wet	7-speed DSG transmission with wet clutches (0DE), developed for the Chinese market Production started in 2015. This transmission is a lighter and smaller version of the DQ500, but slightly stronger than the DQ250. This DSG transmission is only available in front-wheel drive configurations.
DQ381	Transverse	7	420-430	Wet	7-speed DSG transmission with wet clutches (0GC), introduced in 2017 as the successor of the DQ380, for the European market. From 2017 onwards it replaced the outgoing DQ250 gearboxes worldwide. The DQ381 comes in a -7F variant for FWD and a -7A variant for AWD.
DQ400e	Transverse	6	400	Wet	6-speed DSG transmission with wet clutches (0DD), based on the DQ250. This DSG transmission is only available in front-wheel drive configurations.
DQ500	Transverse	7	600	Wet	7-speed DSG transmission with wet clutches (0BT, 0BH), first introduced in the Transporter MY 2010 as a stronger DSG gearbox alongside the DQ250. The DQ500 comes in a -7F variant for FWD and a -7A variant for AWD.
DQ511	Transverse	10	550	Wet	The DQ511 was a planned 10-speed DSG transmission. The project was cancelled citing cost and complexity issues.
DL382	Longitudinal	7	500	Wet	7-speed DSG transmission with wet clutch. Used in the Audi A4/A5/A6/Q5 and Volkswagen Phideon. Production started in 2015 with a 400Nm capacity, both front wheel drive variant DL382-7F and all wheel drive variant DL382-7Q are provided. The Quattro Ultra all wheel drive version DL382-7A is introduced with Q5(typ FY). Starting with Audi A6/A7(typ 4K), the high torque variant(up to 500Nm) named as DL382+ is introduced. 0CK and 0DN are codenames for DL382-7F, 0CL is for DL382-7Q, 0CJ and 0DP are for DL382-7A and 0HL is for DL382+-7A.
DL501	Longitudinal	7	600	Wet	7-speed DSG transmission with wet clutch. (Audi S-tronic)
DL800	Longitudinal	7		Wet	7-speed DSG transmission with wet clutch. Rarely used, only in the second generation Audi R8 (2015–present) and the Lamborghini Huracan. Manufactured by Graziano.

== Operational introduction ==
The internal combustion engine drives two clutch packs. The outer clutch pack drives gears 1, 3, 5 (and 7 when fitted), and reverse – the outer clutch pack has a larger diameter compared to the inner clutch, and can therefore handle greater torque loadings. The inner clutch pack drives gears 2, 4, and 6. Instead of a standard large dry single-plate clutch, each clutch pack for the six-speed DSG is a collection of four small wet interleaved clutch plates (similar to a motorcycle wet multi-plate clutch). Due to space constraints, the two clutch assemblies are concentric, and the shafts within the gearbox are hollow and also concentric. Because the alternate clutch pack's gear-sets can be pre-selected (predictive shifts enabled via the unloaded section of the gearbox), un-powered time while shifting is avoided because the transmission of torque is simply switched from one clutch-pack to the other. While the DSG has one of the fastest shift times on the market, the claim that the DSG takes only about 8 milliseconds to upshift is un-proven with 3-party data nor claimed by the manufacturer.

The variant of DSG fitted to plug-in hybrid vehicles (such as the Golf/Passat GTE and the Audi A3 e-tron) also have a third clutch - its function is connect the electric motor to the combustion engine when both power sources are required simultaneously to propel the vehicle (the motor armature permanently turns with the input shaft of the transmission) - it also is engaged to bump start the combustion engine from the electric motor whenever the transmission is in the "N" position - this is due to the engine not having a conventional starter motor.

=== DSG controls ===
The direct-shift gearbox uses a floor-mounted transmission shift lever, very similar to that of a conventional automatic transmission. The lever is operated in a straight 'fore and aft' plane (without any 'dog-leg' offset movements), and uses an additional button to help prevent an inadvertent selection of an inappropriate shift lever position.

==== P ====
P position of the floor-mounted gear shift lever means that the transmission is set in park. Both clutch packs are fully disengaged, all gear-sets are disengaged, and a solid mechanical transmission lock is applied to the crown wheel of the DSG's internal differential. This position must only be used when the motor vehicle is stationary. Furthermore, this is the position which must be set on the shift lever before the vehicle ignition key can be removed.

==== N ====
N position of the floor-mounted shift lever means that the transmission is in neutral. Similar to P above, both clutch packs and all gear-sets are fully disengaged; however, the parking lock is also disengaged.

==== D mode ====
Whilst the motor vehicle is stationary and in neutral (N), the driver can select D for drive (after first pressing the foot brake pedal). The transmission's outer clutch K2 engages at the start of the bite point, while on the alternate gear shaft the reverse gear clutch K1 is also selected. The clutch pack for second gear (K2) gets ready to engage. When the driver releases the brake pedal, the K2 clutch clamping force is increased, allowing the transmission to drive the wheels. Depressing the accelerator pedal engages the clutch and causes an increase of forward vehicle speed. Pressing the throttle pedal to the floor (hard acceleration) will cause the gearbox to "kick down" to first gear to provide the acceleration associated with first, although there will be a slight hesitation while the gearbox deselects second gear and selects first gear. As the vehicle accelerates, the transmission's computer determines when the second gear (which is connected to the second clutch) should be fully used. Depending on the vehicle speed and amount of engine power being requested by the driver (determined by the position of the throttle pedal), the DSG then up-shifts. During this sequence, the DSG disengages the first outer clutch whilst simultaneously engaging the second inner clutch (all power from the engine is now going through the second shaft), thus completing the shift sequence. This sequence in a fraction of a second (aided by pre-selection), and can be performed without lifting off the throttle, resulting in minimal power loss.

Once the vehicle has completed the shift to second gear, the first gear is immediately de-selected, and third gear is pre-selected. Once the time comes to shift into 3rd, the second clutch disengages and the first clutch re-engages. This sequence repeats through the gear changes.

Downshifting is similar to up-shifting but in reverse order. At 600 milliseconds downshifting is necessarily slower, due to the engine's Electronic Control Unit (ECU) needing to 'blip' the throttle so that the engine crankshaft speed can match the appropriate gear shaft speed. A downshift occurs when the ECU senses the car slowing down, or when more power is required.

The actual shift points are determined by the DSG's transmission ECU, which controls a hydro-mechanical unit. The transmission ECU, combined with the hydro-mechanical unit, are collectively called a mechatronics unit or module. Because the DSG's ECU uses fuzzy logic, the operation of the DSG is said to be adaptive; that is, the DSG will "learn" how the user drives the car, and will progressively tailor the shift points accordingly to suit the habits of the driver.

In the vehicle instrument display, between the speedometer and tachometer, the available shift-lever positions are shown, the current position of the shift-lever is highlighted (emboldened), and the current gear ratio in use is also displayed as a number.

Under "normal", progressive and linear acceleration and deceleration, the DSG shifts in a sequential manner; i.e., under acceleration: 1st → 2nd → 3rd → 4th → 5th → 6th, and the same sequence reversed for deceleration. However, the DSG can also skip the normal sequential method, by missing gears, and shift two or more gears. This is most apparent if the car is being driven at sedate speeds in one of the higher gears with a light throttle opening, and the accelerator pedal is then pressed down, engaging the kick-down function. During kick-down, the DSG will skip gears, shifting directly to the most appropriate gear depending on speed and throttle opening. This kick-down may be engaged by any increased accelerator pedal opening, and is completely independent of the additional resistance to be found when the pedal is pressed fully to the floor, which will activate a similar kick-down function when in Manual operation mode. The seven-speed unit in the 2007 Audi variants will not automatically shift to 6th gear; rather, it stays at 5th to keep power available at a high RPM while cruising.

When the floor-mounted gear selector lever is in position D, the DSG works in fully automatic mode, with emphasis placed on gear shifts programmed to deliver maximum fuel economy. That means that shifts will change up and down very early in the rev-range. As an example, on the Volkswagen Golf Mk5 GTI, sixth gear will be engaged around 52 km/h (32 mph), when initially using the DSG transmission with the default ECU adaptation; although with an "aggressive" or "sporty" driving style, the adaptive shift pattern will increase the vehicle speed at which sixth gear engages.

==== S mode ====
The floor selector lever also has an S position. When S is selected, sport mode is activated in the DSG. Sport mode still functions as a fully automatic mode, identical in operation to D mode, but upshifts and downshifts are made much higher up the engine rev-range. This aids a more sporty driving manner, by utilising considerably more of the available engine power, and also maximising engine braking. However, this mode does have a detrimental effect on the vehicle fuel consumption, when compared to D mode. This mode may not be ideal to use when wanting to drive in a sedate manner; nor when road conditions are very slippery, due to ice, snow or torrential rain – because loss of tire traction may be experienced (wheel spin during acceleration, and may also result in road wheel locking during downshifts at high engine rpms under closed throttle). On 4motion or quattro-equipped vehicles this may be partially offset by the drivetrain maintaining full-time engagement of the rear differential in S mode, so power distribution under loss of front-wheel traction may be marginally improved.

S is highlighted in the instrument display, and like D mode, the currently used gear ratio is also displayed as a number.

==== R ====
R position of the floor-mounted shift lever means that the transmission is in reverse. This functions in a similar way to D, but there is just one reverse gear. When selected, R is highlighted in the instrument display.

==== Manual mode ====
Additionally, the floor shift lever also has another plane of operation, for manual mode, with spring-loaded + and − positions. This plane is selected by moving the stick away from the driver (in vehicles with the driver's seat on the right, the lever is pushed to the left, and in left-hand drive cars, the stick is pushed to the right) when in D mode only. When this plane is selected, the DSG can now be controlled like a manual gearbox, albeit only under a sequential shift pattern.

In most (VW) applications, the readout in the instrument display changes to 6 5 4 3 2 1, and just like the automatic modes, the currently used gear ratio is highlighted or emboldened. In other versions (e.g., on the Audi TT) the display shows just M followed by the gear currently selected; e.g., M1, M2, etc.

To change up a gear, the lever is pushed forward (against a spring pressure) towards the +, and to change down, the lever is pulled rearward towards the −. The DSG transmission can now be operated with the gear changes being (primarily) determined by the driver. This method of operation is commonly called tiptronic. In the interests of engine preservation, when accelerating in Manual/tiptronic mode, the DSG will still automatically change up just before the redline, and when decelerating, it will change down automatically at very low revs, just before the engine idle speed (tick-over). Furthermore, if the driver calls for a gear when it is not appropriate (e.g., requesting a downshift when engine speed is near the redline) the DSG will not change to the driver's requested gear.

Current variants of the DSG will still downshift to the lowest possible gear ratio when the kick-down button is activated during full throttle whilst in manual mode. In Manual mode this kick-down is only activated by an additional button at the bottom of the accelerator pedal travel; unless this is pressed the DSG will not downshift, and will simply perform a full-throttle acceleration in whatever gear was previously being utilised.

===== Paddle shifters =====
Initially available on certain high-powered cars, and those with a "sporty" trim level—such as those using the 2.0 T FSI and 3.2/3.6 VR6 engines—steering wheel-mounted paddle shifters were available. However, these are now being offered (either as a standard inclusive fitment, or as a factory optional extra) on virtually all DSG-equipped cars, throughout all model ranges, including lesser power output applications, such as the 105 PS Volkswagen Golf Plus.

These operate in an identical manner as the floor mounted shift lever when it is placed across the gate in manual mode. The paddle shifters have two distinct advantages: the driver can safely keep both hands on the steering wheel when using the Manual/tiptronic mode; and the driver can temporarily manually override either of the automatic programmes (D or S), and gain instant manual control of the DSG transmission (within the above described constraints).

If the paddle-shift activated manual override of one of the automatic modes (D or S) is used intermittently the DSG transmission will default back to the previously selected automatic mode after a predetermined duration of inactivity of the paddles, or when the vehicle becomes stationary. Alternatively, should the driver wish to immediately revert to fully automatic control, this can be done by activating and holding the + paddle for at least two seconds.

== Advantages and disadvantages ==
=== Advantages ===
- Better fuel economy (up to 15% improvement) than conventional planetary geared automatic transmission (due to lower parasitic losses from oil churning) and for some models with manual transmissions;
- No loss of torque through the transmission from the engine to the driving wheels during up-shifts;
- Short up-shift time when shifting to a gear the alternate gear shaft has preselected;
- Smooth gear-shift operations;
- Consistent down-shift time of 600 milliseconds, regardless of throttle or operational mode;

=== Disadvantages ===
- The clutch pack mechanisms have a limited lifespan, due to excessive slippage in low-speed conditions such as stop-and-go traffic;
- Marginally worse mechanical efficiency compared to a conventional manual transmission, especially on wet-clutch variants due to electronics and hydraulic systems;
- Expensive specialist transmission fluids/lubricants with dedicated additives are required, which need regular changes;
- Relatively expensive to manufacture, and therefore increases new vehicle purchase price;
- Relatively lengthy shift time when shifting to a gear ratio which the transmission control unit did not anticipate (around 1100 ms, depending on the situation);
- Torque handling capability constraints impose a limit on after-market engine tuning modifications (though many tuners and users may exceed the official torque limits notwithstanding); (Later variants have been fitted to more powerful cars, such as the 300 bhp/350 Nm VW R36 and the 272 bhp/350 Nm Audi TTS.)
- Heavier than a comparable Getrag conventional manual transmission (75 kg (165 lb) vs. 47.5 kg (105 lb));

== Applications ==
Volkswagen Group vehicles with the DSG gearbox include:

=== Audi ===
After originally using the DSG moniker, Audi subsequently renamed their direct-shift gearbox to S tronic.

- Audi TT
- Audi A1
- Audi A3
- Audi S3
- Audi A4 (B8)
- Audi A4 (B9)
- Audi S4 (B8)
- Audi S5 (B8)
- Audi A5
- Audi A6
- Audi S6 (C7)
- Audi A7
- Audi A8 (D4)
- Audi Q2
- Audi Q3
- Audi Q5
- Audi R8 (Type 42) (From Autumn 2012 Facelift)
- Audi R8 (Type 4S)

=== Lamborghini ===
- Lamborghini Huracan

=== SEAT ===
- SEAT Ibiza
- SEAT Arona
- SEAT León
- SEAT Altea
- SEAT Toledo
- SEAT Alhambra
- SEAT Ateca
- SEAT Tarraco

=== Škoda ===
- Škoda Fabia
- Škoda Kodiaq
- Škoda Karoq (in Australia it replaced with 8-speed sourced from Aisin)
- Škoda Kamiq (except China market)
- Škoda Octavia
- Škoda Rapid (2012)
- Škoda Roomster
- Škoda Superb (MK2 & MK3)
- Škoda Yeti
- Škoda Scala
- Škoda Kushaq
- Škoda Slavia

=== Volkswagen ===
- Volkswagen Vento
- Volkswagen Santana
- Volkswagen Bora (China)
- Volkswagen Polo (paired with 6-speed TC automatic in some markets)
- Volkswagen Virtus
- Volkswagen Golf, GTI, GTD, GTE, TDI, R32, R
- Volkswagen Jetta (TDI and GLI)
- Volkswagen Eos
- Volkswagen Touran
- Volkswagen New Beetle
- Volkswagen Lamando
- Volkswagen Passat and Passat (NMS) (China & US first generation)
- Volkswagen CC
- Volkswagen Arteon (In the US, MY22+ only)
- Volkswagen Sharan
- Volkswagen Viloran
- Volkswagen Scirocco
- Volkswagen T-Cross
- Volkswagen T-Roc
- Volkswagen Taigun
- Volkswagen Taos (China FWD & US AWD)
- Volkswagen Tayron
- Volkswagen Tiguan (except US market)
- Volkswagen Teramont (China)

=== Volkswagen Commercial Vehicles ===
- Volkswagen Caddy car-derived van
- Volkswagen Transporter (T5 & T6)

== Problems and recalls of DSG-equipped vehicles ==
The 7-speed DQ200 and 6-speed DQ250 gearboxes sometimes suffer from power-loss (gear disengaging) due to short-circuiting of wires caused by a build-up of sulphur in the transmission oil.

=== United States ===
In August 2009, Volkswagen of America issued two recalls of DSG-equipped vehicles. The first involved 13,500 vehicles, and was to address unplanned shifts to the neutral gear, while the second involved similar problems (by then attributed to faulty temperature sensors) and applied to 53,300 vehicles. These recalls arose as a result of investigations carried out by the US National Highway Traffic Safety Administration (NHTSA), where owners reported to the NHTSA a loss of power whilst driving. This investigation preliminary found only 2008 and 2009 model year vehicles as being affected.

=== Australia ===
In November 2009, Volkswagen recalled certain Golf, Jetta, EOS, Passat & Caddy models equipped with 6-speed DQ250 DSG transmission because the gearbox may read the clutch temperature incorrectly, which leads to clutch protection mode, causing a loss of power.

=== China ===
Since 2009 there have been widespread concerns from Chinese consumers particularly among the online community, who expressed that Volkswagen has failed to respond to complaints about defects in its DSG-equipped vehicles. Typical issues associated with 6-speed DSG include abnormal noise and inability to change gear; while issues associated with 7-speed DSG include abnormal noise, excessive shift shock, abnormal increase in engine RPM, flashing gear indicator on the dashboard as well as inability to shift to even-numbered gears. In March 2012 China's quality watchdog the General Administration of Quality Supervision, Inspection and Quarantine (AQSIQ) said that it had been in contact with Volkswagen (China) and urged the carmaker to probe the issues. In a survey held by Gasgoo.com (China) of 2,937 industry experts and insiders, 83% of respondents believed that the carmaker should consider a full vehicle recall. In March 2012 Volkswagen Group China admitted that there could be an issue in its seven-speed DSG gearboxes that may affect approximately 500,000 vehicles from its various subsidiaries in China. A software upgrade has since been offered for the affected vehicles in an attempt to repair the problem.

According to 163.com – one of China's most popular web portals – in March 2012 about a quarter of the complaints about problems found in cars in China's automotive market were made against DSG-equipped vehicles manufactured by Volkswagen. The top five models that dominate those complaints were:

- Volkswagen Magotan – 6%
- Volkswagen Bora – 5.3%
- Volkswagen Sagitar – 5.3%
- Volkswagen Touareg – 4.7%
- Volkswagen Golf – 4%

The Touareg has never been fitted with a DSG transmission.

On 15 March 2013, China Central Television aired a program for the World Consumer Rights Day. The program criticized the issue associated with DSG-equipped vehicles manufactured by Volkswagen. On 17 March 2013 Volkswagen Group China announced on its official Weibo that it will voluntarily recall vehicles equipped with DSG boxes. Some sources have estimated the failure rate of DSG-equipped vehicles sold in China to be greater than 20,000 per million sold.

=== Sweden ===
VW Sweden stopped selling the Passat EcoFuel DSG as a taxi after many cars had problems with the 7 speed DSG gearbox. They instead offered the Touran EcoFuel DSG, which uses an updated version of the same DSG gearbox.

=== Japan ===
The recall has been extended to Japan with 91,000 (VW and Audi using the same DSG) being recalled.

=== Malaysia ===
13 days after the Singapore recall, Volkswagen Malaysia also announced a recall for the 7-speed DSG. No official statement was released by the company, but it was stated that a total of 3,962 were involved in the unit recall exercise – units produced between June 2010 and June 2011, with affected vehicles being Golf, Polo, Scirocco, Cross Touran, Passat and Jetta models equipped with the transmission.

=== Australian recall ===
15 October 2019, Australia recall of DSG 7-speed gearboxes. Due to a production fault, over time a crack in the transmissions pressure accumulator can occur. If the pressure accumulator cracks, oil and pressure is lost in the hydraulic system of the gearbox. As a result, the transmission of engine power via the gearbox is interrupted. The experience of this symptom would be comparable to depressing the clutch in a vehicle fitted with a manual transmission. This could increase the likelihood of an accident affecting the occupants of the vehicle and other road users.

== See also ==
- List of ZF transmissions
- List of Aisin transmissions
- List of GM transmissions
- List of Ford transmissions
- Automated manual transmission
