= Madman of the route =

Purported unidentified Argentine serial killer

Details
- Victims: 14
- Span of crimes: 1996–1999
- Country: Argentina
- State: Buenos Aires
- Date apprehended: N/A

The Madman of the route (Spanish: El loco de la ruta) is the nickname given to an alleged serial killer active in Mar de Plata, Argentina from 1996 to 1999. The allegations claim that a single killer is responsible for the murders and disappearances of at least 14 prostitutes, some of which were later found raped and mutilated near highways, sometimes with words written on their bodies.

Since the emergence of this theory, several suspects have been proposed and charged, including a group of corrupt police officers, but none were convicted. To date, none of the murders have been definitively solved.

== Murders ==
On 29 November 1995, the body of 35-year-old María Esther Amaro was found on the side of Provincial Route 55. She had been strangled, and the word puta (bitch) had been written on her back with a sharp object, presumably a knife.

On 1 December 1996, the naked body of 26-year-old Adriana Jaqueline Fernández, an artisan and prostitute from Uruguay, was found under a bridge along National Route 226. She had been strangled. Suspicions initially fell on her ex-boyfriend, who had previously served a sentence for murder, but there was insufficient evidence to charge him.

On 21 January 1997, police located a torso and two arms along Provincial Route 88 but were unable to find the other remains. The body parts were identified as those of 26-year-old Viviana Guadalupe Espinosa Spíndola, a local prostitute who had recently gone missing. On 13 May, the body of another prostitute, 27-year-old Mariela Elizabeth Giménez, was also found along Provincial Route 88. Like Espinosa, her arms had been cut off, and she had cuts on her buttocks, but was determined to have been manually strangled. Hours after the discovery, a bouquet of flowers was found at the crime scene, which was later determined to be the work of a crime scene photographer who had offered his condolences.

The last confirmed homicide attributed to the Madman took place on 20 October 1998. On that day, the legs of 25-year-old María del Carmen Leguizamón were found on Provincial Route 88, near Barrio Las Heras. The rest of her body was never found.

Additionally, between 21 July 1997, and 1999, a total of nine other prostitutes disappeared: Ana María Nores, Patricia Angélica Prieto, Silvana Paola Caraballo, Claudia Jacqueline Romero, Verónica Andrea Chávez, Mirta Bordón, Sandra Villanueva, Mercedes Almaraz and Fernanda Varón. Despite the fact that they have never been found, their disappearances are also attributed to the Madman.

== Investigation ==
In response to the crimes, the Ministry of Justice and Security announced a reward of 30,000 pesos for anyone who could provide information leading to the killer's arrest. This was later increased to 500,000 pesos.

In 1997, the Buenos Aires Police Department created a "Serial Homicide Division" and asked for advice from the FBI and the French National Police.

The first leads came from interviewing witnesses who had last seen the victims. According to some of them, they had seen a burgundy Ford Galaxy cruising the area at the time of the crimes, and in at least two cases (those of Amaro and Nores), they had seen the victims enter the vehicle. The witnesses described the man as about 45 years of age, stocky, balding and with some blonde hair left. On 26 June 1997, police seized the car of José Luis Andújar, the owner of a disco located along Provincial Route 88. After examining his car for three days, traces of blood and black-colored hair were found on the carpet. Genetic tests concluded that they were of human origin, but had no relation to the deaths and disappearances.

On the day of Chávez's disappearance, the 25-year-old was last seen attending her job as a checkroom attendant at a dance club in Mar de Plata. Days later, a diary with the names and telephone numbers of her regular clients were found inside her home. Among them were police officers and politicians, including prosecutor Marcelo García Berro. As a result, Judge Pedro Hooft ordered to intercept all registered phone numbers and to investigate all calls from the Salta 1337 brothel, where at least three of the twelve victims worked.

On 9 August, Hooft ordered the arrest of ten police officers and four civilians who were formally accused in the disappearances of Nores, Chávez and Caraballo. They were also investigated for involvement in the other cases, but were never tried for lack of evidence. The group was allegedly led by lieutenant Alberto Adrián Iturburu and protected by Berro. According to the case file, the gang was in charge of extorting prostitutes by forcing them to pay 100 pesos in order to "protect" and let them work. Thus, in theory, those who did not pay or wanted out of the deal would be killed.

Despite the investigators' best efforts, the gang could never be linked to the three disappearances, nor to the other deaths, and were acquitted in 2004. To this day, all murders and disappearances linked to this case remain unsolved.

== Known suspects ==
- The "Police Mafia" led by Alberto Adrián Iturburu: brought to trial, but acquitted, in the disappearances of Nores, Chávez and Caraballo. Despite this, they remain the most popular suspects, with many believing that the "Madman of the route" was an invention by Berro to cover up their crimes.
- Héctor Julián Barroso: grocer who was sentenced to 30 years imprisonment for murdering two prostitutes in 2003 and 2004. According to investigators, Barroso and an accomplice, Juan Carlos Sánchez Gazpio, committed a series of robberies, rapes and murders during the 1990s, with allegations that they may have killed up to 14 women, including some of the Madman's victims. This, however, has never been conclusively proven.
- Guillermo Moreno: pig farmer and partner of Amaro at the time of her disappearance. He was tried for her murder in 2003 but was found not guilty and acquitted of all charges. Despite this, some people still believe that he was the Madman.
- Margarita "Pepita la Pistolera" Di Tullio: thief, drug trafficker and pimp who owned two brothels in Buenos Aires Province. She is best known for killing three men who attempted to rape her in 1985, in what was deemed a justified homicide. Some believe that she may have been the Madman since five of the victims had previously worked for her, but the prevailing sentiment was that she was framed by police.
- José Luis Andújar: owner of the "Jardín Boliviano" disco along Province Route 88, where several of the victims were found or disappeared. The police confiscated his car, a burgundy Ford Galaxy, as it matched the description of the killer's supposed vehicle. Likewise, several prostitutes accused him of being the Madman because he supposedly resembled the suspect. He has since been cleared as a suspect and continues to assert his innocence.
- Celso Luis Arrastía: serial killer who was convicted and sentenced to 25 years imprisonment for murdering two prostitutes in 1988, but is generally thought to be responsible for five in total. Some people suggested that he might be responsible due to the similarities in the crimes, but he has been cleared as a suspect.

== In popular culture ==
In 2007, the mystery novel The Seer's Prayer (Spanish: La plegaria del vidente), written by Carlos Balmaceda, was published. It was inspired by the case, and in 2011, it was adapted into film.

The song 'Desmembrado', released by Argentine death metal band Morferus in 2019, is also inspired by this case.

== See also ==
- List of serial killers by country
