= Ford I4 DOHC engine =

Ford I4 DOHC
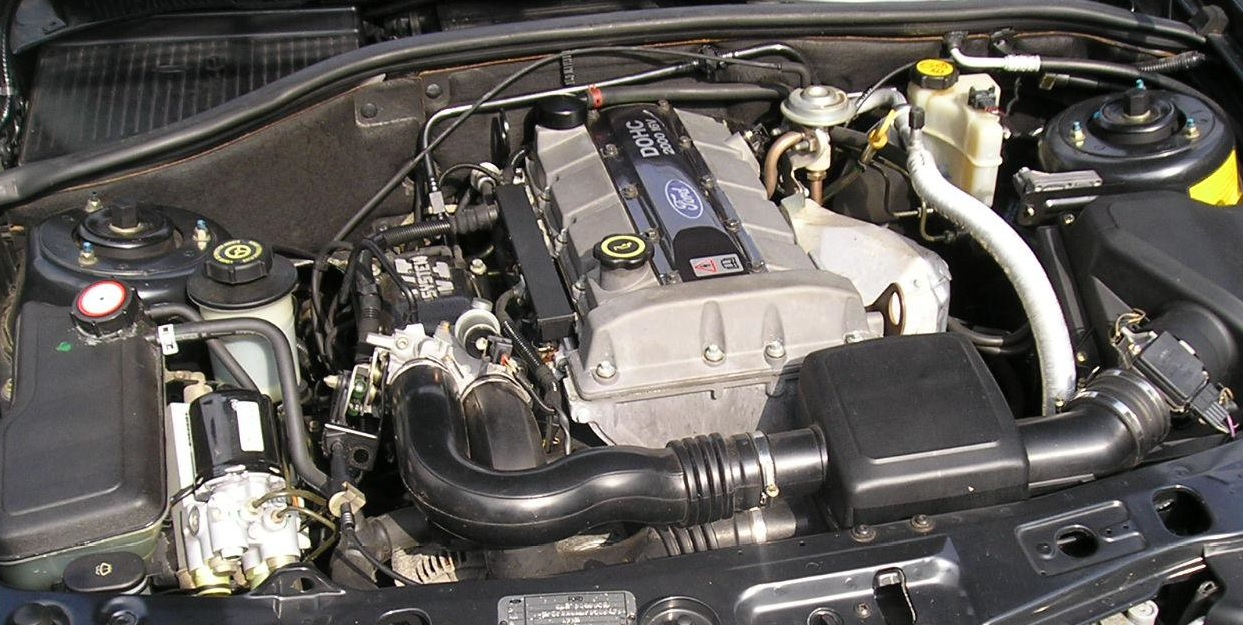
- 2-litre 16 valve DOHC in Ford Scorpio

Overview
- Manufacturer: Ford Motor Company
- Production: 1989–2006

Layout
- Configuration: Naturally aspirated I4
- Displacement: 2.0 L (1,998 cc); 2.3 L (2,295 cc)
- Cylinder bore: 86 mm (3.39 in); 89.6 mm (3.53 in)
- Piston stroke: 86 mm (3.39 in); 91 mm (3.58 in)
- Cylinder block material: Cast iron
- Cylinder head material: Aluminium
- Valvetrain: DOHC, 2 or 4 valves × cyl.
- Compression ratio: 9.8:1, 10.0:1, 10.3:1

Combustion
- Fuel system: Carburettor (N8x only); Multi-point fuel injection
- Management: Ford EEC-IV, EEC-V
- Fuel type: Petrol
- Oil system: Wet sump
- Cooling system: Water-cooled

Output
- Power output: 107–150 hp (80–112 kW)
- Torque output: 171–210 N⋅m (126–155 lb⋅ft)

Emissions
- Emissions control systems: Catalytic converter (N9C/N9D/N9E/NSD/NSE)

Chronology
- Predecessor: Ford Pinto engine
- Successor: Ford Duratec engine

The Ford DOHC engine is an inline 4-cylinder (I4) automotive internal combustion engine with dual overhead camshafts (DOHC), produced by the Ford Motor Company. Offered from 1989 until 2006, it was initially available as a 2.0-litre 8-valve engine, and later in 2.0 and 2.3-litre 16-valve versions. It powered various Ford models in both front wheel drive and rear wheel drive applications. It was Ford's first in-house twincam engine design to reach volume production.

== History ==
In Ford's technical reference the engine is given the somewhat anonymous designation of "DOHC". Some sources call it the Sierra engine, but only when used in that car, and in some enthusiast forums it is known informally as the "twincam", or the "twink". Its lack of recognition extends to the aftermarket, as few tuning shops offer options for the engine, and it does not appear in Ford's own list of four-cylinder racing engines.

The engine was designed to replace the 2.0-litre OHC Pinto engine, which by the late 1980s was lagging behind the competition in terms of power output, efficiency and refinement. Apart from the inline configuration and approximate displacement, the DOHC shares nothing with the Pinto engine, and is described as a "clean sheet" design.

The DOHC was produced at Ford's Dagenham Engine Plant in London.

In late 1989, the DOHC was launched in 8-valve form in the rear-wheel drive Ford Sierra, Sierra Sapphire, and Scorpio (in the United Kingdom and Ireland, the MkI Scorpio retained the previous model's name and was sold as the Ford Granada MkIII). In these cars it was mated to either the new all-synchromesh MT-75 5-speed manual transmission or the existing A4LD four-speed automatic. The engine received mixed reviews, being seen as an improvement over the Pinto, but not the leap forward expected.

The MkV Escort had been launched in 1990 to disappointing reviews, and Ford were looking to boost the image of this critically important range. To that end they introduced two new high-performance Escort sub-models for the hot hatch market, the RS2000 and XR3i. The RS2000 debuted in 1991, with a DOHC engine mounted transversely in a FWD application using a revised block with different mount locations. Engines in these cars also received a new multivalve cylinder head and tubular exhaust manifold. In the Escort RS2000 16V, the 2.0-litre DOHC developed 150 PS (110 kW; 148 bhp). The XR3i followed in 1992 with the choice of two 1.8-litre versions of the new Zeta engine.

The Sierra was discontinued in 1993 and the RS2000 in 1996, but the DOHC continued in use in the Ford Galaxy MPV launched in 1995. By this time, a 2.3-litre 16-valve version of the engine was offered alongside the original 2.0-litre in both 8-valve and 16-valve versions. The 2.3-litre also appeared in the Ford Scorpio and the Ford Transit van. The DOHC remained the main petrol engine for the original Galaxy until its 2006 redesign, after which production of the DOHC ended.

== Versions and features ==
All DOHC engines have a cast iron block and an aluminium cylinder head. The sump is also of cast aluminium with built-in webs and serves to stiffen the whole engine assembly. The block has five main bearings for the crankshaft.

The two overhead camshafts are driven by a timing chain. Each camshaft has five bearings. The camshafts operate the valves and dual valve springs through hydraulic tappets.

The oil pump is driven off the crankshaft by a single roller chain.

=== 8-valve, 2.0 L engines ===
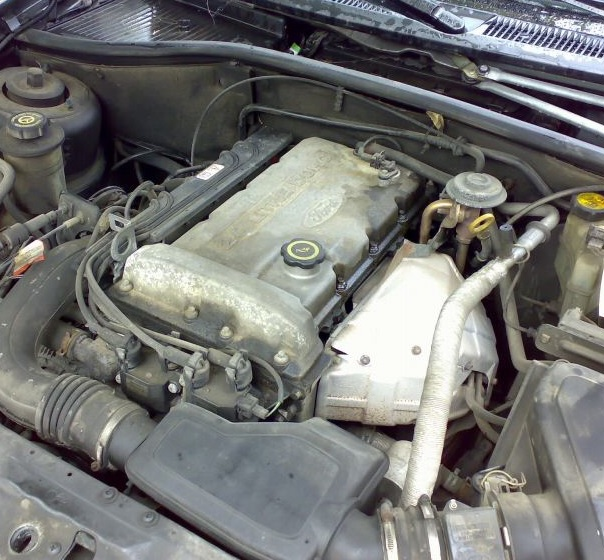
2.0 L 8 valve DOHC in Ford Scorpio

The 8-valve, 2.0 L DOHC is a "square" engine, with bore and stroke measuring the same at 86 mm (3.39 in). There are two valves per cylinder. The compression ratio is 10.3:1 in early engines, and was reduced to 9.8:1 in some later applications. The intake camshaft profiles for carburettor and injection engines are different, while the exhaust camshafts are the same.

==== N8A/N8B ====
- One 2-barrel Weber 2V TLD carburettor, no emission controls.
- Power: 79 kW (106 hp) at 5600 rpm.
- Torque: 171 N⋅m (126 lb⋅ft) at 3000 rpm.

==== N8C/N8D ====
- One 2-barrel Weber 2V TLD carburettor, unregulated catalytic converter
- Power: 75 kW (101 hp) at 5500 rpm.
- Torque: 166 N⋅m (122 lb⋅ft) at 3000 rpm.

==== N9A/N9B ====
- Electronic fuel injection (Batched multi-point), no emission controls
- Power: 90 kW (121 hp) at 5500 rpm.
- Torque: 171 N⋅m (126 lb⋅ft) at 2500 rpm.

==== N9C/N9D/N9E/NSE ====
- Electronic fuel injection (Batched multi-point) (N9x with EEC4, NSx with EEC5 [distributor-less])
- Regulated 3-way catalytic converter
- Power: 87 kW (117 hp) at 5500 rpm
- Torque: 171 N⋅m (126 lb⋅ft) at 2500 rpm.

==== Applications ====
- Sierra
- Sierra Sapphire
- Scorpio GenI (also called the Granada MkIII)
- Scorpio GenII
- Transit GenII

=== 16-valve, 2.0 L engines ===
The 16-valve 2-litre engines replaced the 8-valve cylinder head with a new 16-valve assembly. Bore and stroke are unchanged from the 8-valve engine.

==== N7A ====
- Compression: 10.3:1
- Engine management: EEC-IV controlled multi-point fuel injection
- Power: 150 hp (112 kW) at 6000 rpm
- Torque: 190 N⋅m (140 lb⋅ft) at 4500 rpm

==== N3A ====
- Compression: 9.8:1
- Engine management: EEC-V controlled multi-point fuel injection
- Power: 136 hp (101 kW) at 6300 rpm
- Torque: 175 N⋅m (129 lb⋅ft) at 4200 rpm

==== Applications ====
- Escort XR3i and RS2000 16V
- Scorpio GenII
- Galaxy GenI

=== 16-valve, 2.3 L engines ===
An enlarged, slightly undersquare version of the engine was developed with bore × stroke increased to 89.6 mm × 91 mm (3.53 in × 3.58 in), for a total displacement of 2.3 L (2,295 cc). The 2.3-litre engine also received a cylinder block stiffened by additional webbing, a split-mass flywheel, and a revised intake system.

Another change for the 2.3-litre was the addition of two engine balance shafts located in an enclosure bolted to the bottom of the cylinder block, with a revised sump below that. The shafts were driven from the oil pump drive chain, made longer for the purpose. The system was developed jointly by Ford of Europe, Cosworth Engineering, and FEV Motorentechnik. With rubber-coated teeth on the balance shafts and the other changes to the engine, interior noise was reduced by 6 decibels.

==== Y5A/Y5B ====
- Compression: 10.0:1
- Engine management: EEC-V controlled multi-point fuel injection
- Power: 145 hp (108 kW) at 5600 rpm
- Torque: 210 N⋅m (155 lb⋅ft) at 4500 rpm

==== Applications ====
- Galaxy GenI
- Scorpio GenII
- Transit GenIII

== Problems ==
The DOHC is reported to exhibit certain weaknesses or be prone to particular types of failures, without specifying whether they are the result of design flaws or poor maintenance. These issues may include:

- Timing chains that stretch or break
- A blocked cooling system, potentially leading to overheating and a failed cylinder head gasket
- A cracked cylinder head
- Worn hydraulic tappets
- Spark plugs seized in the head
- Problems with engine electrics
- A blocked oil spray bar
- Leaks from seals and gaskets

== Gallery ==
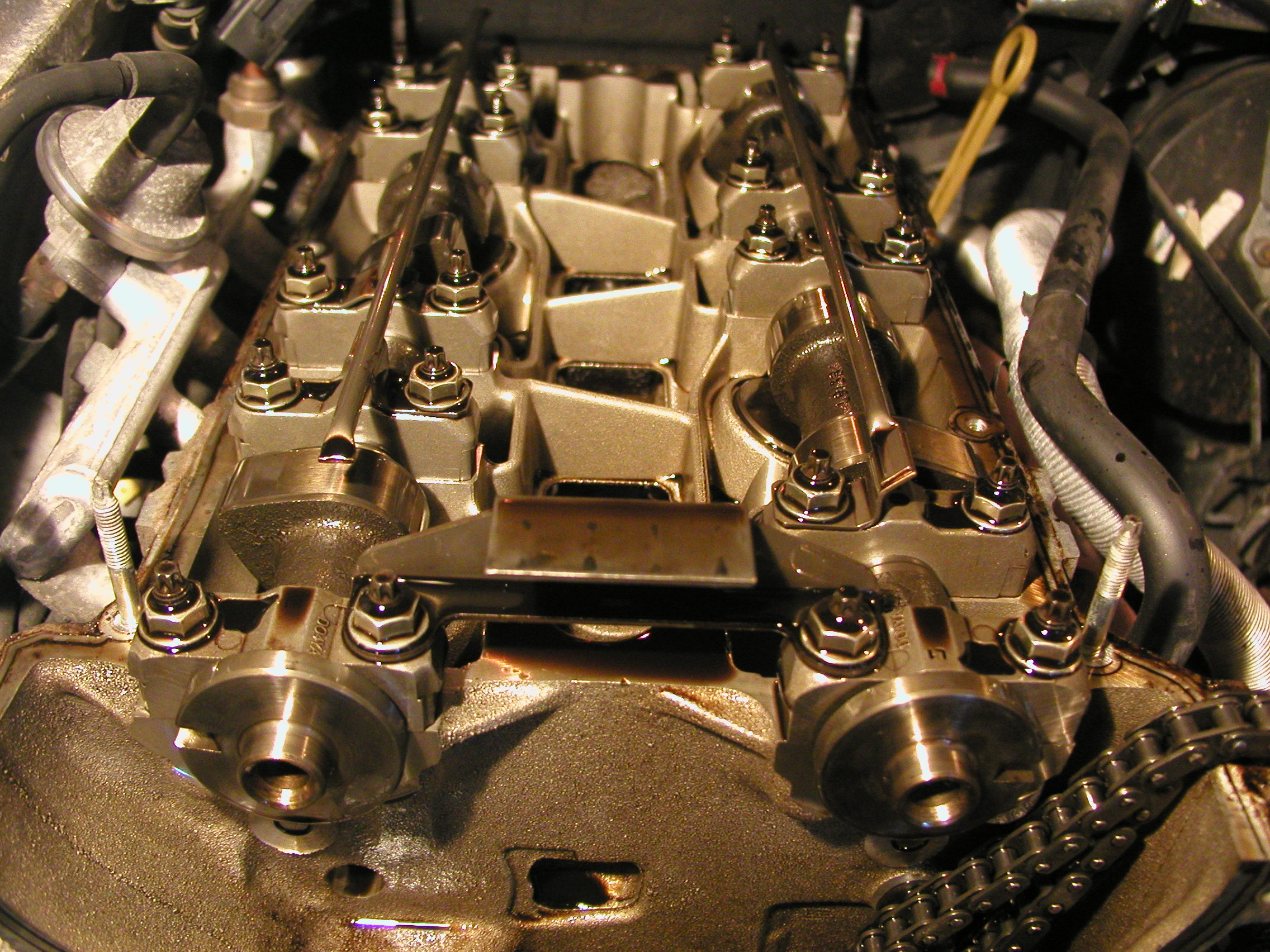
Cylinder head with camshafts

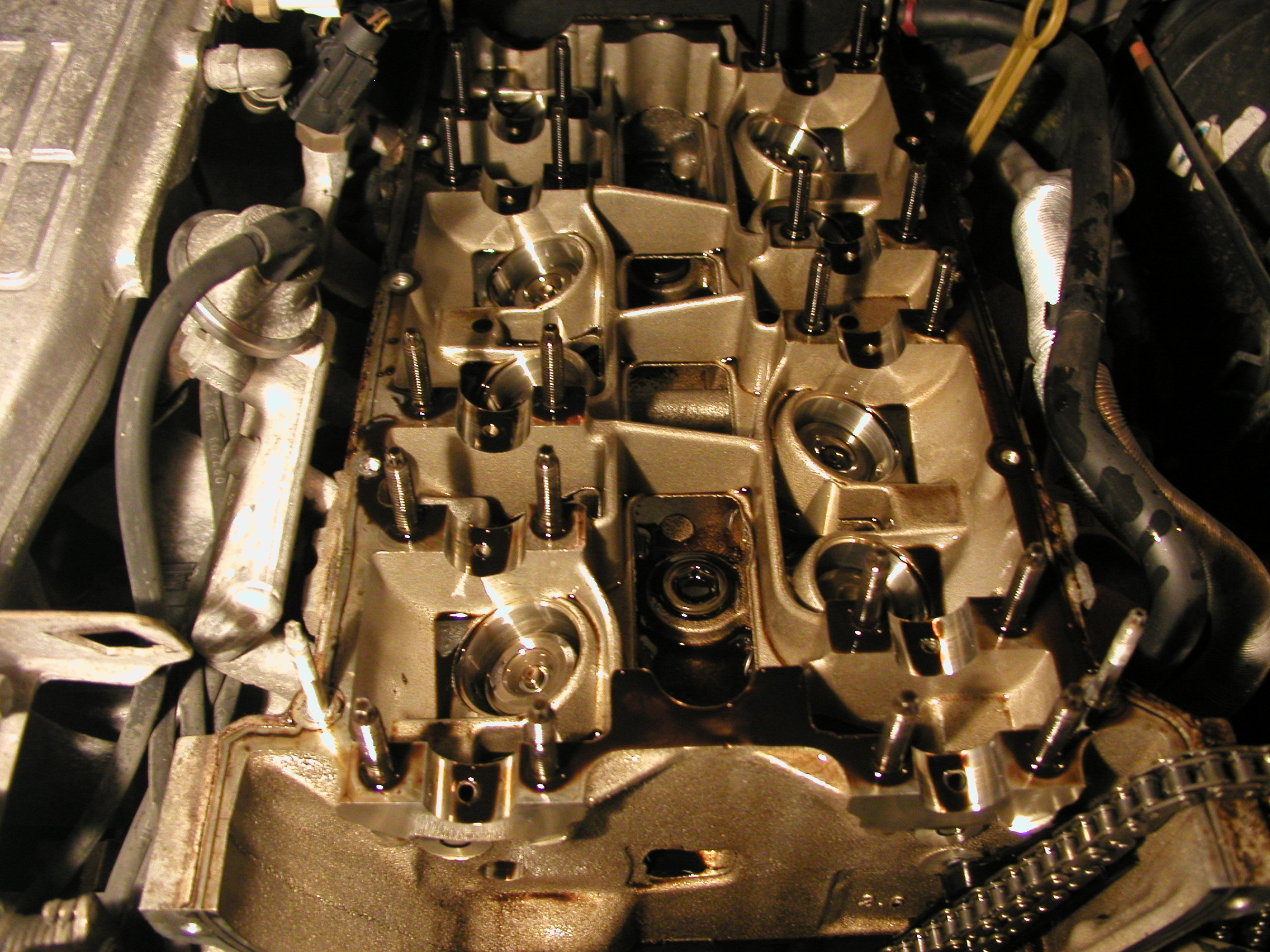
Cylinder head without cam drive or valve lifters

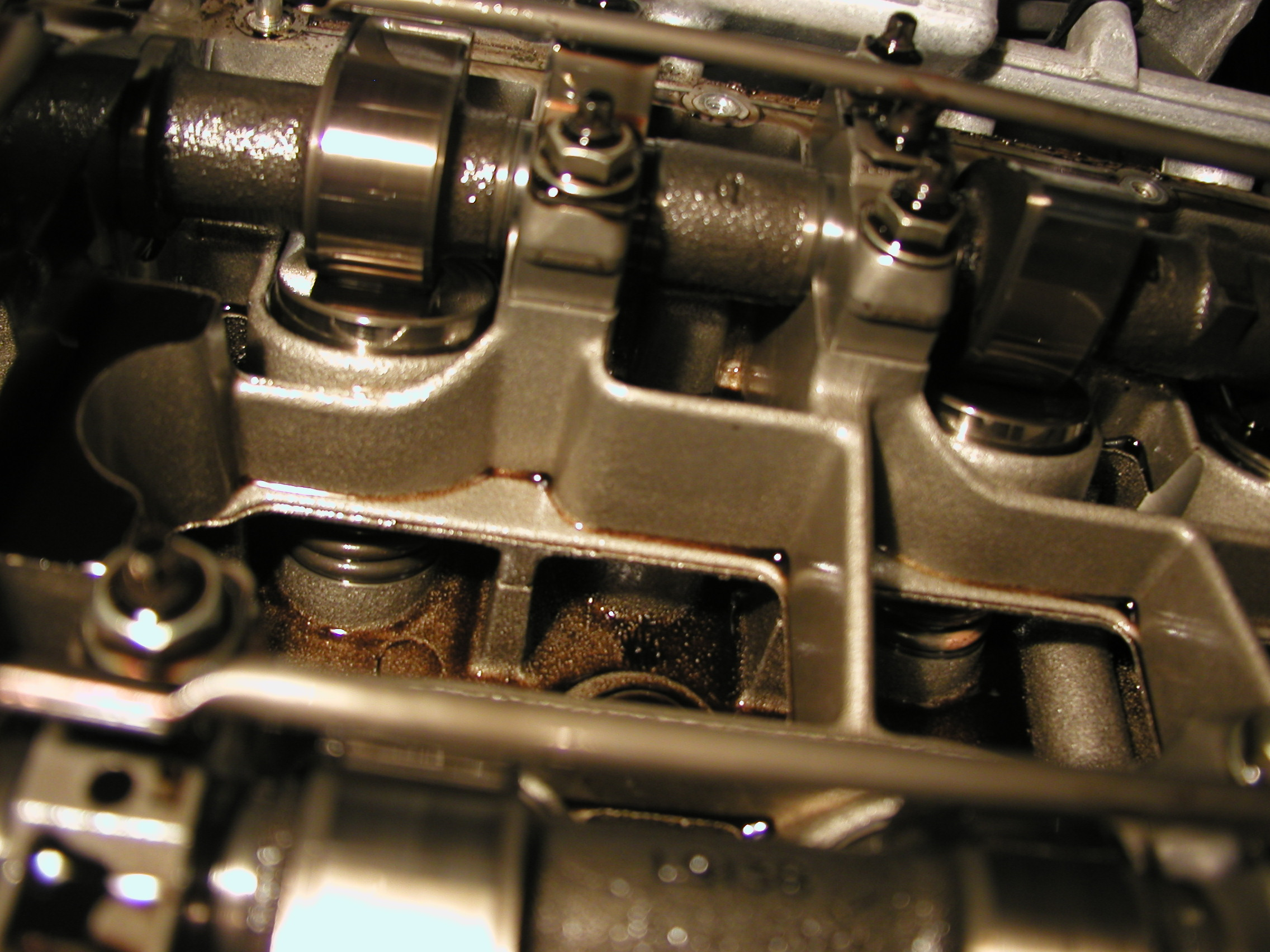
Close-up of cam profile and valve lifter

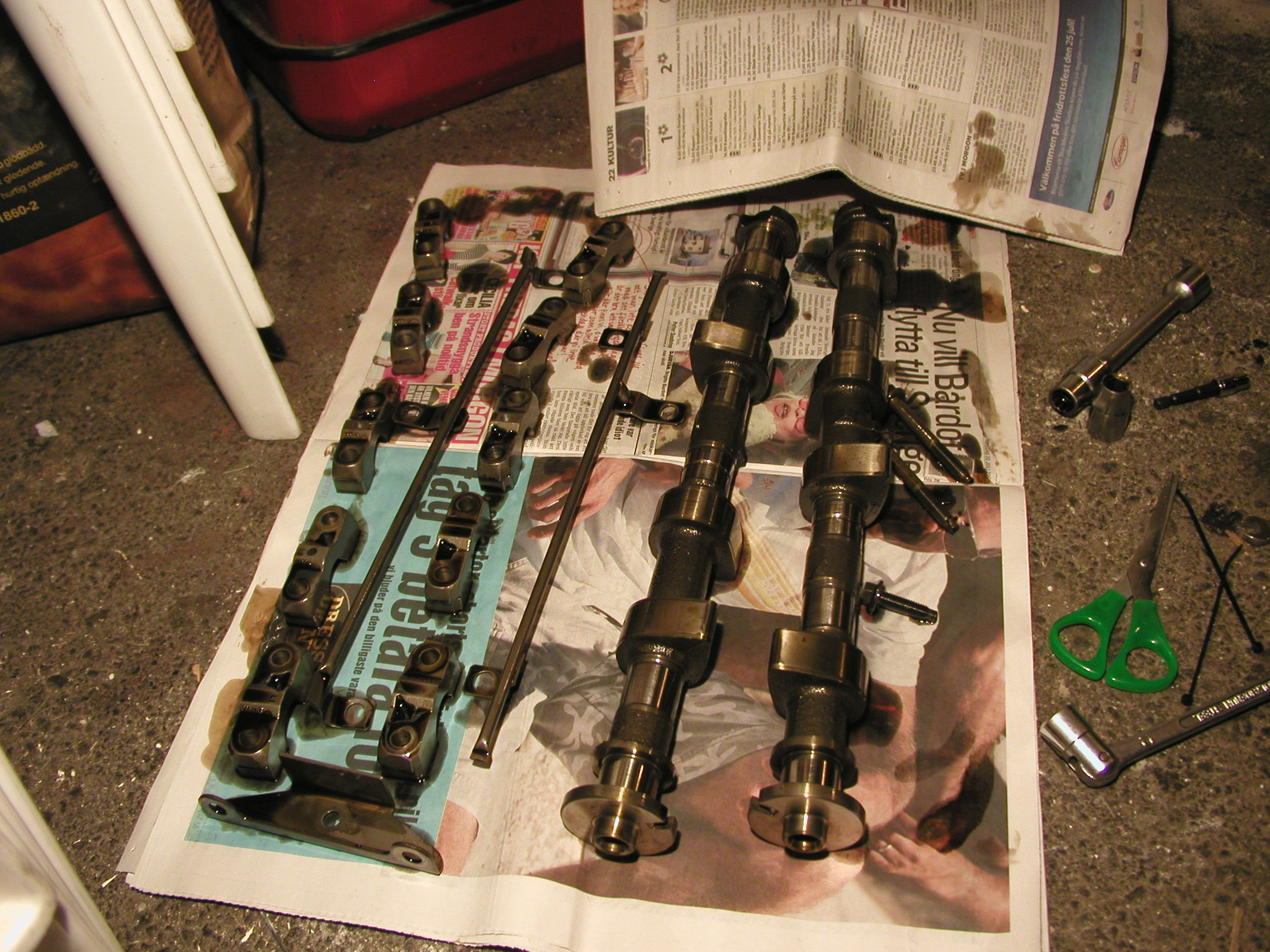
Camshafts unmounted from the engine

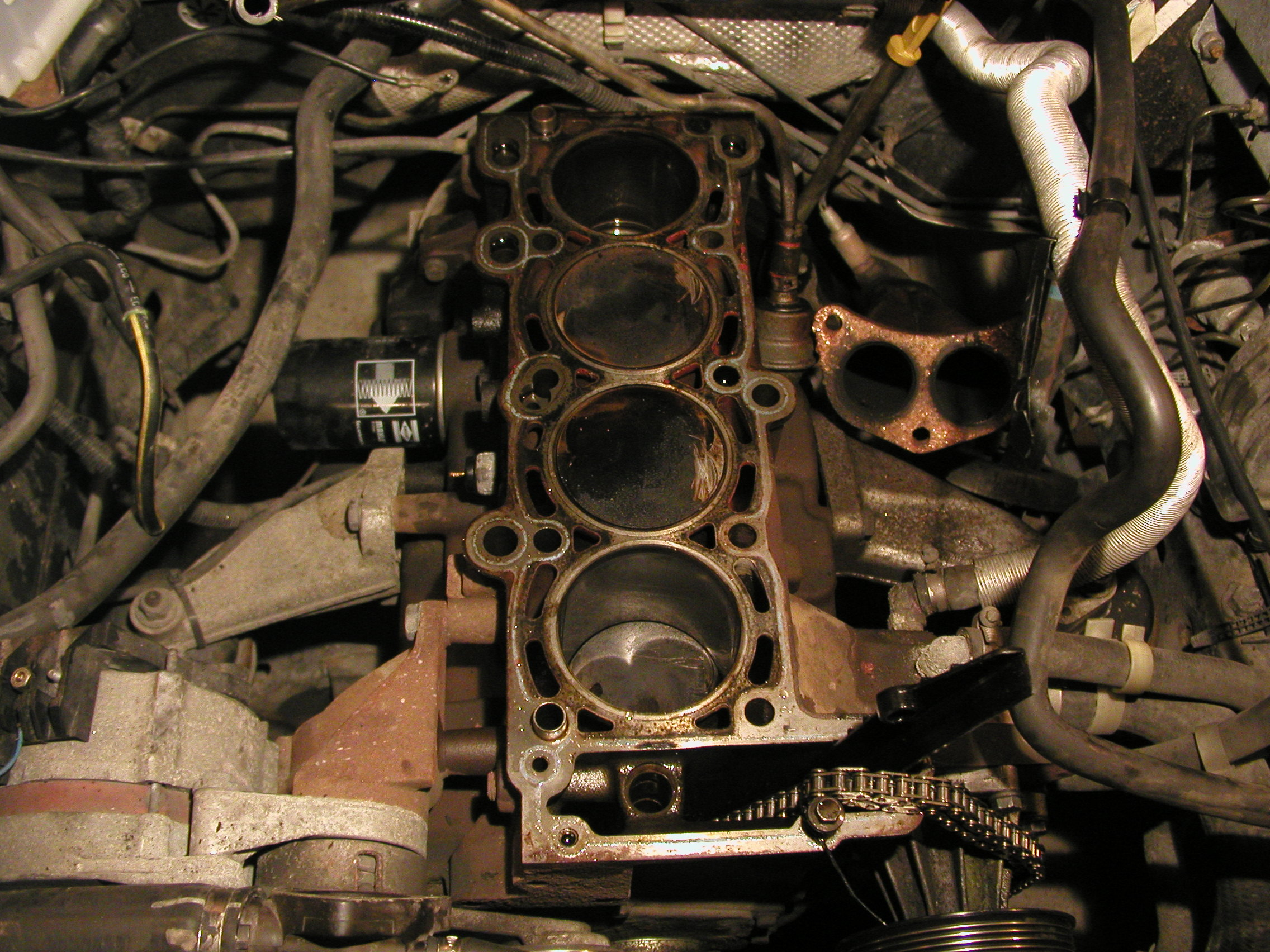
Engine block with cylinder head removed

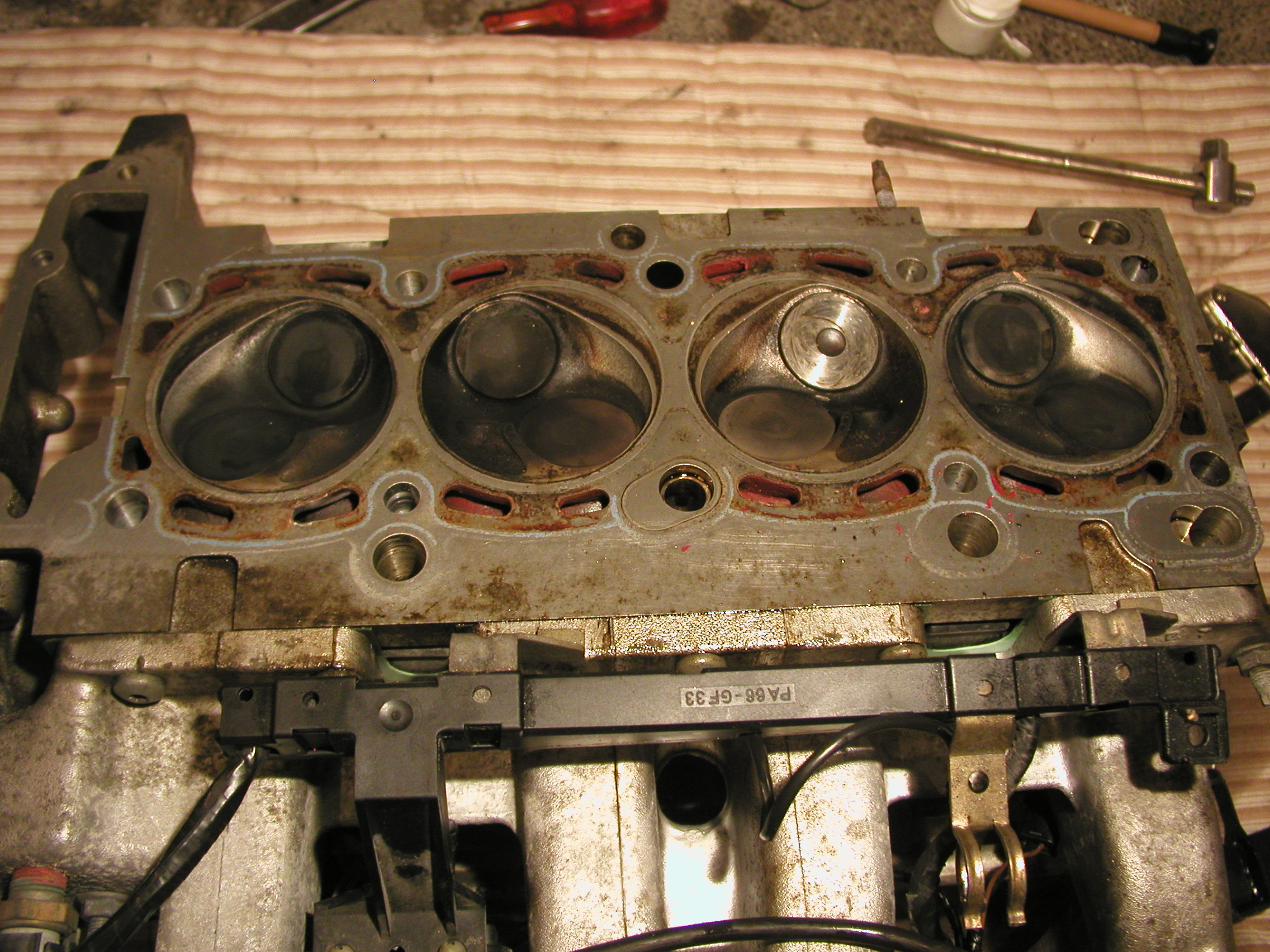
Cylinder head seen from its bottom side

== See also ==
- List of Ford engines
