= Celso Luis Arrastía =

Argentine criminal

- Born: 1950 (age 75–76); Mar del Plata, Argentina
- Citizenship: Argentine
- Years active: 1987–1988
- Known for: Mar del Plata serial rapes and murders, suspect in the "Loco de la Ruta" cases
- Status: Released (2003)
- Convictions: Two counts of murder; multiple counts of rape
- Criminal charges: Murder, kidnapping, and sexual assault
- Penalty: 25 years imprisonment

Details
- Victims: Ana María Palomino, Margarita Inés López (convicted); 3 others (suspected)
- Locations: Mar del Plata, Buenos Aires Province
- Weapons: Firearm, ligatures (panties)
- Date apprehended: September 1988
- Imprisoned at: 1988–2003

Celso Luis Arrastía (born 1950) is an Argentine murderer, serial rapist, and suspected serial killer.

== Early life and crimes ==
Arrastía was born around 1950 in Mar del Plata. Between the spring of 1987 and summer of 1988, five women (four of them sex workers) were raped and murdered in Mar del Plata. Arrastía was arrested in September 1988, after his wife reported him to the police for repeated threats and beatings. Arrastía's wife reported that he told her that he had murdered these five women.

After his arrest, Arrastía denied committing any crime, but was nonetheless taken to trial for the murder spree. In October 1987, a young couple walked at night when they were intercepted by an armed man in civilian clothes; both were kidnapped and taken to a nearby car. The man drove to a secluded area and forced the young man out of the car, shot him and left. The youth survived, but the 16-year-old girl was found raped and murdered the next day.

As more sexual assaults were reported throughout Mar del Plata, a 19-year-old woman, who was involved in street prostitution, was found raped and murdered at a motel. The woman, similarly to another three cases, had bite wounds in her body and had been strangled with her own panties. Police managed to draw an identikit of the serial rapist and suspected murderer, but no calls were made to advance the investigation.

In September 1988, a woman went to a Mar del Plata police station and said that her husband was the man behind the murders. The woman said that her husband mistreated and threatened her. Police raided the home and arrested the man, Celso Luis Arrastía, and charged him with the murder and rape spree.

In 1989, the Federal Court of Mar del Plata convicted Arrastía of the murder of the 16-year-old girl (Palomino) and the 19-year-old sex worker (López), but acquitted him of other crimes. Arrastía was sentenced to 25 years in prison, and was released early in 2003. He continues to deny his crimes.

Arrastía is a prime suspect in the serial killings of the Madman of the route.

== Charges and convictions ==
Table of charges
Count	Victim and age	Charge	Date of death	Verdict
1	Ana María Palomino (16)	Murder	17 October 1987	Guilty
2	Mónica Susana Petit de Murat (?)	Murder	Early 1988	Not guilty
3	Nélida Mabel Quintana (53)	Murder	May 1988	Not guilty
4	Margarita Inés López (19)	Murder	May 1988	Guilty
5	Unidentified woman (?)	Murder	June 1988	Not guilty
