= Ford Galaxy =

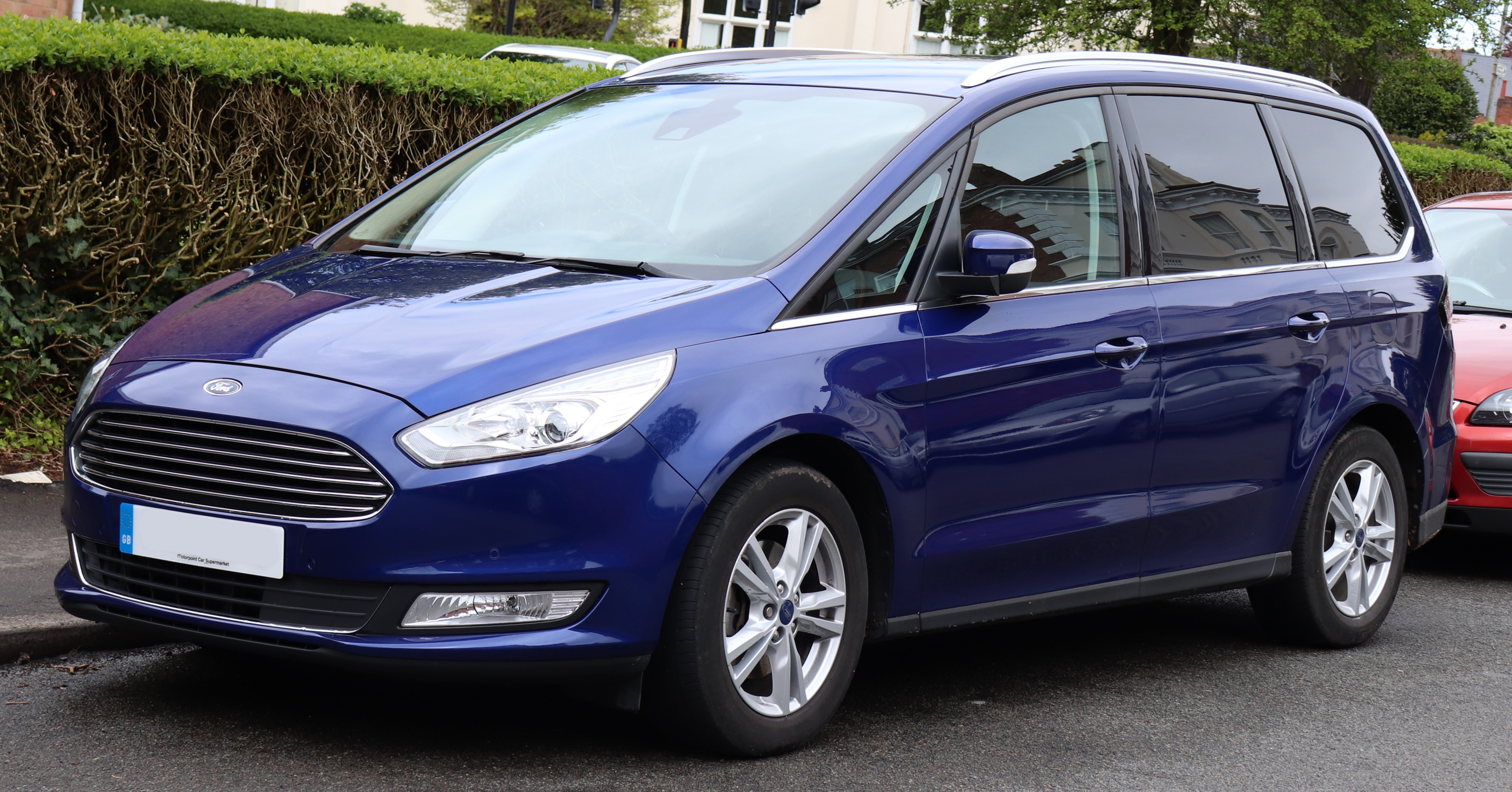
- 2016 Ford Galaxy Titanium TDCi 2.0 (UK)

Overview
- Manufacturer: Ford of Europe
- Also called: Volkswagen Sharan (1995−2006); SEAT Alhambra (1995−2006)
- Production: June 1995 − April 2023

Body and chassis
- Class: Large MPV (M)
- Body style: 5-door MPV
- Layout: Front-engine, front-wheel-drive; Front-engine, four-wheel-drive

The Ford Galaxy is a seven-seater car produced by Ford of Europe from June 1995 to April 2023. Considered in the motor industry to be a large multi-purpose vehicle (MPV), it was the first Ford-brand MPV produced and marketed outside of North America, the model line is currently in its third generation. Sharing its platform architecture with the Ford Mondeo, the Galaxy was developed alongside the Ford S-Max; the model line is slotted between the Connect and Custom variants of the Ford Tourneo/Transit model family.

In contrast to the American-designed Ford Aerostar and Chrysler Voyager (both imported to Europe), the Galaxy is configured with four sedan-style doors (in line with the Renault Espace).

== First generation (V191; 1995) ==
First generation (Mk I, Mk II)
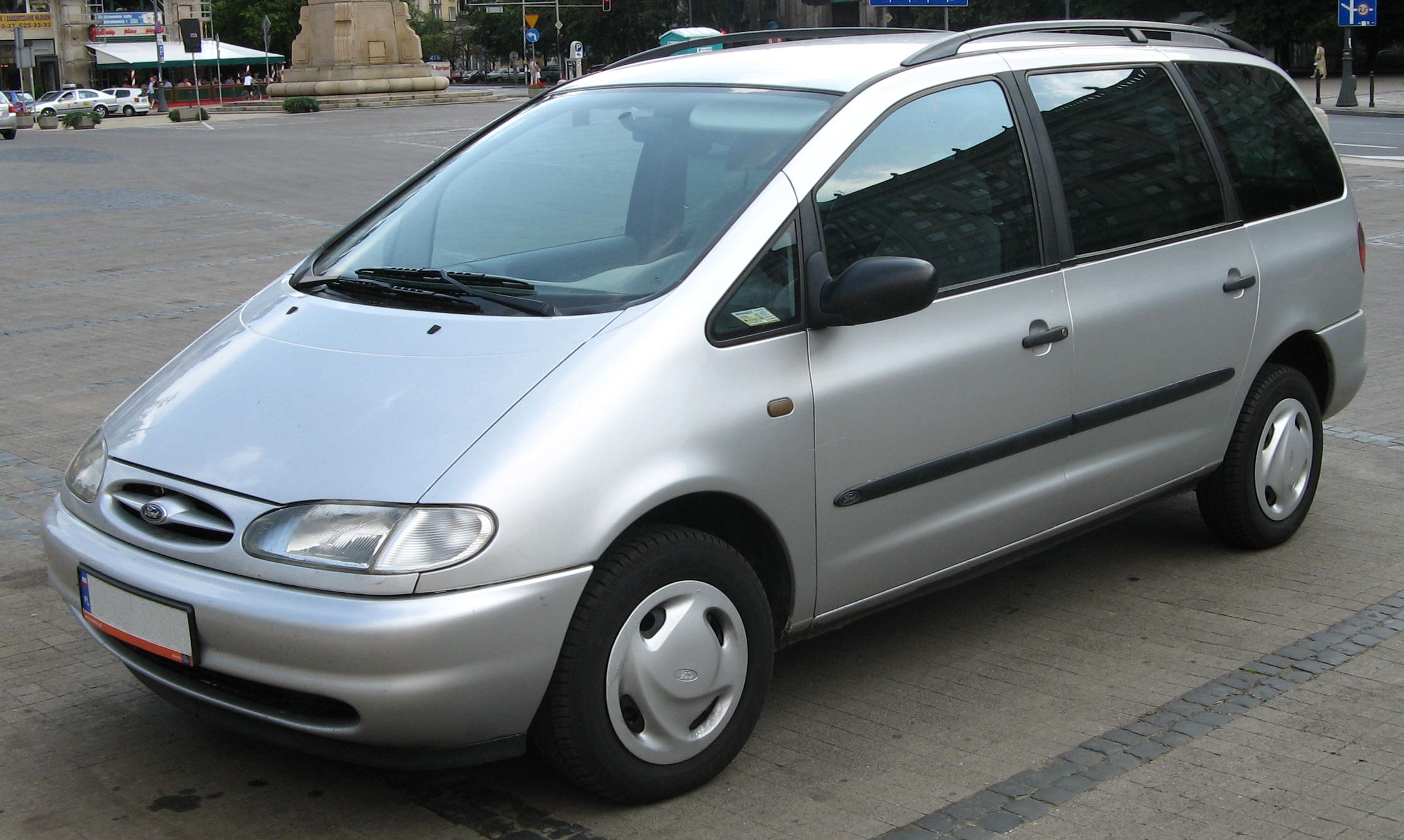
- Galaxy Mk I (1995−2000)

Overview
- Also called: Volkswagen Sharan (until 2010); SEAT Alhambra (until 2010)
- Production: June 1995–2006
- Assembly: Portugal: Palmela (AutoEuropa)
- Designer: Greg M. Greeson (1990)

Body and chassis
- Platform: Volkswagen Group B-VX62
- Related: Volkswagen Sharan; SEAT Alhambra

Powertrain
- Engine: petrol engines: 2.0i DOHC; 2.3i DOHC; 2.8i VR6 diesel engine: 1.9 TDI 90 bhp (67 kW) or 110 bhp (82 kW) 116 bhp (87 kW) 131 bhp (98 kW)

The first Galaxy was designed as a joint venture product between Ford and the Volkswagen Group. Produced at the joint-venture AutoEuropa plant in Palmela, Portugal, the vehicle was badge-engineered to create three vehicles: the Ford Galaxy; by Volkswagen as the Volkswagen Sharan; and by SEAT as the Alhambra. Production started in May 1995.

The Galaxy used predominantly Volkswagen Group mechanicals, most notably the 2.8-litre VR6 petrol engine from the top versions of the Volkswagen Golf, as well as Volkswagen Group's 1.9-litre Turbocharged Direct Injection (TDI) turbo-diesel unit. Initially only the 2.0-litre inline-four petrol version used a Ford powerplant – this derived from the Ford I4 DOHC engine. In later years, this unit was supplemented by a 2.3-litre 16 valve version first seen in the facelifted Ford Scorpio. This engine was transversely mounted as opposed to longitudinal mounting like in the Scorpio.

The 2.8-litre VR6 model was also available with an optional four-wheel-drive system, however this did not reappear on the second generation.

All of the VW Group sourced engines were supplied with "Ford" badges on the rocker covers, despite being VW Group designs. All automatic transmissions were VW Group AG4 boxes, but manual gearboxes on all engines were VXT75 five speeds (modified versions of the trusted Ford MTX-75 five speed set-up to suit the transverse engine layout).

The original interior used a mix of both Ford and VW Group components, using a Volkswagen Golf-derived instrument pack, and most of the switchgear, while the curved fascia moulding was of Ford design, heavily reminiscent of that used in the Ford Mondeo.

=== Public reaction ===
In 1999, the MkI Ford Galaxy was rated in a Top Gear magazine survey as the least satisfying car in the United Kingdom, though 12,233 people bought a Galaxy in the previous year, which was twice the market share of its nearest rival, according to a company spokesman. In the UK, Ford Galaxy sold more than Volkswagen Sharan and was the best selling MPV.

=== Trims and facelifts ===
When the car was launched in 1995, there were two trim levels; the Aspen and the GLX, as well as the Ghia which launched a few months later. In 1996, the 4x4 powertrain was available, the Aspen was updated with body coloured bumpers and updated hubcaps, as well as the launch of the Ghia X which was powered by the 2.3 petrol as standard instead of the 2.0 like that on the standard Ghia - and it had a few more standard features like air conditioning and front fog lights. In early 1997, the Ultima was also launched, designed to be more luxurious than the Ghia. It had 6 leather captains chairs, as well as a front passenger airbag, traction control and different alloy wheels (all as standard features). However, it never sold very well and approximately only around 125 were on the road at its peak. Then, in 1999, Ford introduced the new LX and Zetec trim styles which replaced the Aspen and GLX models.

In August 2000, the Galaxy received a facelift with new exterior (incorporating New Edge) and interior styling including a new dashboard. The updated trims included the LX, the Zetec and Ghia. Contrary to the name, the Zetec was not available with a Zetec engine, but with the 1.9 TDI engine which was supplied by Volkswagen, as well as Ford's own 2.3 petrol. In 2004, the Galaxy received a very minor facelift with new taillights, a new lower front grille and a few differences to some trims. As well as this, the Silver special edition was launched alongside the Mondeo Silver, both having alloy wheels and only being available in 3 different silver colours.

Pre-facelift (1995–2000)	Facelift (2000–2006)
Aspen	LX
LX (1999)	Silver
GLX	Zetec
Zetec (1999)	Ghia
Si	
Ghia	
Ghia X	
Ultima	

=== Gallery ===
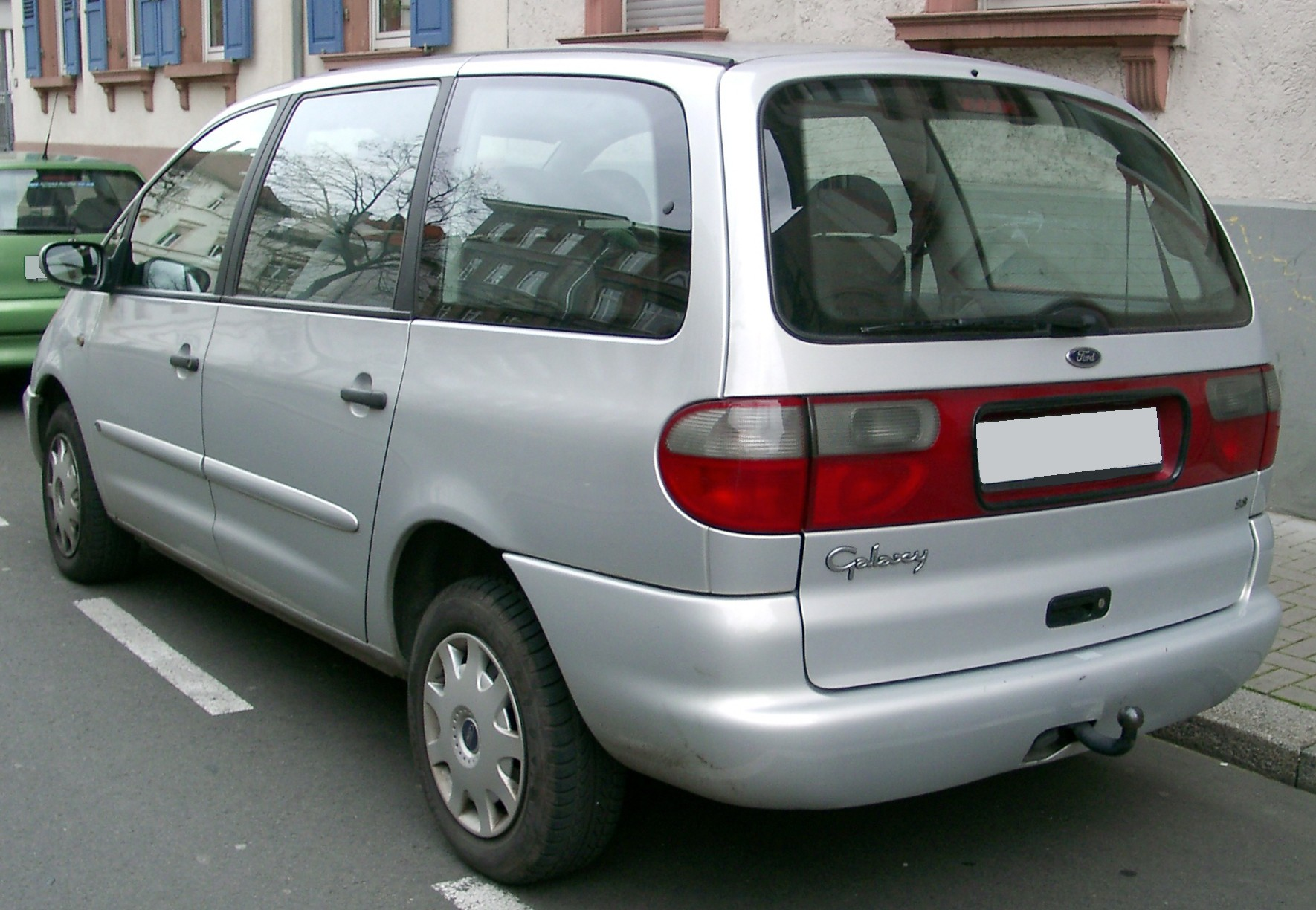
Galaxy Mk I (1995−2000)

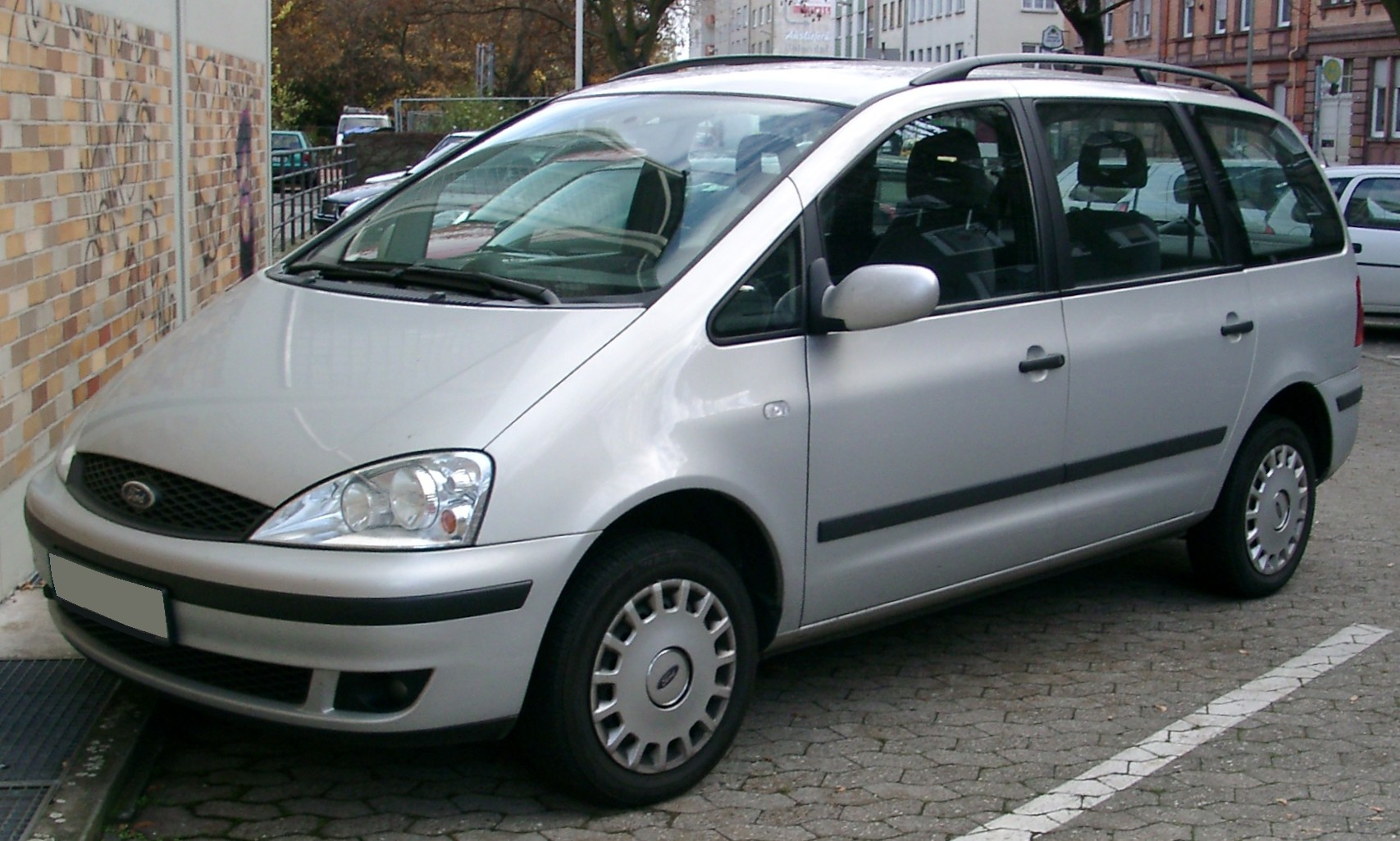
Galaxy Mk II (2000−2004)

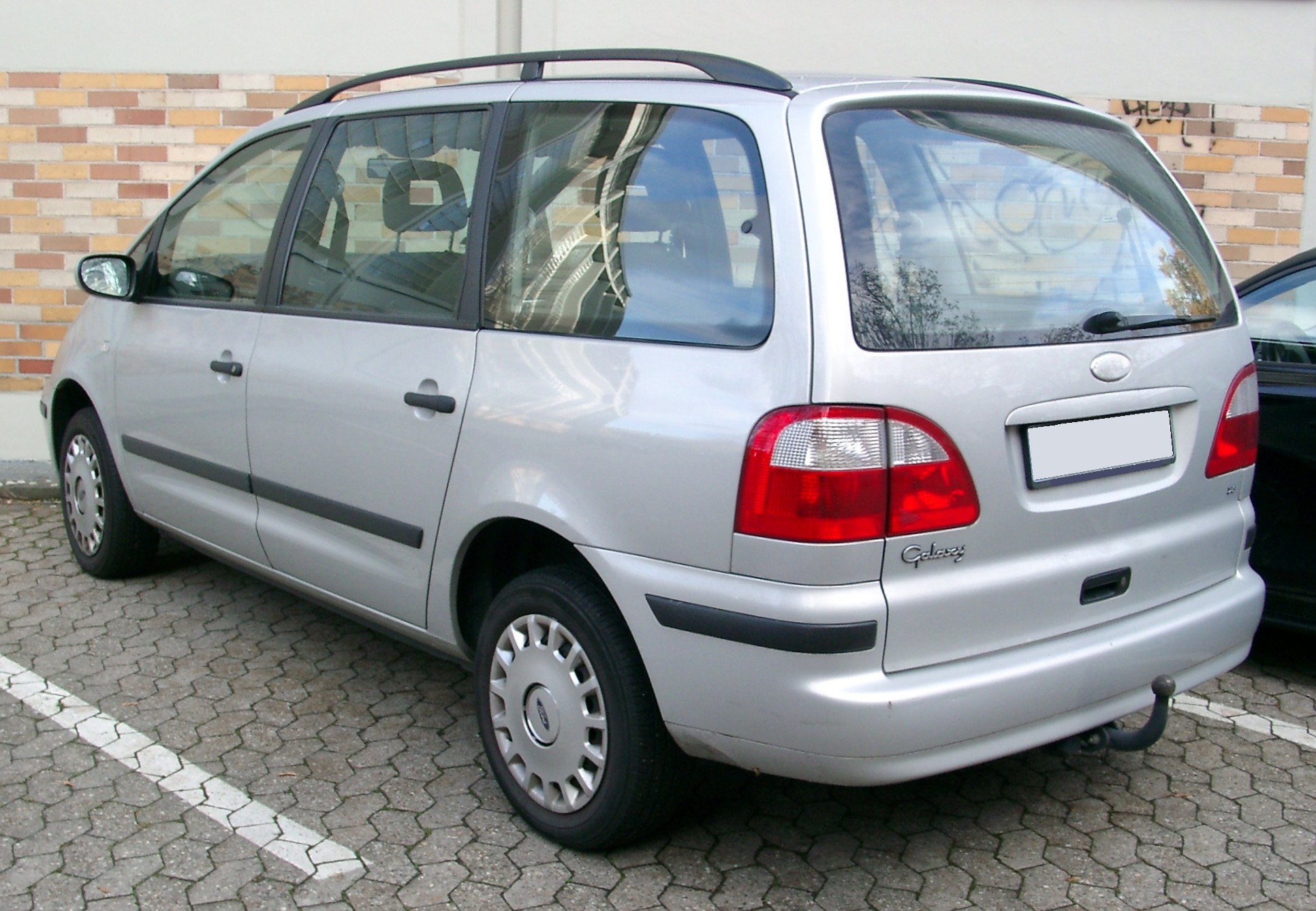
Galaxy Mk II (2000−2004)

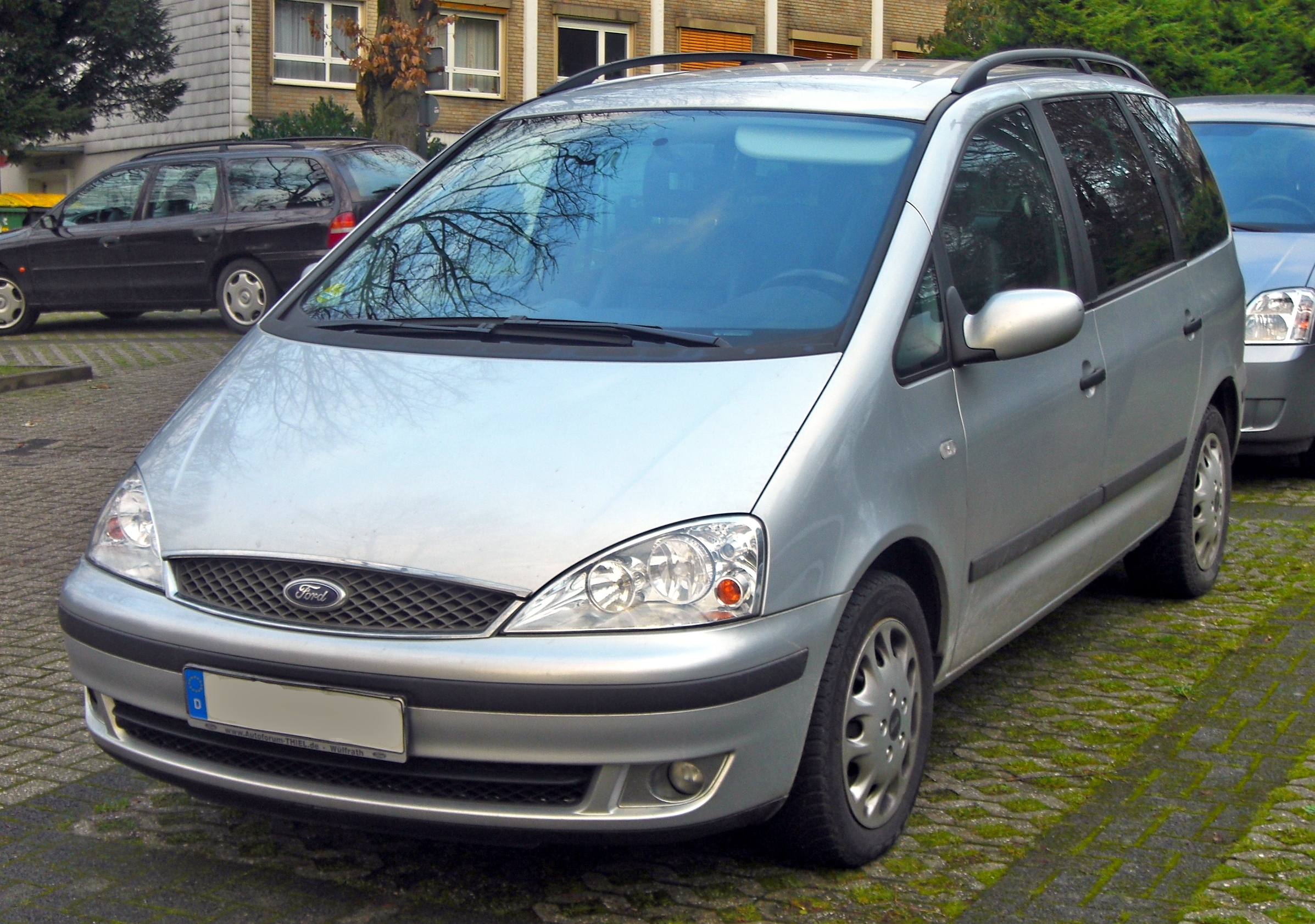
Galaxy Mk II (2004–2006)

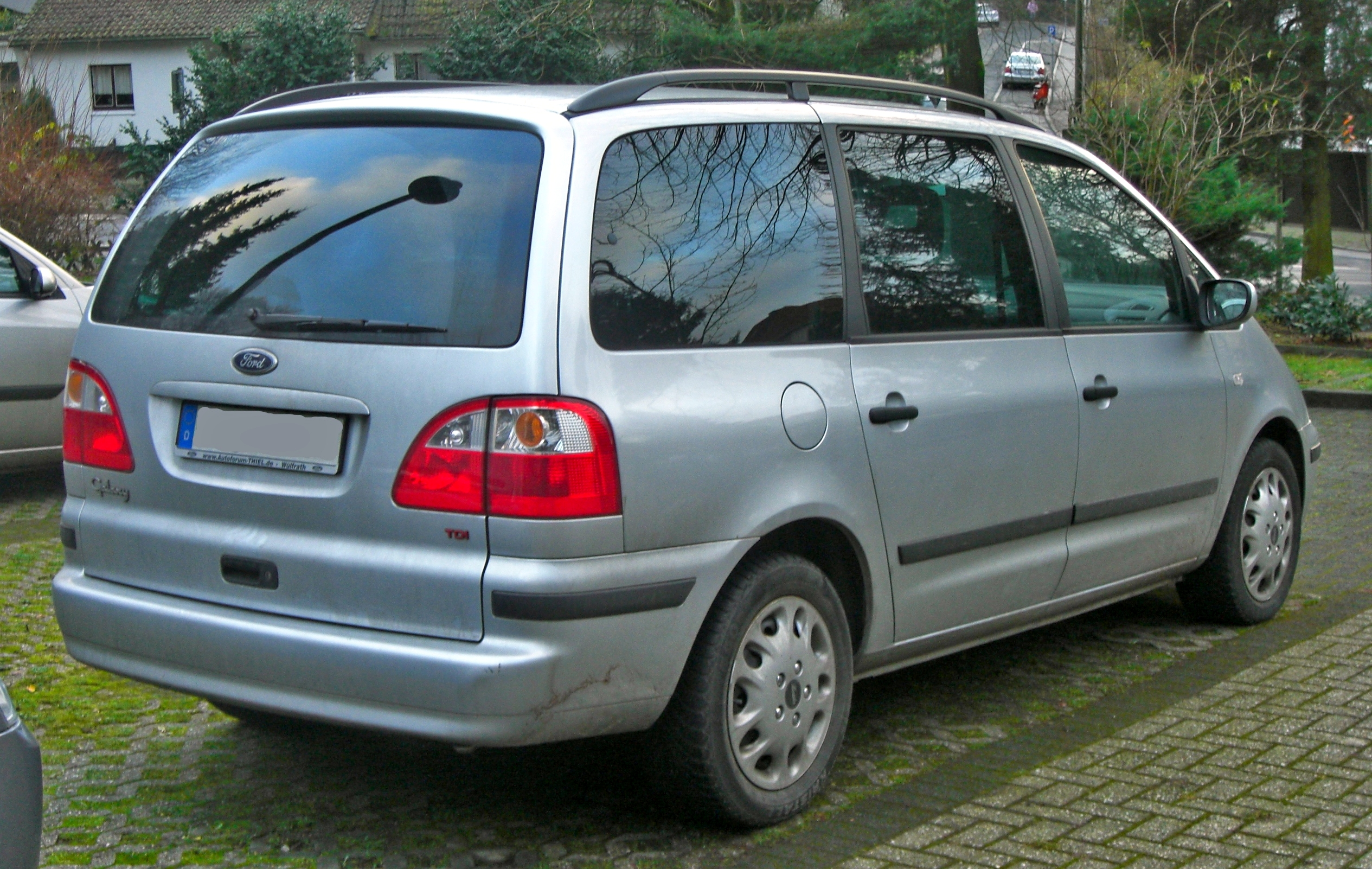
Galaxy Mk II (2004–2006)

== Second generation (2006) ==
Second generation (Mk III)
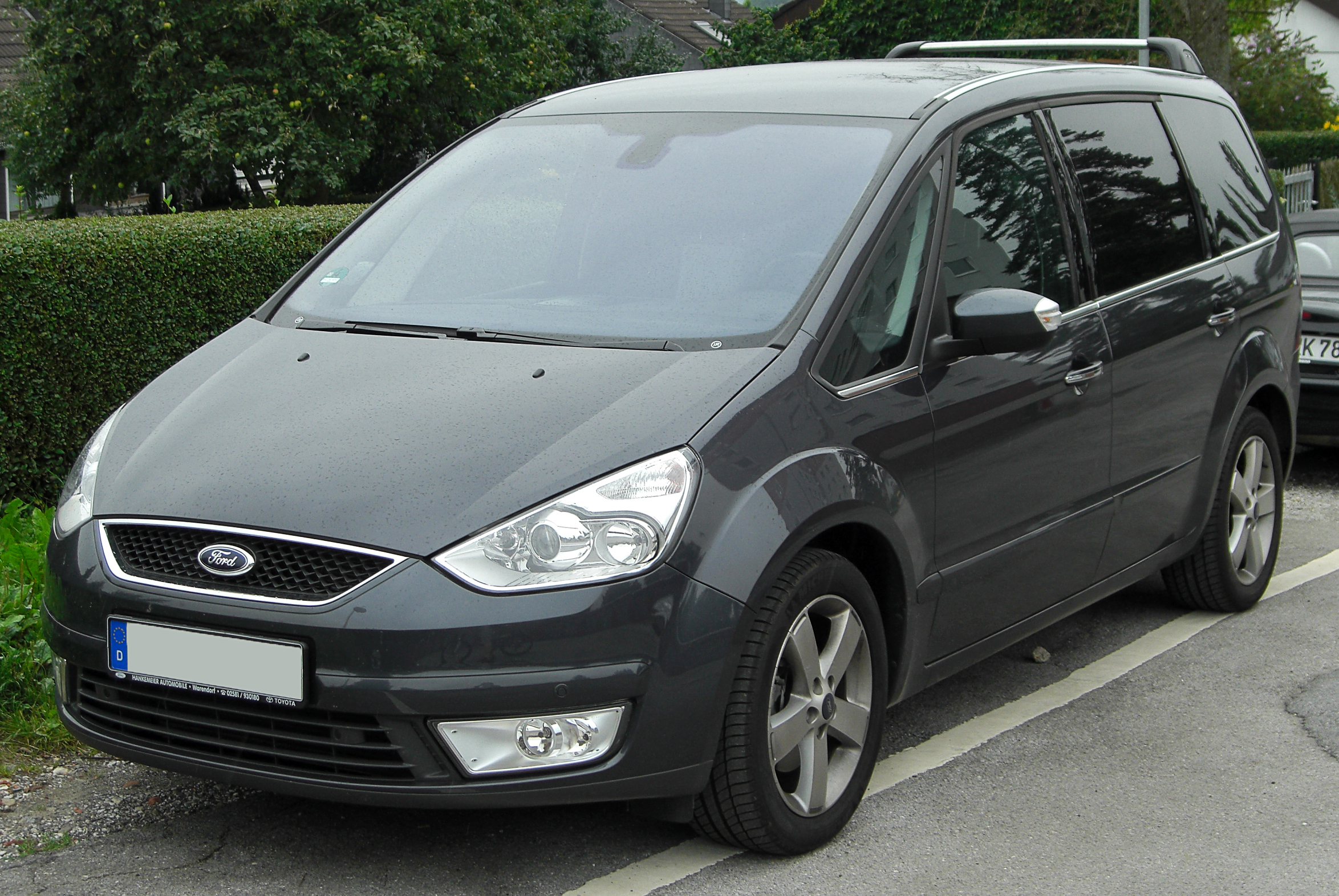
- Pre-facelift (2006−2010)

Overview
- Production: May 2006 − 2015
- Assembly: Belgium: Genk (GB&A); Russia: Elabuga (Ford-Sollers)

Body and chassis
- Related: Ford S-MAX; Ford Mondeo

Powertrain
- Engine: Petrol: 1.6 L EcoBoost turbo I4; 2.0 L Duratec I4; 2.0 L EcoBoost turbo I4; 2.3 L Duratec I4; Flexifuel: 2.0 L Duratec I4; Diesel: 1.8 L Duratorq TDCi I4; 2.0 L Duratorq TDCi I4; 2.2 L Duratorq TDCi I4
- Transmission: 6-speed manual 6-speed 6F35 automatic 6-speed 6DCT450 dual-clutch

Dimensions
- Wheelbase: 2,850 mm (112.2 in)
- Length: 4,820 mm (189.8 in)
- Width: 1,885 mm (74.2 in); Bojanan Version: 2007–2011: 1,925 mm (75.8 in); 2011-2015: 1,930 mm (76.0 in)
- Height: 1,725 mm (67.9 in)
- Kerb weight: 1,697–1,841 kg (3,741–4,059 lb); Bojanan Version: 1,774–1,908 kg (3,911–4,206 lb)

The second generation Galaxy was introduced at the 2006 Geneva Motor Show, and went on sale alongside the Ford S-Max (which had a lower rear roofline, external cosmetic differences and only child seats in the third row) in May 2006.

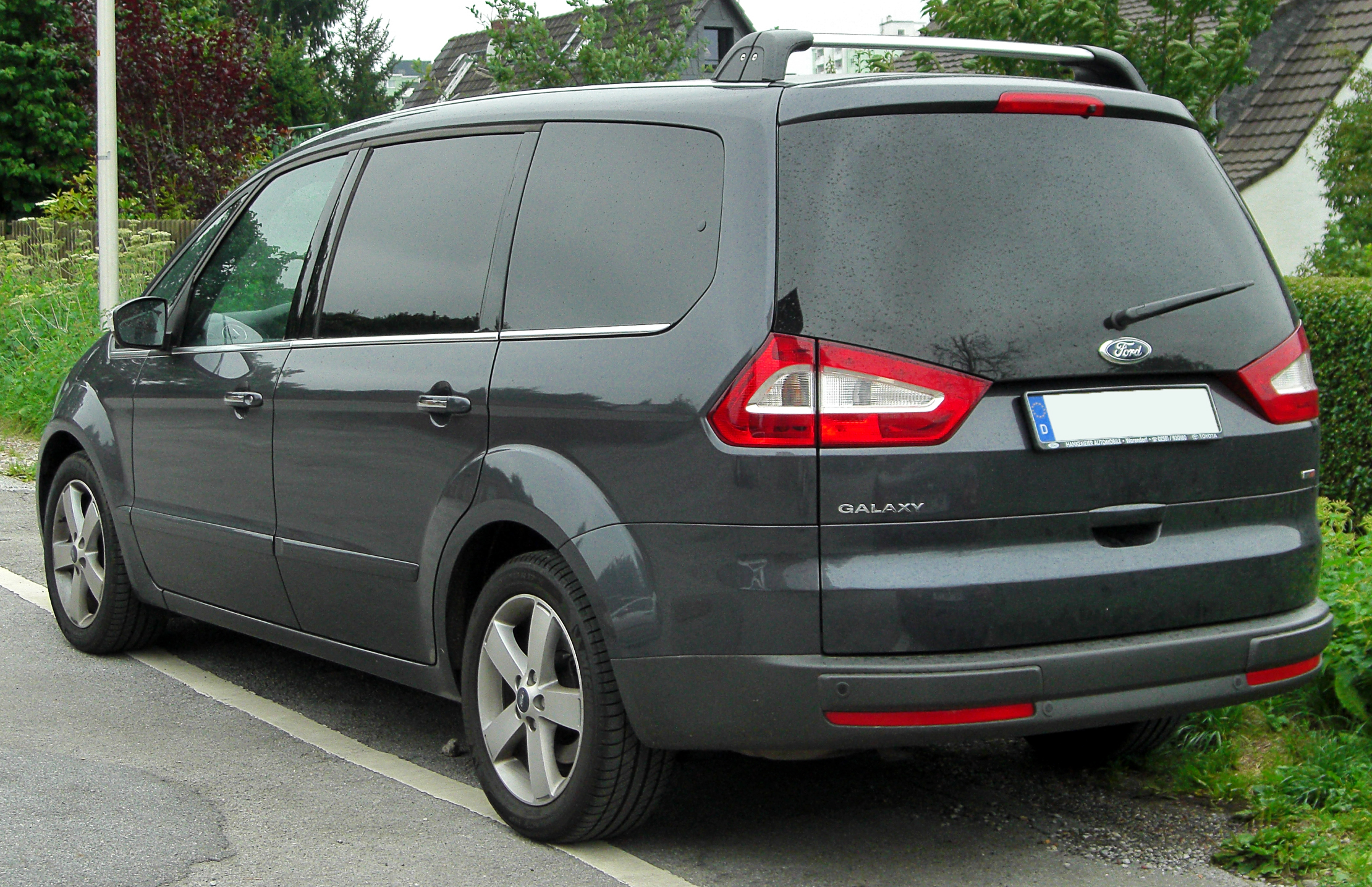
Pre-facelift (2006−2010)

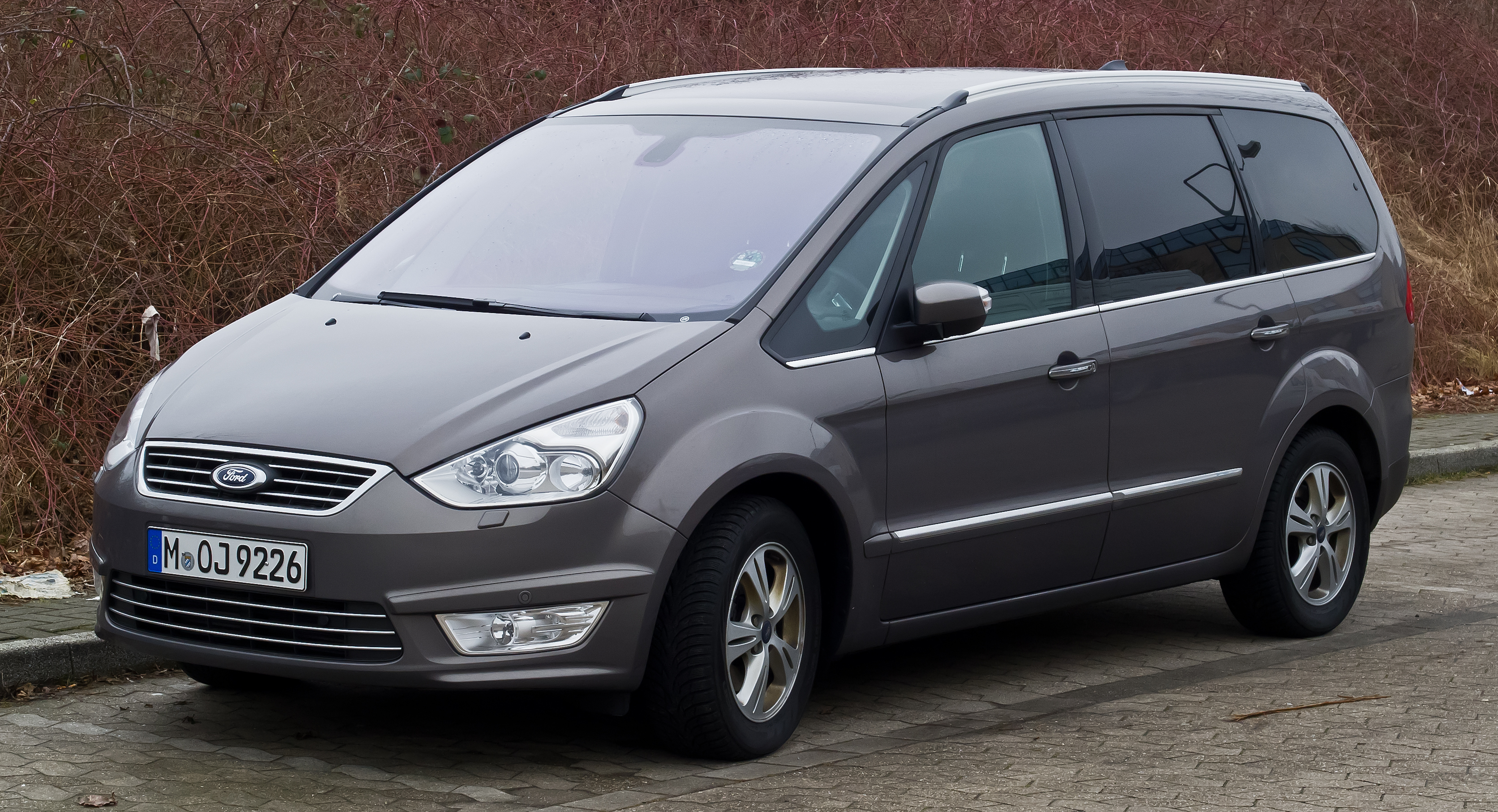

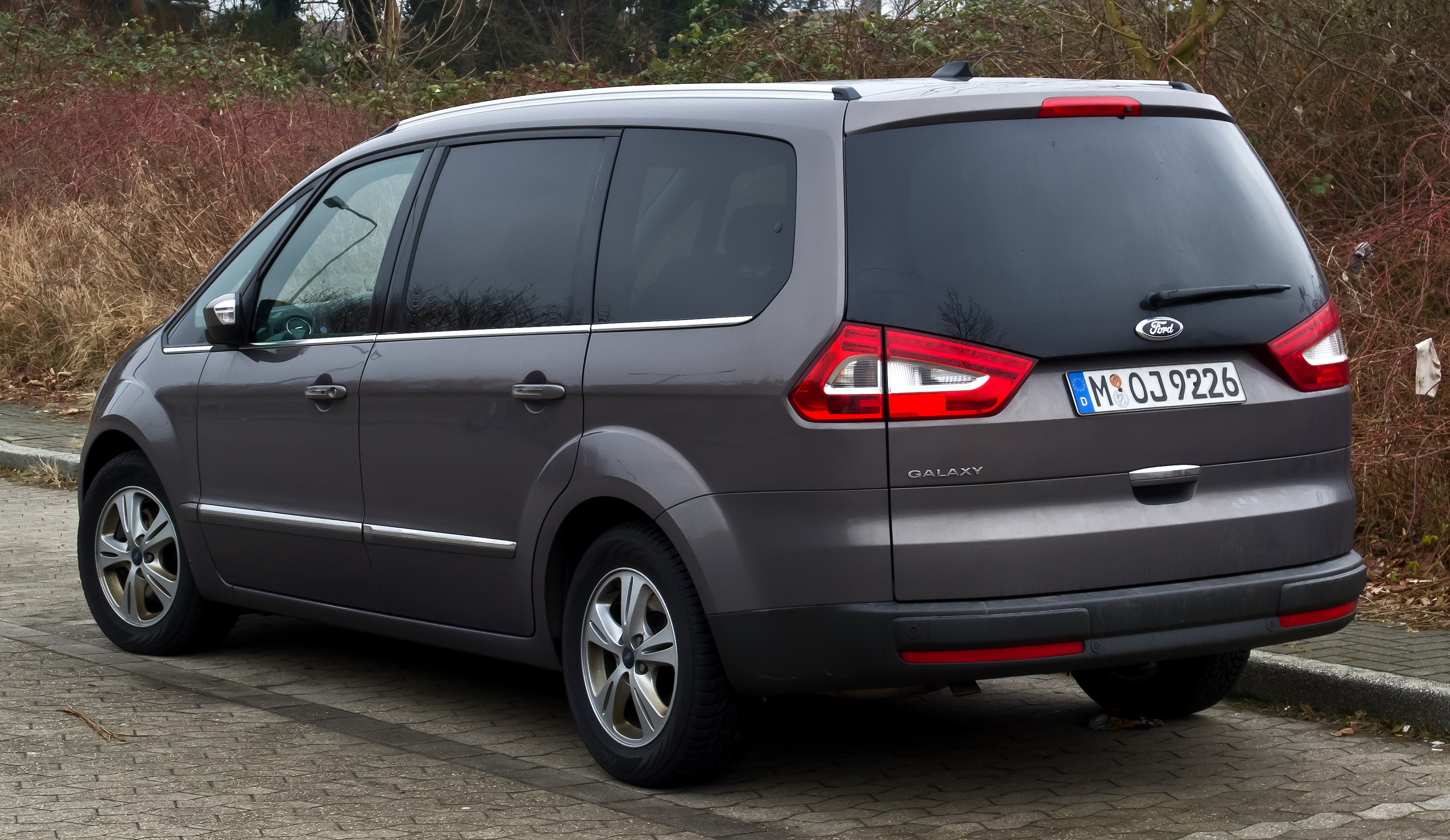
Facelift (2010−2015)

The new Galaxy is larger than its predecessor, and is a four pillar vehicle of Ford design, with no Volkswagen Group content (Ford sold its stake in AutoEuropa back to the Volkswagen Group the year before). No longer produced at the AutoEuropa plant in Portugal, Europe's replacement Galaxy is assembled at a newly re equipped plant alongside the Mondeo in Genk, Belgium. With the S-Max catering to customers who require a sport-oriented multi-purpose vehicle (MPV), Ford was able to expand the Galaxy in every dimension without losing sales in size conscious Europe.

Due to its size, Ford was unable to design the Galaxy using a full Kinetic Design format. However, Ford states that the Mk III Galaxy has 'elements' of Kinetic Design, such as its trapezoidal grille, large wheelarches and angular headlights. The vehicle has no spare wheel; instead an aerosol foam sealant is provided to seal punctures until a new tyre can be purchased.

Only Ford's own engines are used, all diesels being from the Duratorq family of engines in 100 PS (74 kW; 99 bhp) and 125 PS (92 kW; 123 bhp) 1.8-litre format, and also 130 PS (96 kW; 128 bhp) and 140 PS (103 kW; 138 bhp) 2.0 TDCi versions, with 2.2 TDCi for more power. Two petrol engines are now offered, there is the "1.6T 160PS EcoBoost Start/Stop" and the "2.0 203 PS EcoBoost

However the 1.6-litre Ecoboost engine has been criticized by the Independent writer Jamie Merrill. He describes the engine as not powerful enough and should have been left in the smaller cars.

In the United Kingdom, the Mk III Galaxy was available in Edge, Zetec, and Ghia trim levels. In February 2008, Ford added the Titanium high level trim in common with the Focus, C-MAX, Kuga, Mondeo and S-MAX ranges. The Titanium model is specified to the same level as the Ghia but adds a 'techno' feel. At the same time, the availability of a 175 PS (129 kW; 173 bhp) 2.2 TDCi engine option (joint design with PSA) was announced. The current trim levels available in the United Kingdom (November 2011) are Zetec, Titanium and Titanium X.

The Ford Galaxy also comes with many features such as Home Safe Lighting, Quickclear heated windscreen and a cooled passenger glove box.

One major selling point of the Galaxy and S-MAX is the "FoldFlatSystem". This design allows the second and third row seats to fold flat into the floor, although this change in seating design reduces the load carrying capacity of the vehicle.

This model of car is known as the main vehicle on the British television series Outnumbered, which replaces the Vauxhall Zafira the family had in the older series.

== Third generation (CD390; 2015) ==
Third generation (Mk IV)
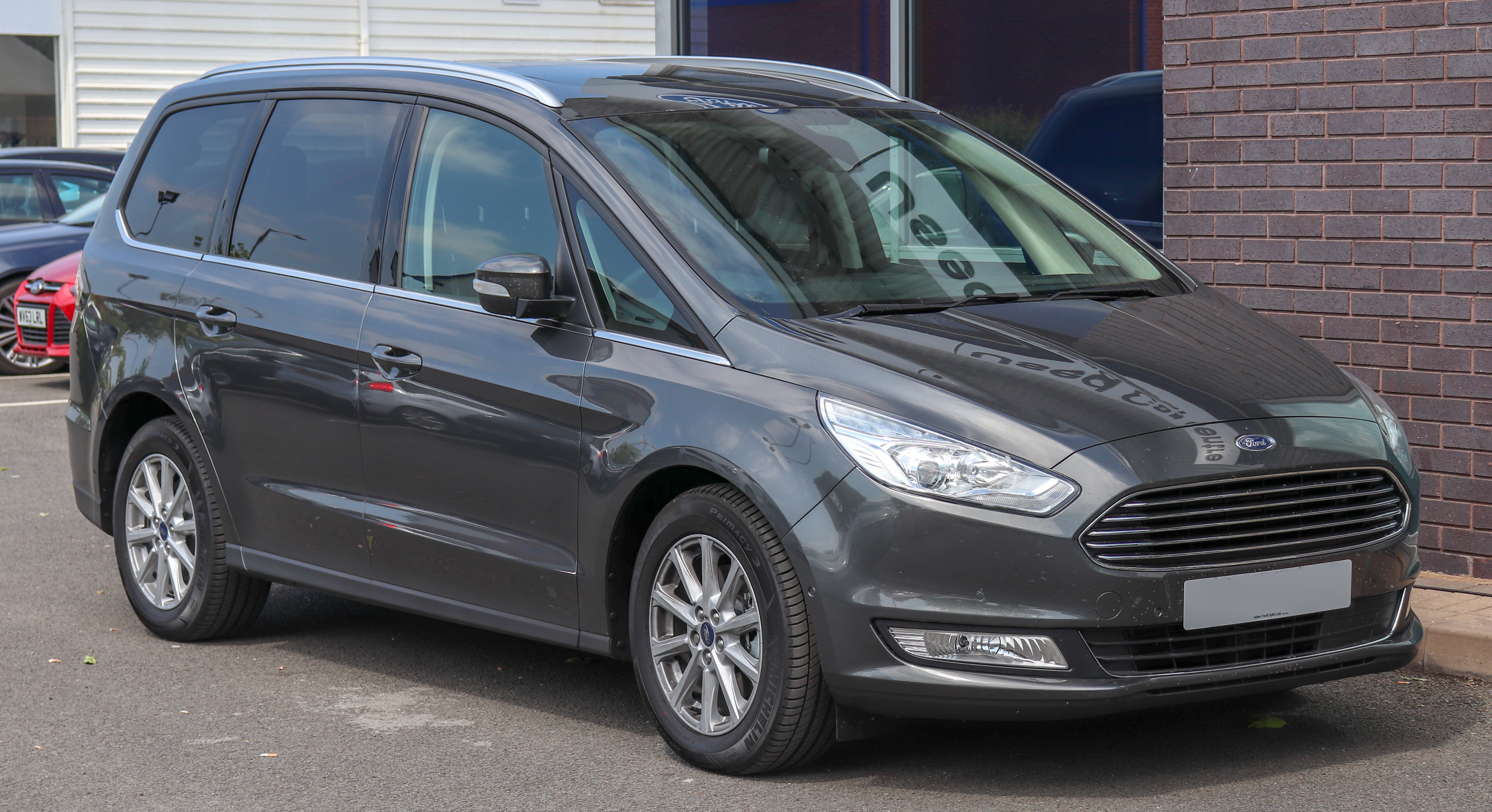
- Pre-facelift (2015−2020)

Overview
- Production: June 2015 – April 2023
- Assembly: Spain: Almussafes (Ford Valencia Plant)

Body and chassis
- Platform: Ford CD4 platform
- Related: Ford S-Max (second generation); Ford Edge (second generation); Lincoln MKZ (second generation); Lincoln Nautilus (first generation); Ford Mondeo (fourth generation)

Powertrain
- Engine: Petrol: 1.5 L EcoBoost turbo I4; 2.0 L EcoBoost turbo I4; Petrol hybrid: 2.5 L Duratec I4; Diesel: 2.0 L Duratorq TDCi I4; 2.0 L EcoBlue TDCi I4; 2.0 L EcoBlue twin-turbo I4
- Electric motor: 133 PS (98 kW; 131 hp) Permanent magnet 3-phase AC synchronous traction motor
- Transmission: 6-speed manual 6-speed 6F35 automatic Durashift CVT automatic 6-speed 6DCT450 dual-clutch
- Hybrid drivetrain: FHEV (Galaxy Hybrid)
- Battery: 1.1 kWh lithium-ion battery

Dimensions
- Wheelbase: 2,850 mm (112.2 in)
- Length: 4,853 mm (191.1 in)
- Width: 1,916 mm (75.4 in)
- Height: 1,811 mm (71.3 in)
- Curb weight: 1,978 kg (4,361 lb) (hybrid)

After its sibling, the Ford S-Max, was presented at the 2014 Paris Motor Show, the all-new Galaxy went on sale in mid-2015.

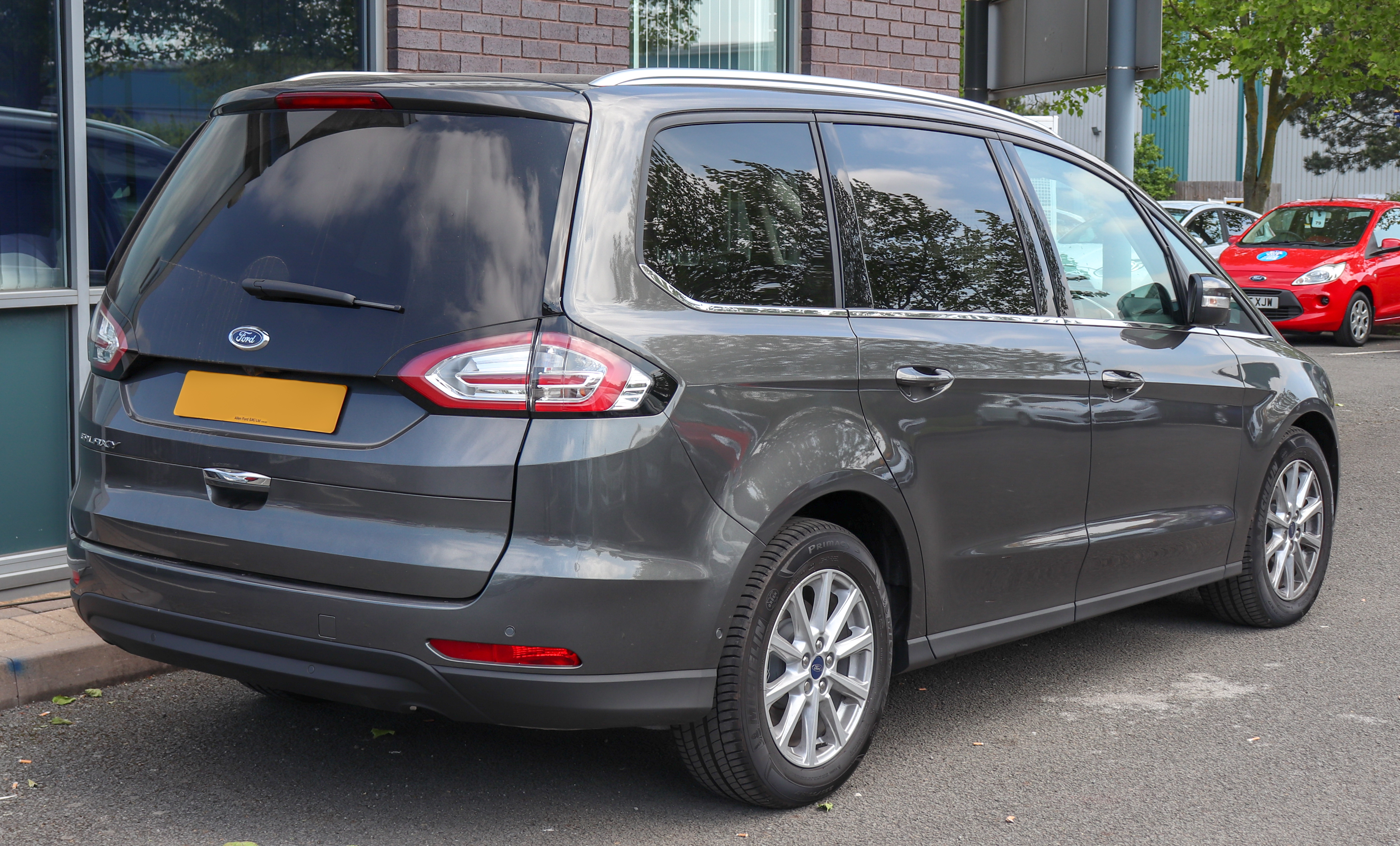
Pre-facelift (2015−2020)

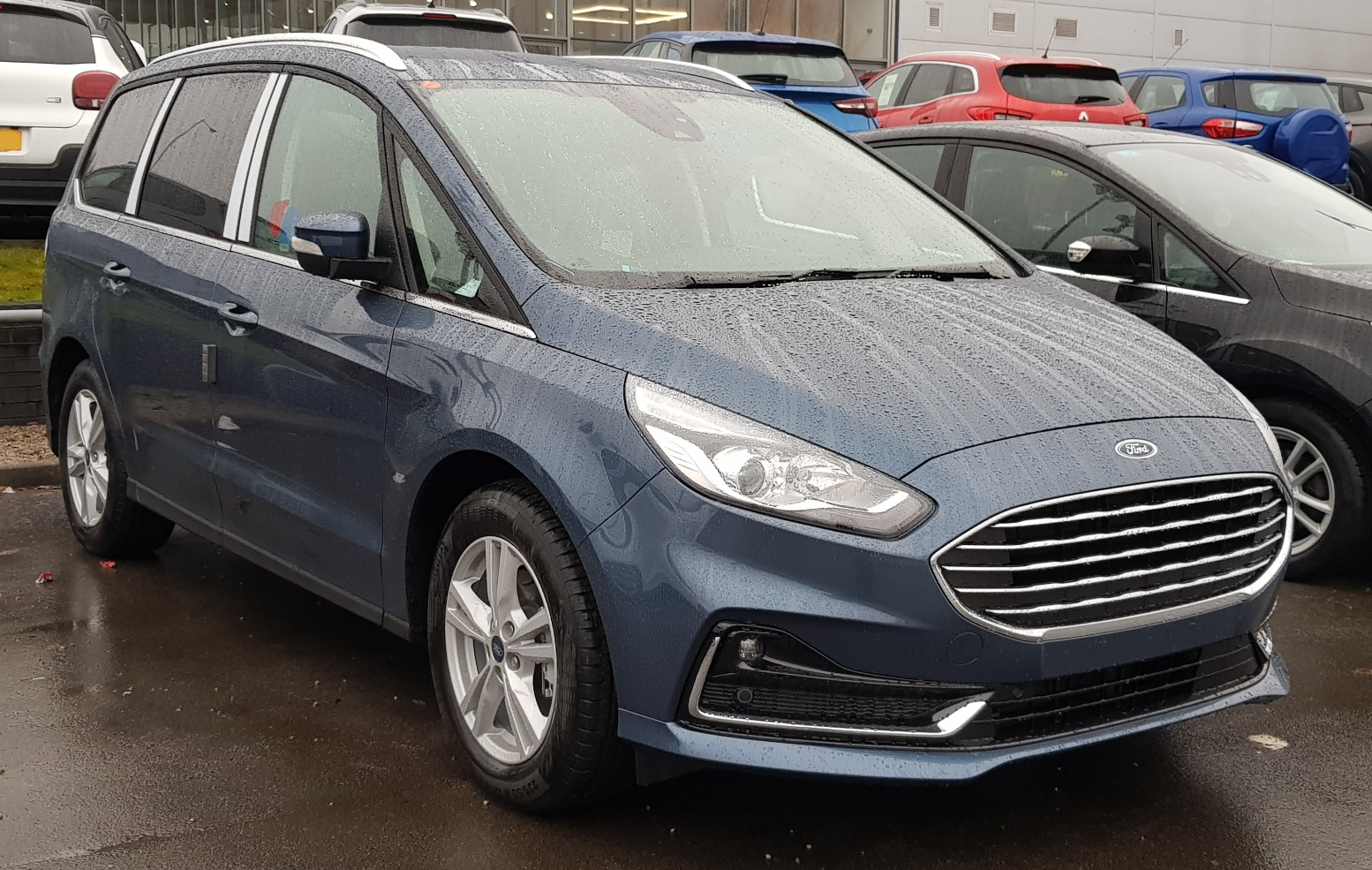

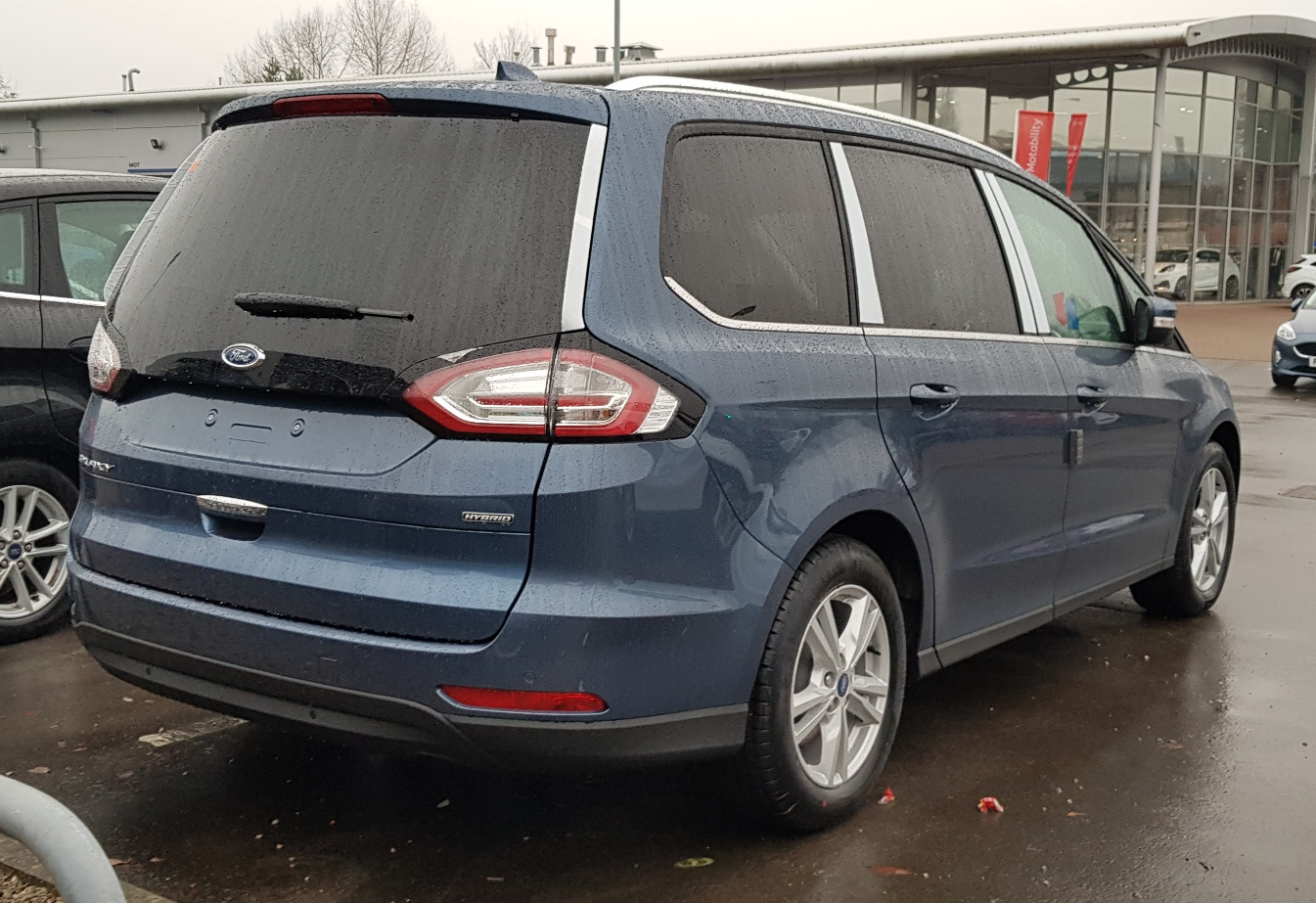
Facelift (2020–2023)

The Galaxy is available with the same range of engines as the S-Max, namely one diesel (in four states of tune) and two petrol variants. The petrol 1.5 SCTi Ecoboost has 160 hp, and the larger 2.0 SCTi has 240 hp, but can only be mated to Ford's Powershift automatic gearbox. At launch, Ford expected only two percent of United Kingdom sales to be petrol models.

All the diesels average over 50 mpg – the most economical being the 2.0 TDCi Duratorq 120, which manages 57mpg. Both the 2.0 TDCi 150 and 180 versions come with either a six-speed manual gearbox or the Powershift auto – the 180 hp version can also be specced with AWD. The range topping Bi-Turbo 2.0 TDCi 210 comes with the Powershift gearbox only, and can accelerate from 0 to 60 in under nine seconds.

The trim levels, mirroring those available in the S-Max, Mondeo and Edge, include Zetec, Titanium and Titanium X.

=== Mid-cycle facelift ===
Ford updated the Galaxy for the 2020 model year. It received a new front grille and bumpers with a similar design as the Mondeo, Focus, Fiesta, Puma and Kuga. The Galaxy also received the Vignale version, a new automatic transmission and an updated infotainment system with Apple CarPlay and Android Auto.

=== Hybrid update ===
In late 2021, Ford stopped selling the standard petrol and diesel models, only selling it with one engine choice, a 2.5-litre hybrid Duratec - producing 190PS with a Durashift CVT transmission.

=== Discontinuation ===
In January 2022, Ford announced plans to discontinue the Galaxy after 27 years of production, stopping accepting orders for the minivan in favour of realisation of existing ones. Afterwards the cars will be axed from the European lineup with a direct successor: the Ford Tourneo Courier.

== Reviews ==
The 2012 Ford Galaxy was reviewed by What Car?, and was given 4 out of 5 stars. They added that the Galaxy was more fun to drive than most MPVs.

Top Gear also reviewed the car and gave it 7/10 and added it looked great all around.
