= Panche =

Panche may refer to:

- Panche people, an indigenous group of people in what is now Colombia
- Panche language, unclassified language of the Panche people
- Panche, an item of men's traditional wear in Andhra Pradesh
- Panche Zhezhovski (died 2023), Macedonian murder victim

== See also ==
- Panche baja
- Panch (disambiguation)
- Pancha (disambiguation)
- Panchi (disambiguation)
