= Ponch =

Ponch may refer to:

- Posser, or ponch, a tool for hand laundry
- Ponch Hawkes (born 1946), Australian photographer
- Francis "Ponch" Poncherello, a character in the American TV series CHiPs

== See also ==
- Panch (disambiguation)
- Poncha (disambiguation)
- Ponche, a traditional Mexican Christmas punch
- Poncho, a garment
- Poonch (disambiguation)
