= Murders of Vanja Gjorchevska and Panche Zhezhovski =

2023 kidnapping and murder of two individuals from Skopje and Veles

- Location: Rudnik, Veles (Panche), Dupki, Skopje (Vanja)
- Date: 22 November, 2023 (Panche), 27 November, 2023 (Vanja)
- Attack type: Kidnapping, murder
- Weapon: 9 mm pistol
- Victims: Vanja Gjorchevska, Panche Zhezhovski
- Perpetrators: Ljupcho Palevski "Palcho", Bore Videvski, Velibor Manev, Vlatko Keshishеv
- Motive: Self-interest, extraction of ransom
- Litigation: Four suspects charged, convicted and sentenced to life imprisonment; Victim's father, Aleksandar, charged but acquitted
- Judge: Ivica Stefanovski (since 30 July, 2024)

On 3 December, 2023, the bodies of 14-year-old Vanja Gjorchevska and 74-year-old Panche Zhezhovski were discovered near the village of Brazda and in a wooded area near Veles, respectively. Four individuals—Ljupcho Palevski "Palcho", Bore Videvski, Velibor Manev, and Vlatko Keshishеv—were convicted and sentenced to life imprisonment for their roles in the murders. Vanja's father, Aleksandar Gjorchevski, was initially accused of assisting in her kidnapping but was later acquitted due to lack of evidence. The case prompted nationwide mourning and outrage, as well as the spread of conspiracy theories and misinformation surrounding the events.

The investigation by the Ministry of Internal Affairs concluded that both murders were carried out by the same individuals, motivated by "self-interest". It was determined that Gjorchevska was abducted in a white Citroën car that had been stolen five days earlier from Zhezhovski near her apartment. She was killed the same day, on 27 November, 2023, at approximately 10:00 AM.

The murder of Vanja was initially intended as a means to extract ransom from her mother, but the perpetrators killed her without attempting to collect ransom, being in a state of panic.

== Background ==
=== Vanja Gjorchevska ===
Vanja Gjorchevska was a 14-year-old student at "J.H. Pestaloci". She was born on 27 February, 2009, in Skopje to Zorica Gjorchevska and Aleksandar Gjorchevski, and had a sister named Minja. Her family had moved into a new apartment in Debar Maalo-City Center in September, 2023, two months before her kidnapping and murder. Her parents were divorced.

At the time of the kidnapping, according to the Ministry of Internal Affairs, she was 175 cm tall and weighed 58 kg. She had dark brown hair, brown eyes, wore braces, and had a mole on the right side of her face. She was last seen wearing a blue blouse, black jacket, black jeans, white shoes with brown stripes, a rucksack, and carrying a model of an iPhone.

=== Panche Zhezhovski ===
Panche Zhezhovski was a 74-year-old barber from Veles. He is described as nice and respected by members of the community. In one instance, he offered a girl in a vineyard a ride.

=== Perpetrators ===
==== Ljupcho Palevski "Palcho" ====
Palevski, born on 12 December, 1964, in Skopje, is considered the main perpetrator of the kidnapping and murder of Vanja and Panche. He is a former member of Social Democratic Union of Macedonia (SDSM), where he once was the president of the city organisation of the party in Skopje, one of the most influential positions in the city and the country.

He issued a weekly newspaper in Rachica, Tetovo, but it was quickly closed down. He later opened a new television channel named TV4, which was closed many years later due to unpaid obligations to the country.

Palevski was a regular guest at Infomax.mk, especially in the podcast "Tough conversations", and he also became the host and co-host of their podcasts.

Around December, 2022, his pro-Kremlin far-right political party, Desna, was registered in the Basic Civil Court, and on 5 January, 2023, his party was officially logged in the Central Registry. Along with him, the other founder of the party was Ljupcho Jovanovski. All of the other perpetrators are affiliated with Desna as well.

==== Bore Videvski ====
Bore Videvski was born in Veles. He is a father of two and has engaged in martial arts. He was against the change of the name of the Macedonian Orthodox Church.

==== Velibor Manev ====
Velibor Manev is born in Veles and is also a father of two. Together with Bore, he opposed the name change of the MOC.

==== Vlatko Keshishev ====
Vlatko Keshishev lived in Shtip. He was divorced according to those who knew him.

== Kidnappings ==
=== Kidnapping of Panche Zhezhovski ===
On 22 November 2023 at around 9 AM, Panche Zhezhovski was abducted by Bore Videvski, Velibor Manev, and Vlatko Keshishеv in Veles with the goal of stealing his white Citroën. The perpetrators entered his home, physically overpowered him, tied him up, and placed him in the trunk of his car.

They transported Zhezhovski to an area called Rudnik, located on the outskirts of Veles, where they executed him with a 9 mm pistol on the same day. It is believed the execution was due to Panche owing Ljupche €500.

His disappearance was reported by family members on 24 November, after they noticed his front door was locked from the outside, the heater was on, and personal items including his ID and bank card were missing.

The perpetrators then drove to Skopje intending to abduct Vanja. The kidnapping was initially planned for Friday, 24 November, as Vanja typically walked to school alone on Fridays. However, it was postponed to Monday, 27 November, due to traffic delays. The perpetrators were aware that on that day, Vanja would be alone again, as her sister had received a message instructing her to go to school from the second class. Only her father, Aleksandar, was informed of the message.

=== Kidnapping of Vanja Gjorchevska ===
On 27 November, at approximately 7:27 AM, Vanja left her apartment on Naum Naumovski Borce Street to go to school.

Velibor Manev, armed with a screwdriver, opened the front door of the apartment, and he and Bore Videvski were waiting inside with a sleeping bag, while Vlatko Keshishеv remained in the vehicle as a lookout. Vanja exited the elevator, where Bore grabbed her by the waist and Velibor seized her leg, placing duct tape over her mouth to prevent her from screaming, tying her legs and feet with plastic zip ties, and putting her in the sleeping bag. Before placing her in the trunk of the car and driving away, they destroyed her phone to prevent it from being tracked.

Approximately 15 minutes after her kidnapping, the kidnappers met Ljupcho Palevski "Palcho", who was driving a Renault Kangoo, at an overpass in Vizbegovo. In video camera footage from the platz "Metal burg" in Vizbegovo, there can be seen the Renault Kangoo driving, and then 8 seconds later there appears the Citroën following the Renault Kangoo.

At approximately 10:00 AM, they stopped at a secluded location in Dupki, near Brazda. Reportedly being in a state of panic, the kidnappers fatally shot Vanja in the head with a 9 mm pistol, using a pillow to muffle the sound. They then buried her body in a 0.918 m^{3} grave and burned the Citroën.

== Investigation ==
=== Initial investigation ===
On 27 November, at around 8:35 AM, Vanja's mother, Zorica Gjorchevska, called 112 and reported Vanja missing. Her father, Aleksandar Gjorchevski, officially reported to the Police for the second time at around 11:00 AM. At 12:09 PM, Zorica posted an appeal for help on Facebook.

Following the report, police launched an immediate investigation. An Operational Headquarters was established at SVR Skopje. Investigators collected CCTV footage, confiscated digital devices and vehicles, conducted interviews with people, and carried out door-to-door searches in the SVR Skopje, SVR Veles, and SVR Shtip regions with the help of several hundred officers.

On December 3, 2023, the bodies of Vanja and Panche were found near the village of Brazda and a wooded area near Veles, respectively. In a press conference, Minister of Internal Affairs, Oliver Spasovski, and head of the Public Prosecutor's Office in Skopje, Gavril Buvevski, in a press conference emphasized the kidnapping was not random, but "targeted with lucrative motives", meaning she was kidnapped for ransom.

An autopsy later on revealed that Vanja died from a gunshot wound passing through the neck and fourth vertebra, with a wound also identified in the right hemisphere of the brain.

=== Arrest of accused perperators ===
On December 4, 2023, an international arrest warrant was issued for Ljupcho Palevski "Palcho". To escape, one driver, with a Škoda Superb, drove Palevski to Belgrade and left him in a hotel, and another with a Range Rover jeep from Belgrade through Bulgaria to Turkey. He was apprehended by the Turkish police on December 5 in Balıkesir while walking along a highway.

In the following months, additional suspects, including Velibor Manev, Vlatko Keshishеv, and Bore Videvski, were identified and taken into custody in Skopje. Vanja's father, Aleksandar Gjorchevski, was detained on suspicion of assisting in the kidnapping, but his detention was revoked on April 25, 2024 and he was placed under house arrest. He was acquitted by the Skopje Criminal Court on June 25, 2025.

On 21 June, 2025, the prosecution requested an investigation into a member of the Desna party for allegedly helping to conceal evidence related to the murders, specifically, for removing a blue rucksack containing the pistol used to kill Vanja and Panche from the party offices.

== Legal proceedings ==
=== Arrest and extradition of Ljupcho Palevski "Palcho" ===
The first arrest was that of Ljupcho Palevski "Palcho". While in Turkish custody, the Ministry of Justice of North Macedonia received official notification from Interpol on December 5, 2023, regarding his arrest. Justice Minister Krenar Loga immediately signed an extradition request, and the Ministry requested that Turkish authorities keep Palevski in detention until the extradition process was completed. On December 11, the Turkish Ministry of Foreign Affairs informed Macedonian authorities that Palevski had been placed under a 40-day extradition detention. By April 30, 2024, Turkey officially approved Palevski's extradition.

=== Further legal processes ===
In May 2024, the Public Prosecutor's Office in Skopje filed an indictment against four individuals: Velibor Manev, Vlatko Keshishеv, Bore Videvski, and Aleksandar Gjorchevski. A separate indictment was issued for Ljupcho Palevski following his extradition.

On July 8, 2024, the Skopje Criminal Court dismissed defense appeals and upheld the indictments in full. On this date, Judge Ivica Stefanovski was assigned to a court hearing date on 30 July through the ACCMIS and would preside over this case.

On September 4, 2024, the Criminal Court unified the separate cases into one consolidated trial, scheduled for September 20.

At the trial on September 20, all five main defendants pleaded not guilty before the Skopje Criminal Court.

Over 35 public court sessions were held, during which evidence was presented by both the prosecution and the defense, with the prosecution presenting video recordings, electronic communications and items collected from the crime scene, and Palevski claiming that the trial was politically rigged.

=== "Swedish boyfriend" theory ===
During court proceedings, investigators followed a lead provided by Vanja's parents involving an alleged online Swedish “virtual boyfriend” believed to have kidnapped her. The suspect's online activity included ISIS-linked imagery. Swedish authorities cooperated with Macedonian ones and conducted border checks and phone confiscations, but no evidence of kidnapping by an online "virtual boyfriend" was found.

=== Velibor Manev's theory ===
A theory by defendant Velibor Manev was shared, where he supposed that the perpetrators kidnapped the wrong person, intending to kidnap a woman aged 38 to 40 years old and hold her for ransom to help fund the Desna political party. He said that they intended to lower Panche into a previously dug 4-meter hole and chain him to a concrete pillar, use his car to kidnap the previously mentioned woman, and after she was kidnapped, Panche would be let to use his car again and replace his place in the hole with the kidnapped woman.

=== Final sentencing ===
On June 25, 2025, the Skopje Criminal Court sentenced Palevski, Manev, Videvski, and Keshishеv to 10 years in prison for the kidnapping of Vanja and Panche, to be served concurrently with life imprisonment for their murders. Vanja's father, Aleksandar Gjorchevski, was acquitted due to insufficient evidence of his involvement in the case.

== Aftermath ==
The aftermath of the kidnappings of Vanja and Panche was one filled with mourning, grief and public outrage.

Residents of North Macedonia posted black ribbons on social media to show their mourning and sympathy.

A day after Vanja's disappearance, her friends put up posters of her in Debar Maalo, where she had lived.

On 5 December, 2023, students, parents, and teachers holding flowers signed the Book of Mourning for Vanja in her own school, "Johan Heinrich Pestaloci" in Kender Municipality. On a table in front of the school entrance was a picture of Vanja covered with a black ribbon. The then-President of North Macedonia Stevo Pendarovski also signed the Book of Mourning. Meanwhile, the Minister of Foreign Affairs at the time, Bujar Osmani, expressed his condolences for the family.

Demands for a child-alert system (akin to the Amber Alert system in the United States) in North Macedonia started spreading. Currently, North Macedonia has a system for finding missing children in the form of a "Find me" website.

During a press conference, then-Minister of Internal Affairs, Oliver Spasovski, has called the murderers "Lunatics, monsters, people that cannot be called people."

== Misinformation and conspiracy theories ==
Numerous conspiracy theories and misinformation have circulated regarding the case.

Soon after Vanja's disappearance, fake profiles started to spread disinformation about supposed knowledge of the kidnappers, Vanja's fate and AI-generated images.

One theory alleges that Ljupcho Palevski was framed because of his alleged anti-Western and pro-Russian stance, being the leader of a far-right party called Desna. This theory was propagated by a social media group named "Justice for Palco".

A conspiracy theory shared by a user on X claimed that Panche was murdered not over debt, but because he allegedly possessed maps dating back to the Ottoman Empire era, which revealed hidden gold locations.

A claim on Facebook suggested that Vanja was the victim of a satanic ritual and that "Palcho" was framed by demons. Investigative bodies dismissed this theory as disinformation.

A post by a Facebook account "Makedonka Mak Makedonska" falsely claimed that the mother of Vanja, Zorica, reported her daughter's absence one hour and 12 minutes before her daughter actually went missing and that the Facebook profile of Zorica was a fake account. Zorica actually reported Vanja missing at 8:35 AM, about one hour after Vanja's disappearance.

A post on Facebook falsely claimed that a world network of pedophilic Western elites (referring to the participants of the OSCE Summit in Skopje) came to the country, kidnapped Vanja, and covered up her death so that they could not be discovered. This is a part of a conspiracy theory that claims Western elites kidnap children to make themselves look younger using adrenochrome. This couldn't be possible because the OSCE Summit happened on 29 November, two days after her kidnapping. The post also claims eyewitness evidence supports the theory, but no evidence from supposed eyewitnesses has been presented yet.

A disinformation campaign falsely claimed that the perpetrators were of non-Macedonian ethnicity, a claim the Ministry of Internal Affairs and the Basic Public Prosecutor's Office refuted, confirming that all of the perpetrators were ethnic Macedonians.

== See also ==
- List of kidnappings
- Belgrade school shooting
- Death of Danka Ilić
