= Ponca (disambiguation) =

The Ponca are a Native American tribe.

Ponca may also refer to:

== Native Americans ==
- Ponca Tribe of Nebraska
- Ponca Tribe of Indians of Oklahoma

== Places in the United States ==
=== Arkansas ===
- Ponca, Arkansas, an unincorporated community

=== Nebraska ===
- Ponca, Nebraska, county seat of Dixon County
- Ponca Creek (Missouri River), a creek in South Dakota and Nebraska
- Ponca Fort (c. 1700-c. 1865), a Native American fortified village
- Ponca Reservation, an Indian reservation in north-east Nebraska
- Ponca State Park
- Ponca Township, Dixon County, Nebraska

=== Oklahoma ===
- Ponca City, Oklahoma

== Other uses ==
- Ponca City Baseball team, Oklahoma
- Ponca City High School, Oklahoma
- Ponca City Public Schools, a public school district
- Ponca City Regional Airport (PNC), an airport in Oklahoma
- Ponca Jazz Records, a Norwegian record label founded in 2004
- Ponca (cricket), a genus of cricket

== See also ==
- Omaha–Ponca language, a Siouan language
- Poncan Theatre, a theatre in Ponca City
- Poncha (disambiguation)
