= Eurocar =

Official manufacturer of Škoda cars in Ukraine

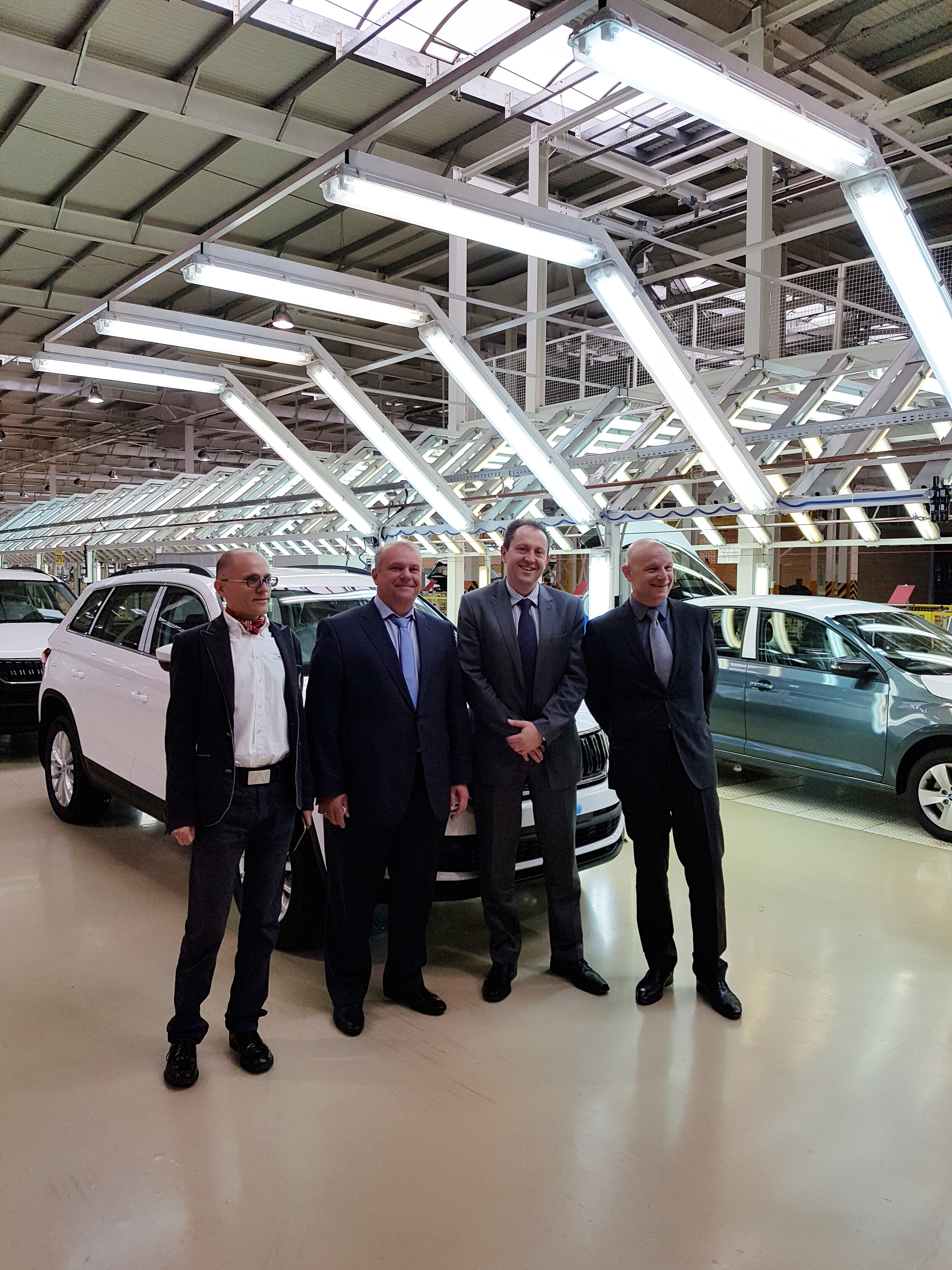
- Eurocar factory in Solomonovo
- Company type: Automotive manufacturer
- Industry: Automotive industry
- Founded: 14 April 2000; 26 years ago
- Headquarters: Kyiv
- Area served: Ukraine
- Website: https://www.skoda-auto.ua/company/skoda-solomonovo

Eurocar PrJSC is the official manufacturer of Škoda cars in Ukraine, owned by Atoll Holding. It is one of the largest passenger car manufacturers in Ukraine. The plant's share in the total production of passenger vehicles in 2020 comprised 81%. The plant's production capacity amounts to 80 thousand cars per year (SKD assembly – 30 thousand cars, CKD production – 50 thousand cars per year) with the potential for further capacity expansion. The production site has a railway terminal capable of transporting to the EU and CIS countries.

The Eurocar plant is located in the village of Solomonovo, Uzhhorod Raion, Zakarpattia Oblast of Ukraine, at a distance of 1.5 km from the border with Hungary and 2 km from the border with Slovakia.

== Plant history ==
Production facilities construction started on 23 July 2001. The technical launch of the plant took place on 19 December of the same year and in April 2002, the mass production of Škoda Octavia cars has followed. In August 2002, the first Škoda Fabia car rolled off the plant assembly line, and in March 2003 – Škoda Superb.

In October 2003, the production of the Volkswagen model range began, and in March 2004 – Audi production launch took place.

In 2006, another VW Group model, SEAT León, assembly was arranged. In the same year, the plant produced the first Ukrainian-manufactured SEAT Altea and SEAT Toledo and obtained permission to launch MKD production.

In 2007, the production of the Škoda Roomster car was arranged.

Škoda Rapid (2012) manufacturing started in 2013.

In 2014, the Škoda Spaceback production started.

Since 2017, the plant has been producing Škoda Kodiaq crossovers, and since 2018 – Škoda Karoq crossovers.

By 2020, the plant was producing Fabia, Octavia, Superb, Kodiaq, Karoq models.

In 2020, the plant assembled 3,386 vehicles (Škoda cars comprised 100% of the production volume). The plant's share in passenger car production in 2020 amounted to 81%.

== Production ==
The plant production lines are supplied with the world's leading manufacturer's equipment, e.g. Transsystem (Poland), Chropynska Strojirna (Czech Republic), EISENMANN (Germany), and others. Eurocar facilities include a number of technological innovations, software, and personnel ensuring production process flexibility and providing technical solutions being unique for Ukraine.

The cars are assembled on a standard production line with a total length of 538 meters. Car assembly is carried out on a conveyor line involving a production method similar to the one applicable by Škoda Auto a.s.

The welding and painting shops SOP started in 2011 allowing the plant to reach a new level of technology for the full-scale industrial production of passenger cars meeting all international quality standards.

During the period 2002–2020, the plant's production output has amounted to 194.3 thousand passenger cars (including 177.8 thousand Škoda cars) (by January 1, 2021).

== Product quality ==
In 2003, the quality control system of the Eurocar plant was certified for compliance with the international standard ISO 9001:2000.

In 2009, 2012, 2015, and 2018, the company has successfully confirmed its compliance with ISO 9001:2008.

Certification audits and confirmations are conducted by the Prague representative office of TUV NORD CERT GmbH (Germany). Eurocar confirms the validity of the enterprise quality control management application with respective certificate on the annular basis.

In October 2009, Eurocar successfully participated in the OHSAS 18001:2007 certification, which validates the use of a modern and efficient labor protection system at the enterprise meeting the highest international requirements. An independent audit confirmed that all production operations are performed with modern technical equipment and tools satisfying European and Ukrainian quality, labor protection, and safety standards. The certificate was verified in 2012, 2015, and 2018.

The company's personnel working on production sites have received special training in Czech Republic at Škoda Auto a.s. enterprises. Since 2008, educational and methodological department for personnel training has been established and has operated, it provides training, performance evaluation, advanced training of personnel, an audit of workplaces, and working conditions.

== Products ==
Since 2001, the Eurocar plant has produced models of Volkswagen, Audi, SEAT, and Škoda brands.

Currently, all the production facilities of the company are used for the Škoda cars production.

All manufactured cars are sold on the territory of Ukraine via the company Eurocar LLC, which belongs to Atoll Holding Group of Companies. At the end of 2020, 5,093 Škoda cars were sold which accounted for 5.9% of the market (the 4th place in the brand rating by the number of sales)

== Environmental protection ==
The technical equipment used at the plant ensures low energy consumption and a high level of environmental friendliness. Special treatment facilities are used to minimize the negative environmental impact. A reverse water supply system for technical equipment is used to reduce water consumption and its pollution.
