= Paunch =

Paunch may refer to:

- The rumen, the larger part of the reticulorumen, the first chamber in the digestive tract of ruminant animals
- The abdomen of someone with central obesity

== See also ==
- Panch (disambiguation)
