= Panch =

Panch may refer to

- PANCH, The Preston & Northcote Community Hospital
- Petro Panch, Ukrainan writer

Panch (literally five in Hindi) may refer to:

- Panch phoron, a blend of five spices
- Panch pallava, a ritual assortment of five leaves
- Panch Kalyanaka, the "five auspicious events" in Jainism
- Panch Prayag, five sacred river confluences in Hindu tradition

== See also ==
- Panche (disambiguation)
- Panchi (disambiguation)
- Paunch (disambiguation)
- Ponch (disambiguation)
