= Poncha (disambiguation) =

Poncha may refer to:

- Poncha, an alcoholic drink from the island of Madeira
- Poncha Pass, a mountain pass in south-central Colorado
- Poncha Springs, Colorado, a town in Chaffee County

People

- Poncha (cacique), a native leader encountered by Vasco Núñez de Balboa in Panama
- Cyrus Poncha (b. 1976), an Indian squash coach
- Rehan Poncha (b. 1986), an Indian swimmer

== See also ==
- Ponca (disambiguation)
