= Panchi (disambiguation) =

Panchi is a 1999 album by Pakistani progressive rock band Mizraab. Panchi may also refer to:

== People ==
- Panchi Barrera (born 1985), Uruguayan-Spanish basketball player
- Panchi Bora (fl. 2000s–2010s), Indian television actress and model
- Khin Poe Panchi (born c. 2003), Burmese traditional and folk singer
- Panchi, character in the film, Tu Mera Hero

== Other ==
- Diploderma panchi, or the Panchi mountain dragon, a species of lizard endemic to China
- Rookada Panchi, 2020 Sri Lankan Sinhala children's musical drama film

== See also ==
- Paanchi, Nephite rebel in the List of Book of Mormon people
- Panche people, indigenous group of people in what is now Colombia
  - Panche language, their hypothesized language
- Panshi, city of south-central Jilin province of Northeast China
- Panshih-class fast combat support ship, single-ship class of the Republic of China Navy
- Panch (disambiguation)
