= Škoda Superb =

Czech large family car

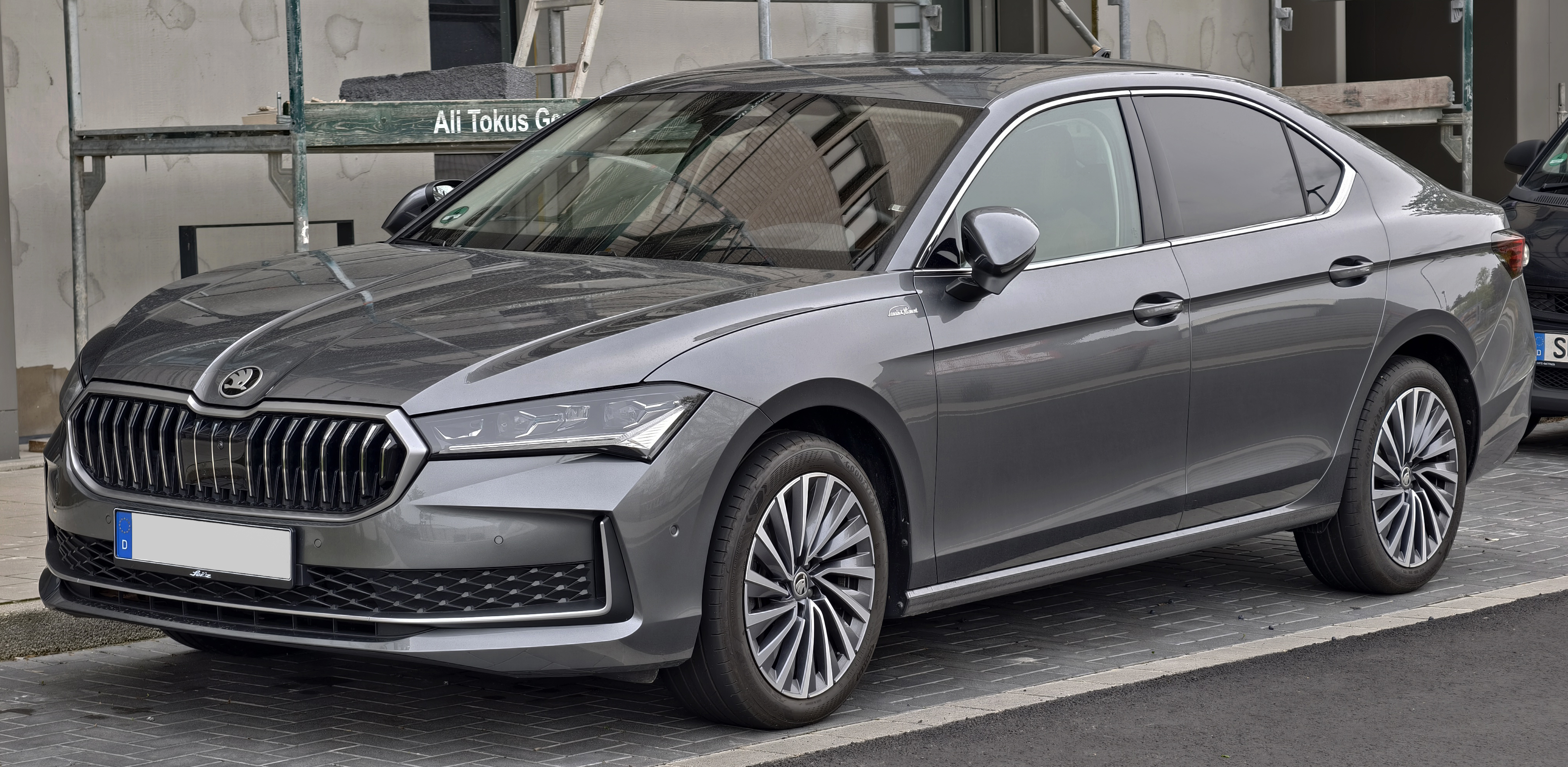
- Fourth generation Škoda Superb

Overview
- Manufacturer: Škoda Auto
- Production: 2001–present

Body and chassis
- Class: Mid-size car/large family car (D)

The Škoda Superb is a mid-size/compact executive car (D-segment) produced by the Czech automobile manufacturer Škoda Auto since 2001. It has been offered in four-door saloon, liftback and estate body styles, with the estate marketed as the Superb Combi. The Superb name was historically used for Škoda cars produced between 1934 and 1949.

Four generations of the modern Superb have been introduced, in 2001, 2008, 2015 and 2023. The second generation added an estate version, while the third adopted the Volkswagen Group's MQB platform and became available with a plug-in hybrid powertrain in 2019. The fourth generation uses the updated MQB Evo platform, was developed alongside the Volkswagen Passat and is manufactured in Bratislava.

== First generation (B5, Typ 3U; 2001) ==
First generation B5
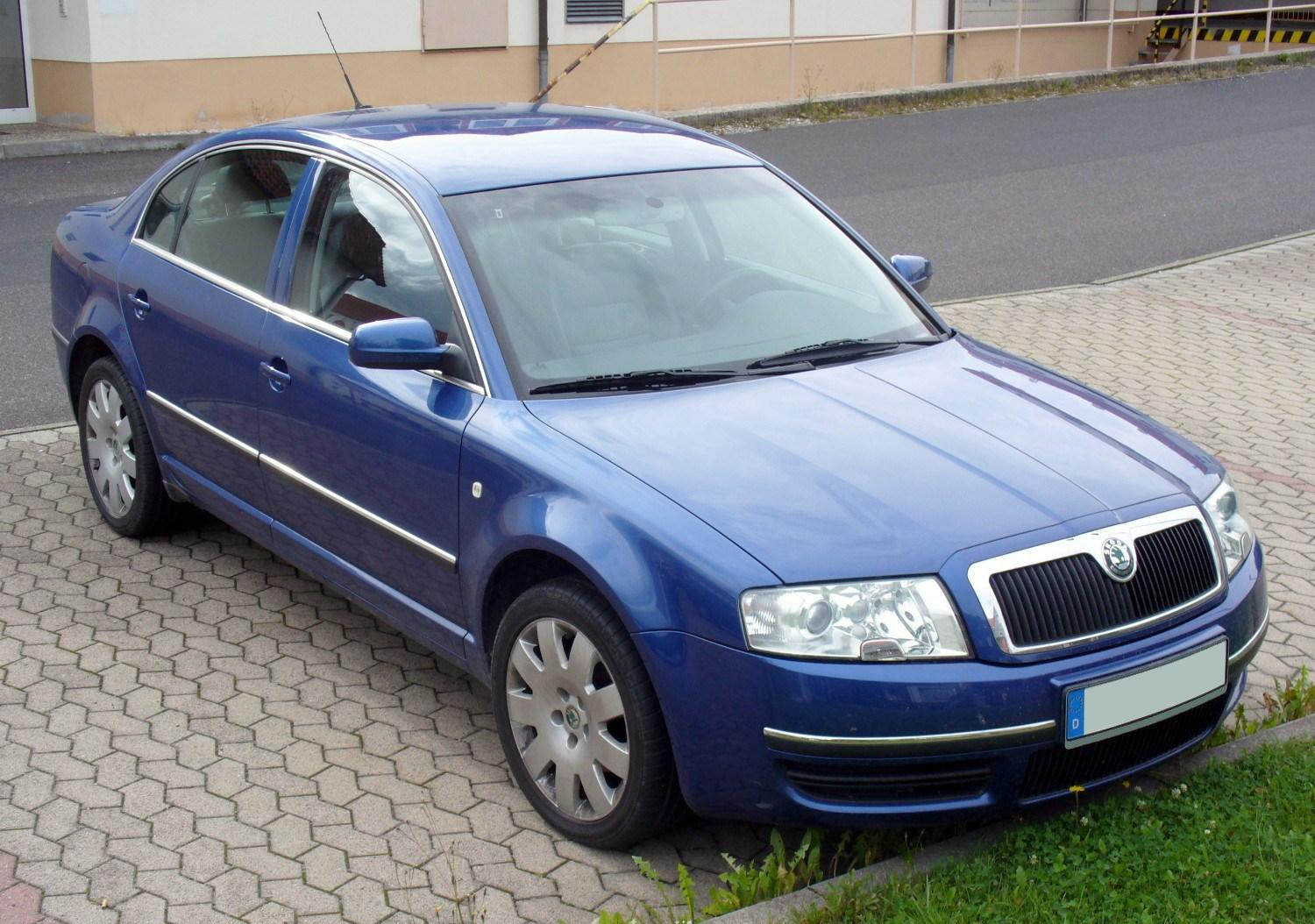

Overview
- Model code: 3U
- Production: October 2001–March 2008
- Assembly: Czech Republic: Kvasiny (Škoda Auto Kvasiny); Bosnia and Herzegovina: Sarajevo; Ukraine: Solomonovo (Eurocar); Kazakhstan: Oskemen (AZIA AVTO)
- Designer: Thomas Ingenlath

Body and chassis
- Body style: 4-door saloon
- Layout: Longitudinal front-engine, front-wheel-drive
- Platform: Volkswagen Group B5 (PL45+)
- Related: Volkswagen Passat Lingyu; Volkswagen Passat (B5); Audi A4 (B5)

Powertrain
- Engine: Petrol: 1.8 L I4 turbo 2.0 L I4; 2.8 L V6; DIesel: 1.9 L TDI PD I4; 2.0 L TDI PD I4; 2.5 L TDI V6
- Transmission: 5-speed manual 6-speed manual 5-speed automatic

Dimensions
- Wheelbase: 2,803 mm (110.4 in)
- Length: 4,803 mm (189.1 in)
- Width: 1,765 mm (69.5 in)
- Height: 1,449–1,489 mm (57.0–58.6 in)

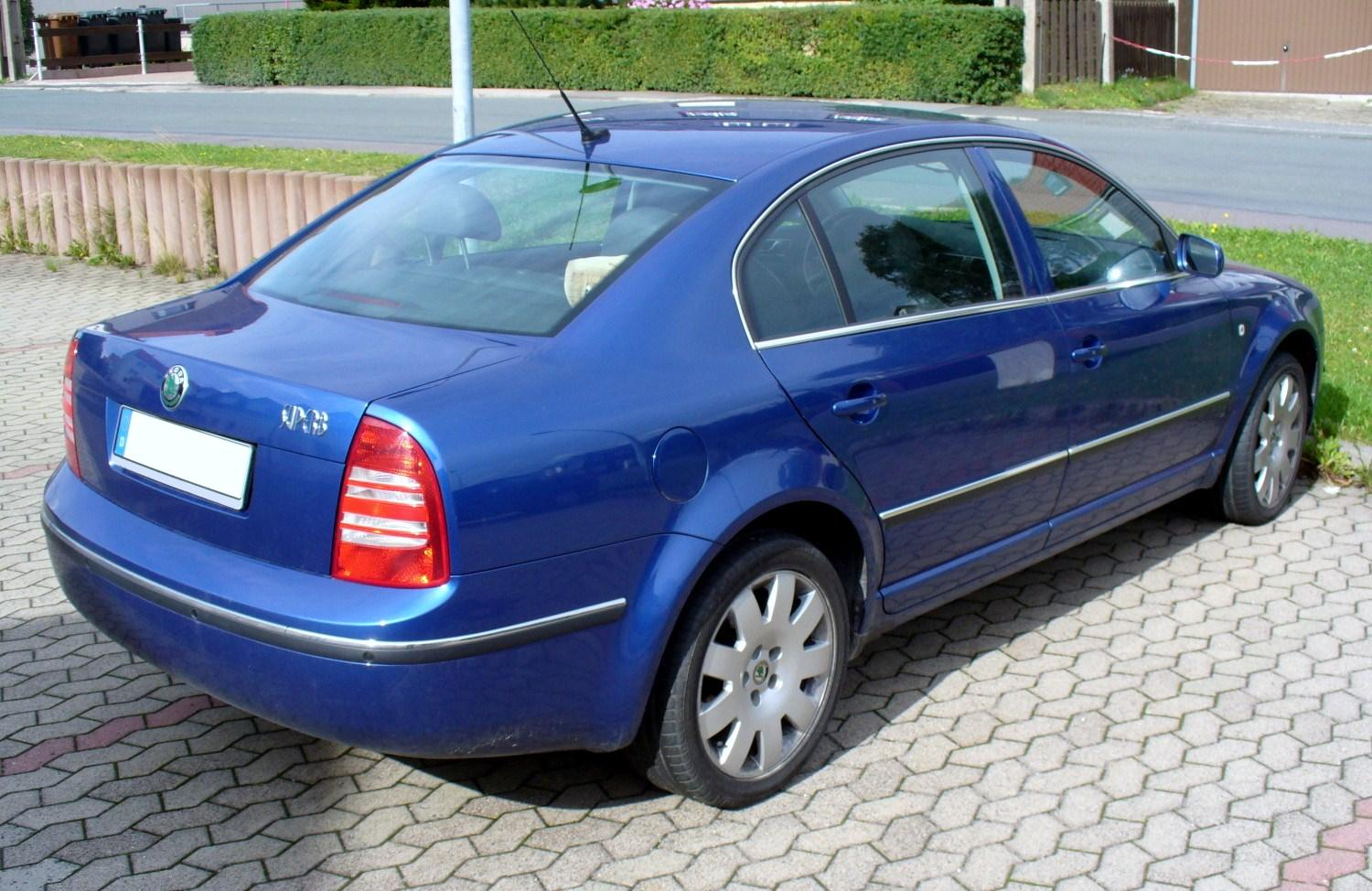
Pre-facelift Škoda Superb

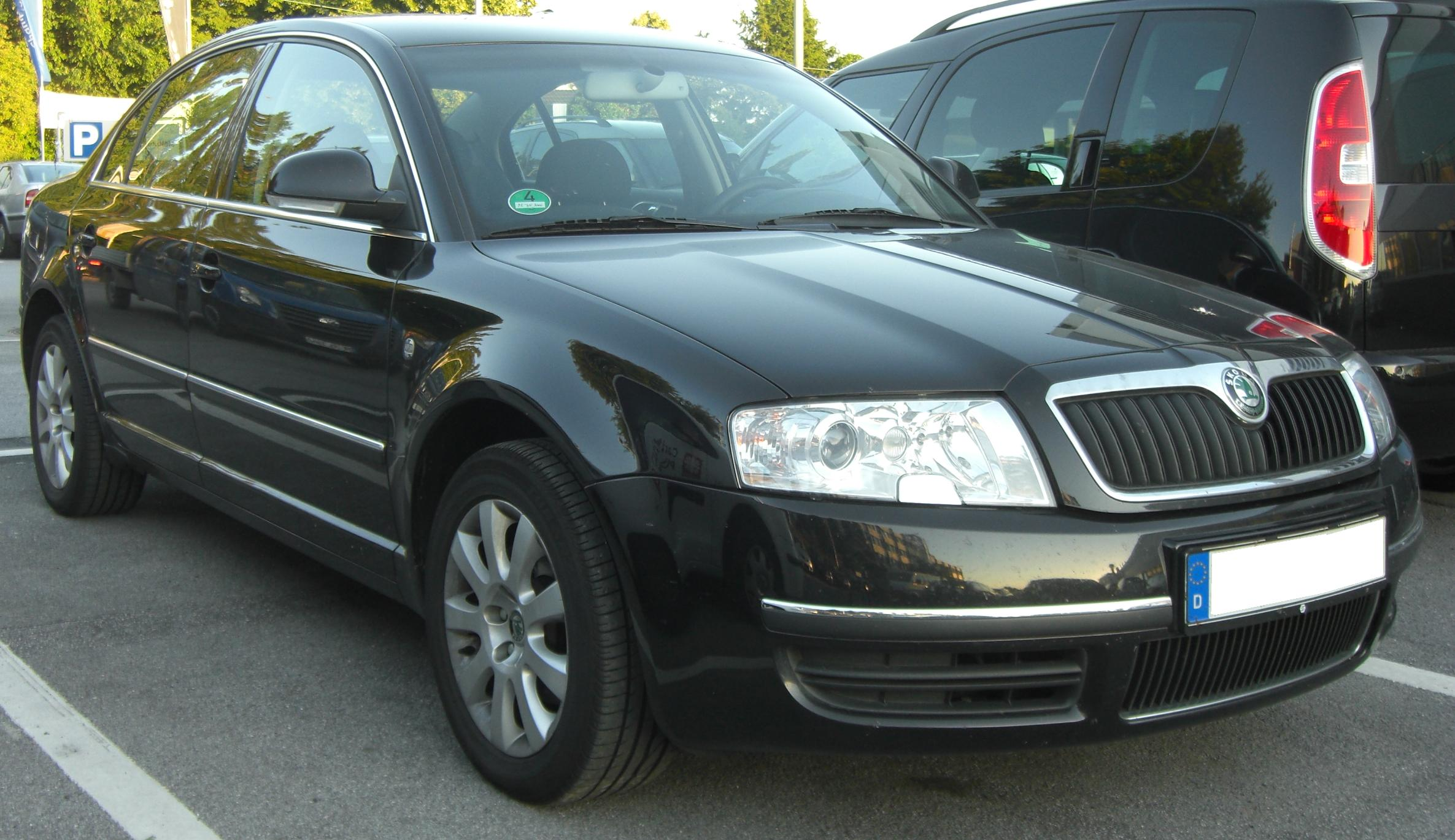
Facelifted Škoda Superb

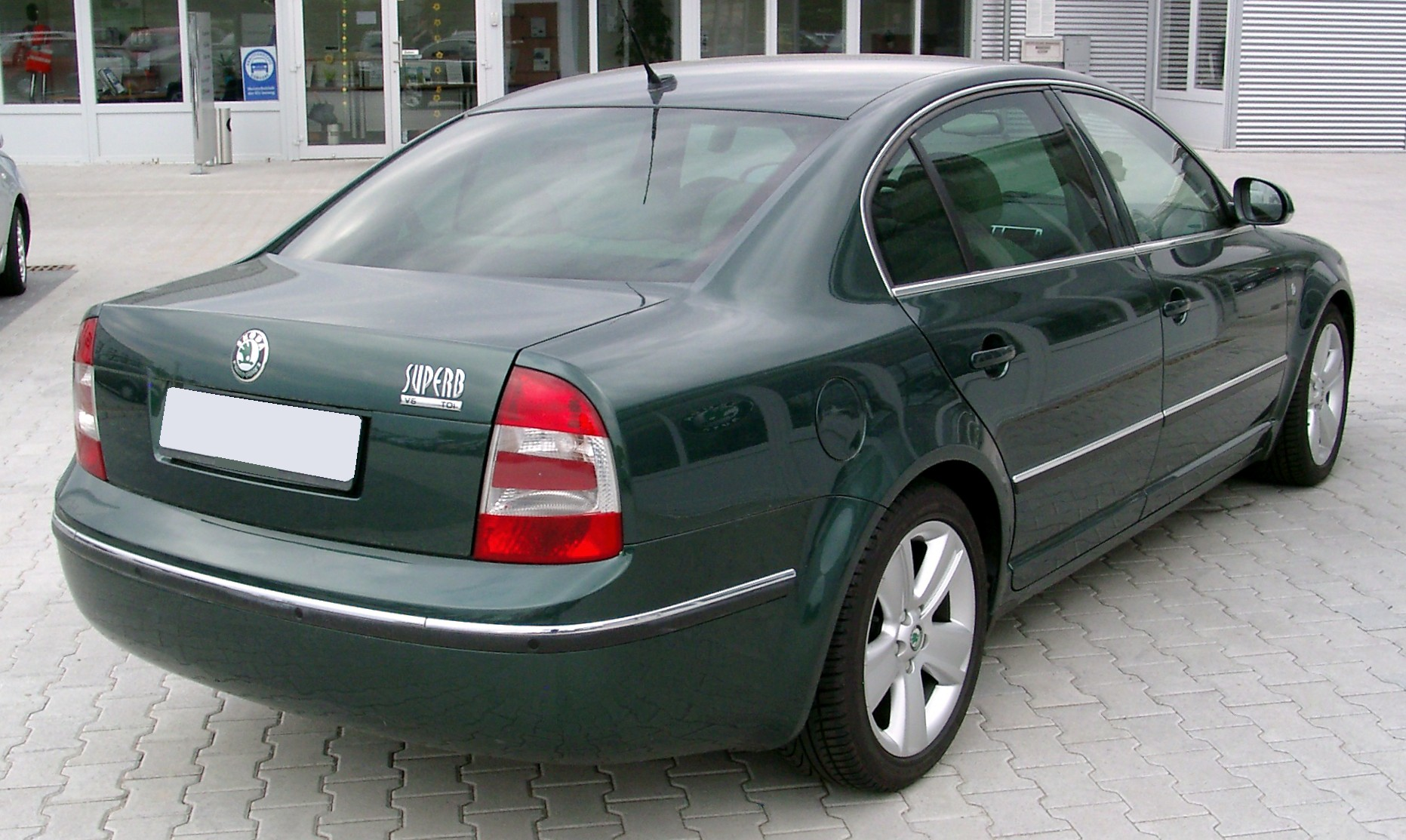
Facelifted Škoda Superb

=== History ===
In 2001, Škoda Auto presented the Montreux concept car at the Geneva International Motor Show, with the production version being released the same year as the Superb.

The first generation of the modern Škoda Superb was based on the 1999 Shanghai–Volkswagen Passat B5 LWB, which has a 10 cm (3.9 in) longer wheelbase than the standard Passat B5 and used the Volkswagen Group B5 PL45+ platform. In 2005, Shanghai-Volkswagen imported the Superb, rebadging it as the Volkswagen Passat Lingyu.

In 2009, one year after the B5 generation had been discontinued in Europe, the facelifted Volkswagen Passat Lingyu was unveiled in China. In 2011, the Volkswagen Passat Lingyu was discontinued, succeeded by the Passat NMS.

Several petrol and diesel internal combustion engines are shared with the rest of the Volkswagen Group range; and like the B5 Passat and B6/B7 Audi A4 which use the same automobile platform, they are mounted at the front, and orientated longitudinally.

The base model, the 'Classic', included the 1.9 litre inline four cylinder (I4) Turbocharged Direct Injection (TDI) turbodiesel producing 74 kilowatts (101 PS; 99 bhp), or a 2.0 litre petrol inline four rated at 85 kW (116 PS; 114 bhp). The 'Comfort' and 'Elegance' models offered with a 1.8 twenty valve Turbo petrol I4 rated at 119 kW (162 PS; 160 bhp), or either a 142 kW (193 PS; 190 bhp) V6 2.8 litre petrol engine, or a 2.5 litre V6 TDI rated at 120 kW (163 PS; 161 bhp).

Transmissions included a five speed or a six speed manual gearbox, or a ZF sourced five speed tiptronic automatic. In addition to the 1.9 litre "Pumpe Düse" (PD) Unit Injector engine, the Superb eventually gained the 103 kW (140 PS; 138 bhp) 2.0 litre TDI PD (BSS). This was an 8V single camshaft engine based on the 1.9 litre TDI that was unique to the Superb with two main differences over the 1.9 litre TDI. The BSS engine shared the same twin balance shaft oil pump used in the 16V twin camshaft 2.0 litre TDI PD engine that can be found in various Audi models. It also featured a wet DPF that used fluid contained in a tank under the spare wheel to generate heat for regeneration. This was used over a standard dry DPF due to space limitations in the engine bay.

The Superb received a minor facelift in August 2006 incorporating Škoda's new radiator grille, headlights, side repeater indicators integrated into the door mirrors, and C-shaped tail lights in the style of Škoda Roomster and second-gen Škoda Octavia.

An interior redesign completed the upgrades. A 'Laurin and Klement' model became the top of the range, replacing the 'Elegance' model. A range of new engines was introduced and the interior featured real wood as part of some trim levels. The 'Comfort', 'Elegance' and 'Laurin & Klement' models feature an umbrella stowed in the rear door panel. It was also the first Škoda to be available with an optional CD navigation system called the DX, with that option you automatically got the more powerful Sound System with 8 speakers, DSP amplifier, more DSP effects in the audio settings such as Sound Focus, Genre based EQ, more advanced speed-sensitive volume control and a 6-CD changer.

Škoda considered a station wagon version of the Superb. However, it was never put in production, the reason being Volkswagen feared that such a version would take too much market share from its own Passat Variant and Audi's A4 Avant. When the Superb was released in the United Kingdom in May 2002, the most expensive variant was priced at only £1,000 more than the cheapest Jaguar X-Type.

=== Engines ===
Engine designation	Engine code (family)	Displacement	Max. power	Max. torque	Top speed	0–100 km/h (0–62 mph) (s)
1.8 T	AWT	1,781 cc (108.7 cu in)	150 hp (112 kW) at 5700 rpm	155 lb⋅ft (210 N⋅m) at 1750 rpm	134 mph (216 km/h)	9.5
2.0	AZM (EA827)	1,984 cc (121.1 cu in)	115 hp (86 kW) at 5400 rpm	127 lb⋅ft (172 N⋅m) at 3500 rpm	122 mph (196 km/h)	11.6
2.8 V6	ACK/APR	2,771 cc (169.1 cu in)	190 hp (142 kW) at 6000 rpm	207 lb⋅ft (281 N⋅m) at 3200 rpm	147 mph (237 km/h)	8.0
1.9 TDI-PD	AVB (EA188)	1,896 cc (115.7 cu in)	99 hp (74 kW) at 4000 rpm	184 lb⋅ft (249 N⋅m) at 1900 rpm	117 mph (188 km/h)	13.2
1.9 TDI-PD	BLS (EA188)	1,896 cc (115.7 cu in)	104 hp (78 kW) at 4000 rpm	184 lb⋅ft (249 N⋅m) at 1900 rpm	119 mph (192 km/h)	12.3
1.9 TDI-PD	BPZ (EA188)	1,896 cc (115.7 cu in)	114 hp (85 kW) at 4000 rpm	210 lb⋅ft (285 N⋅m) at 1900 rpm	119 mph (192 km/h)	12.3
1.9 TDI-PD	AWX (EA188)	1,896 cc (115.7 cu in)	128 hp (95 kW) at 4000 rpm	215 lb⋅ft (292 N⋅m) at 1750-2500 rpm	127 mph (204 km/h)	10.4
2.0 TDI-PD	BSS (EA188)	1,968 cc (120.1 cu in)	138 hp (103 kW) at 4000 rpm	236 lb⋅ft (320 N⋅m) at 1900 rpm	133 mph (214 km/h)	9.6
2.5 V6 TDI	AYM/BDG	2,496 cc (152.3 cu in)	161 hp (120 kW) at 4000 rpm	258 lb⋅ft (350 N⋅m) at 1250 rpm	139 mph (224 km/h)	9.2

=== Safety ===
Euro NCAP test results* Škoda Superb (2003)
Test	Score	Rating
Adult occupant:	26	4 /5 stars
Pedestrian:	0	0 /4 stars

== Second generation (B6, Typ 3T; 2008) ==
Second generation B6
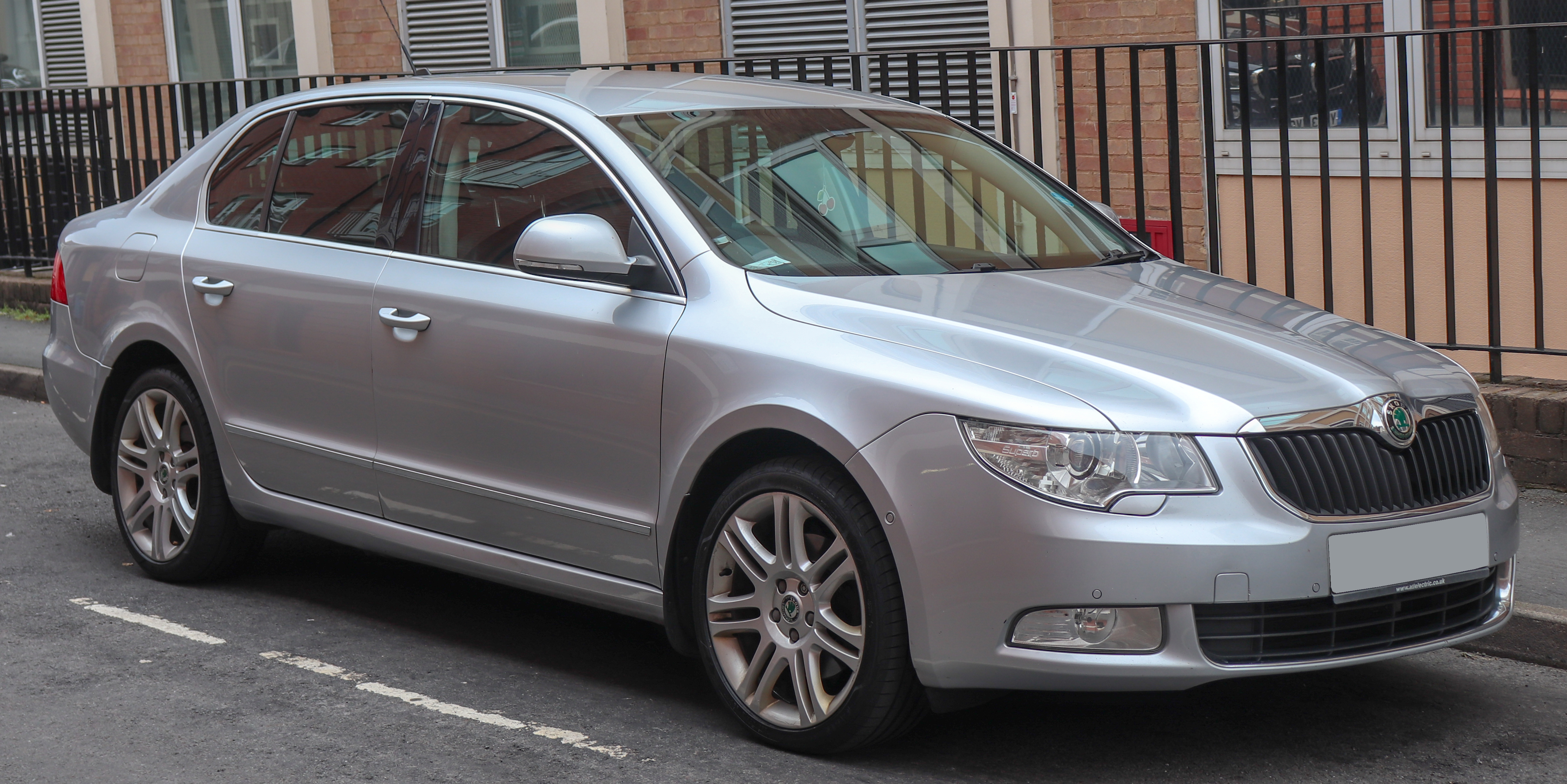

Overview
- Model code: 3T
- Production: 2008–2015
- Assembly: Czech Republic: Kvasiny; China: Anting, Shanghai (Shanghai Volkswagen); India: Gondia (Škoda India) (Otto Roomster); Ukraine: Solomonovo (Eurocar); Kazakhstan: Oskemen (AZIA AVTO)
- Designer: Jens Manske

Body and chassis
- Body style: 4-door sedan 5-door estate
- Layout: Transverse front-engine, front-wheel-drive or all-wheel-drive
- Platform: Volkswagen Group A6 (PQ46)
- Related: Volkswagen Passat (B6); Volkswagen Passat (B7); Volkswagen Passat NMS; Volkswagen CC; Volkswagen Sharan (7N); Volkswagen Tiguan (5N); SEAT Alhambra (7N)

Powertrain
- Engine: Petrol: 1.4 L EA111 TSI I4; 1.8 L EA888 TSI I4; 2.0 L EA888 TSI I4; 3.6 L EA390 VR6; Diesel: 1.6 L EA189 TDI CR I4; 1.9 L EA188 TDI PD I4; 2.0 L EA188 TDI PD I4; 2.0 L EA189 TDI CR I4
- Transmission: 5-speed manual 6-speed manual 6-speed automatic (DSG); 7-speed automatic (DSG)

Dimensions
- Wheelbase: 2,761 mm (108.7 in)
- Length: 4,838 mm (190.5 in)
- Width: 1,817 mm (71.5 in)
- Height: 1,462 mm (57.6 in)

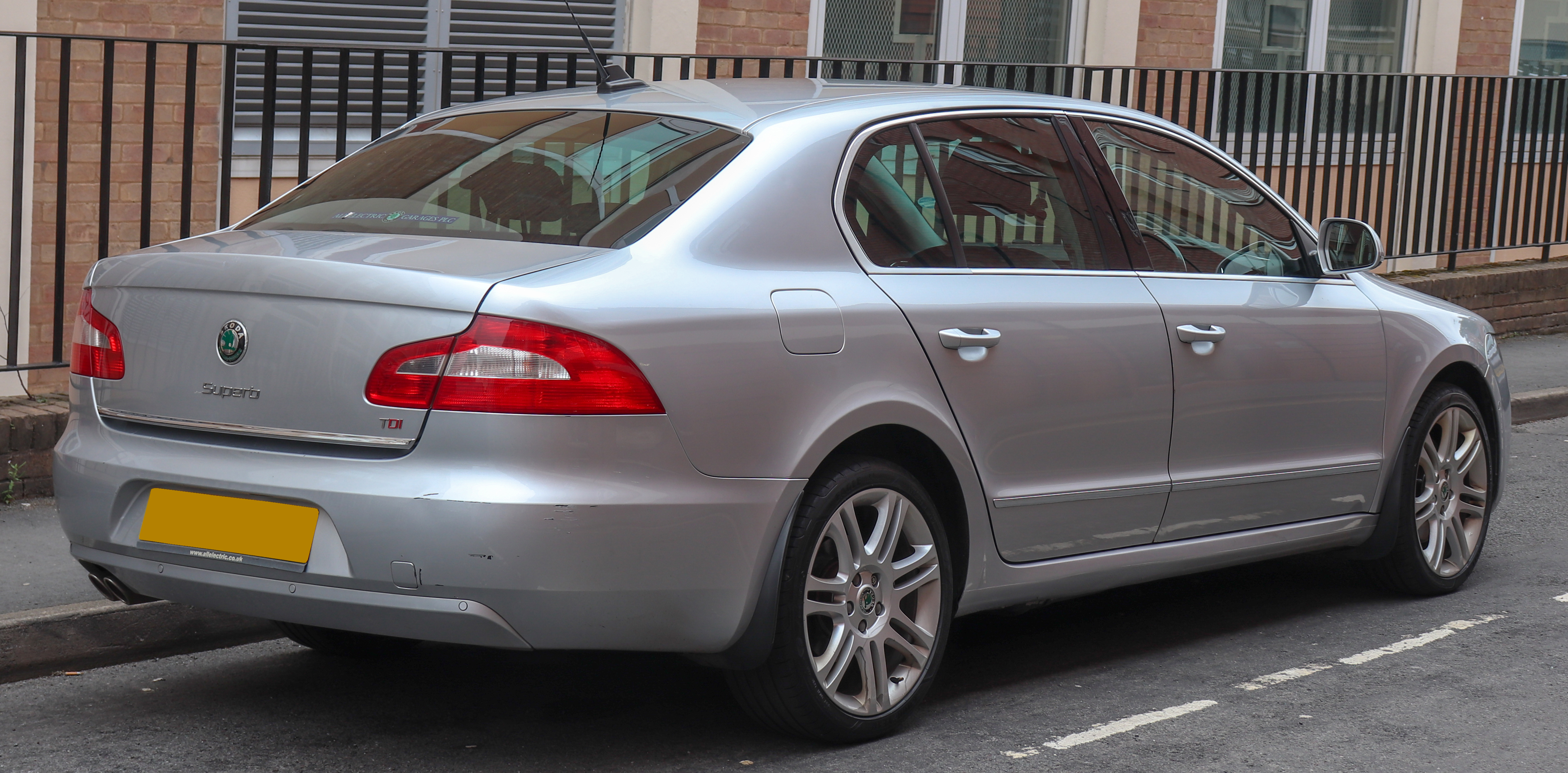
Škoda Superb sedan

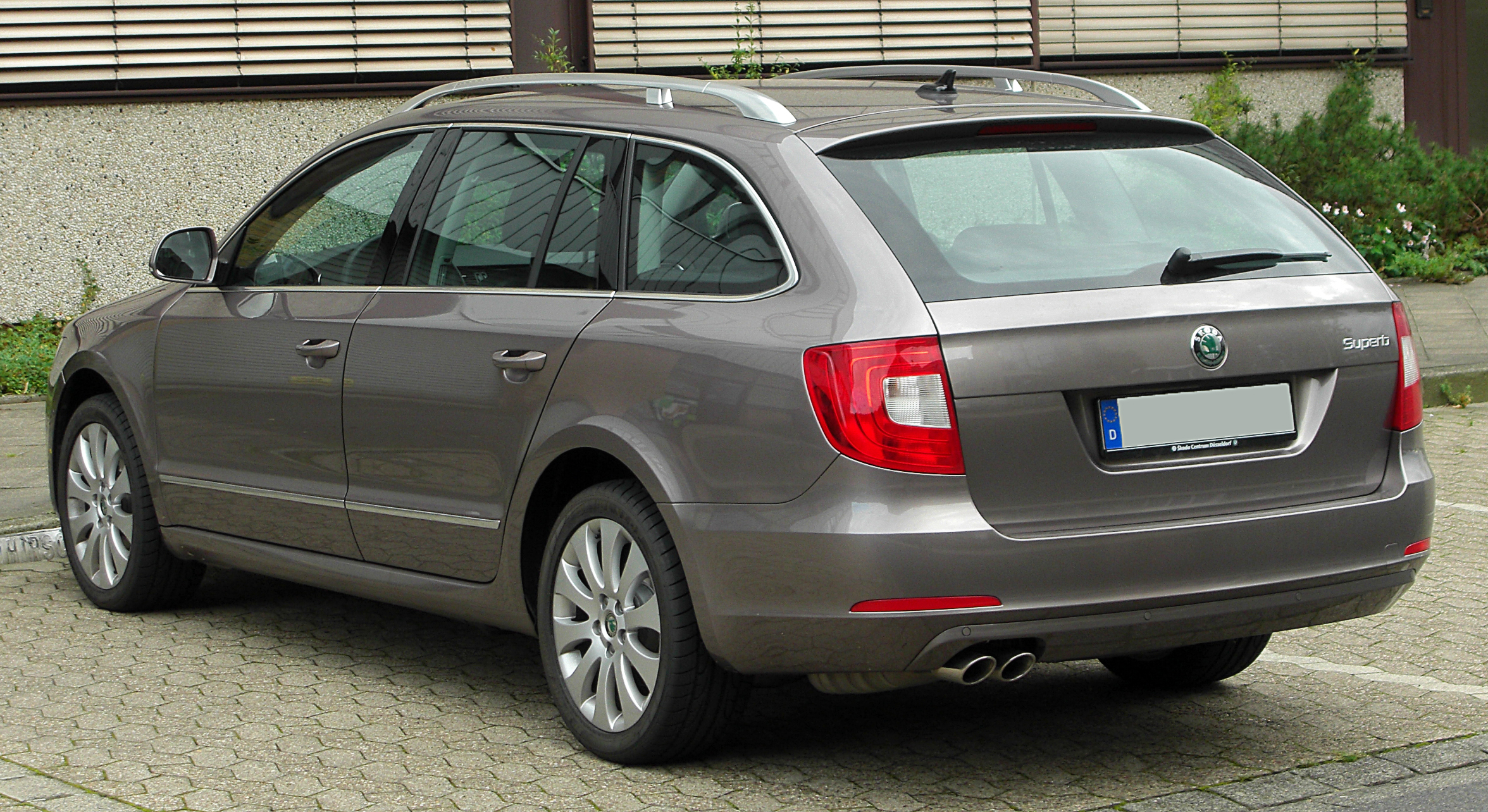
Škoda Superb Combi

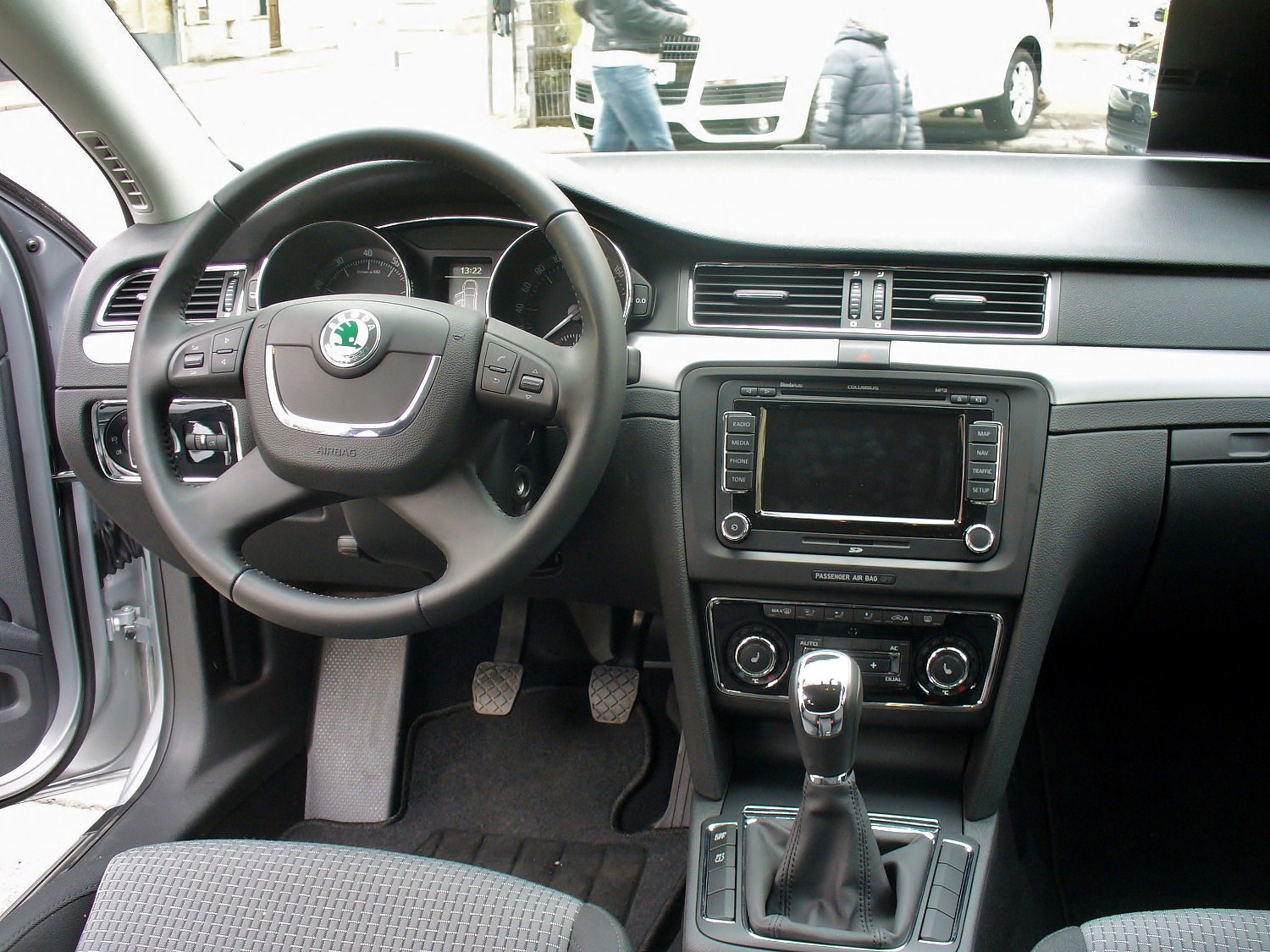
Interior

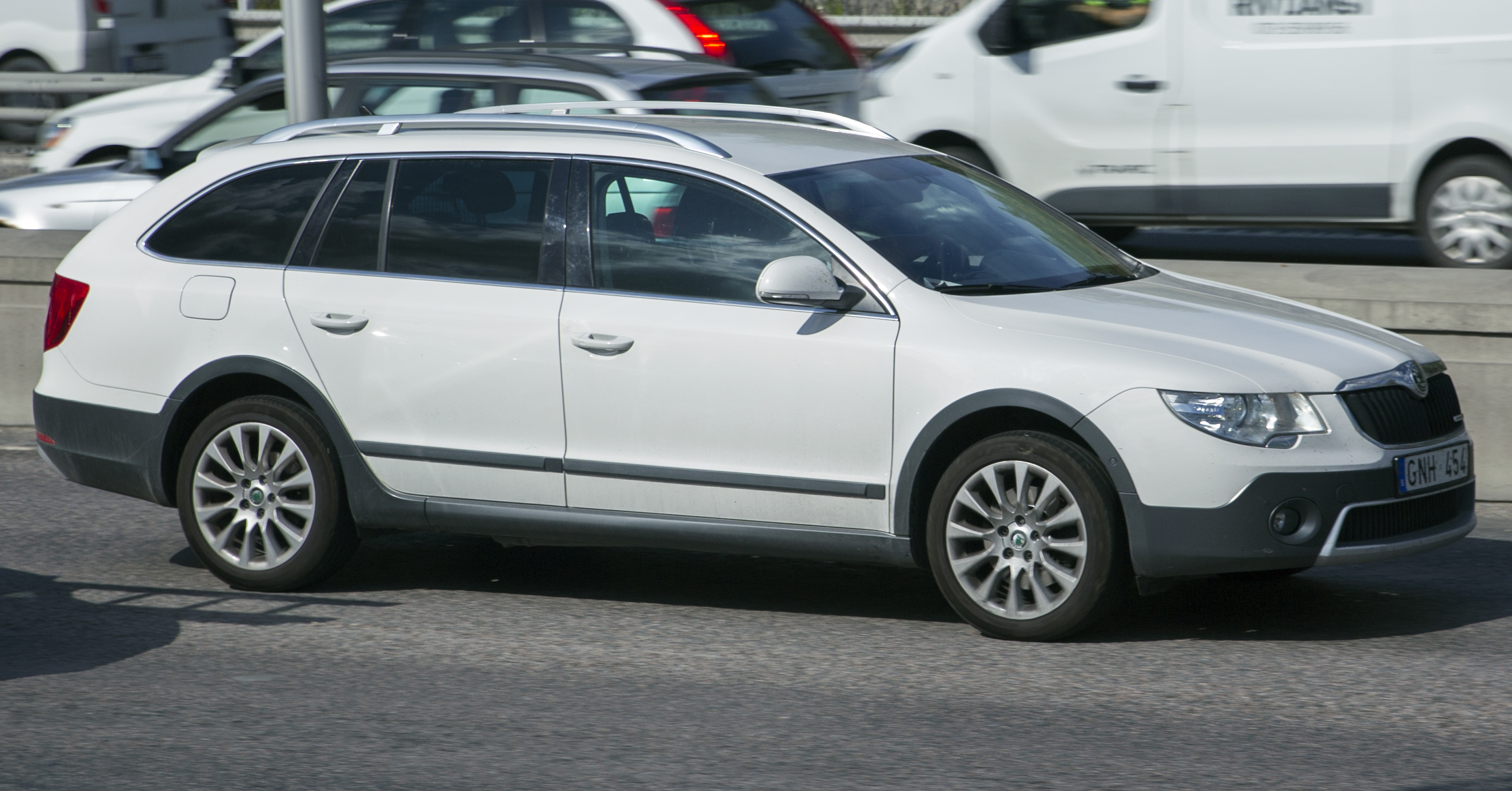
Škoda Superb Combi AllDrive (Sweden)

An all new Škoda Superb (B6, Typ 3T) was unveiled at the Geneva Motor Show in early March 2008.

Based on a stretched version of the latest A5 Octavia platform, the Volkswagen Group A6 PQ46, this Superb is a four door five seat sedan, with an innovative "TwinDoor" trunk lid that can operate as a conventional trunk or as a hatchback that includes opening with the rear glass.

Being based on the Octavia A5 platform, this Superb now uses a transverse engine layout. A Superb Combi – five door estate with 633 litres in the boot – was presented to the press in June 2009, and debuted at the Frankfurt Motor Show in September 2009.

When launched, petrol engine options included four Volkswagen Group sourced units; consisting of an entry-level 92 kilowatts (125 PS; 123 hp) 1.4 litre inline four cylinder (I4) TFSI (with a turbocharger and Fuel Stratified Injection), and a 118 kW (160 PS; 158 hp) 1.8 litre I4 TFSI. The flagship 3.6 litre 191 kW (260 PS; 256 hp) FSI VR6 engine (a detuned version of that fitted in the Passat R36) comes with four-wheel drive and six speed Direct-Shift Gearbox (DSG). The Škoda Superb 3.6 FSI 4x4 has a top speed 250 km/h and acceleration of 0–100 km/h in 6.5 seconds.

Diesel engine options included 2.0 litre I4 Turbocharged Direct Injection (TDI) with Pumpe-Düse injection which was rated at 103 kW (140 PS; 138 hp), 2.0 litre I4 TDI 125 kW (170 PS; 168 hp) with common rail, and a 77 kW (105 PS; 103 hp) 1.9 litre I4 TDI available also for the Greenline version with reduced fuel consumption.

In 2010, the engine range was updated. The car was now available with a 147 kW (200 PS; 197 hp) 2.0 litre TFSI petrol four cylinder. Changes in diesel offer included two switches: 103 kW (140 PS; 138 hp) two litre with Pumpe-Düse injection was replaced with common rail engine; the 77 kW (105 PS; 103 hp) 1.9 litre PD unit was replaced with 1.6 litre common rail engine of the same power.

Transmissions include five and six speed manual gearboxes, and the popular automatic Direct-Shift Gearbox (DSG) with either six or seven speeds, as an option on almost all engine/trim combinations. In addition to the standard front-wheel-drive, the Superb and Superb Combi were both available with all-wheel-drive with a fourth generation Haldex clutch. The wheel sizes were a choice of 16, 17 and 18-inches.

Trim levels available in the majority of Europe were named the 'Comfort', 'Ambition', 'Elegance', 'Greenline', 'Exclusive' and 'Laurin & Klement' (May 2012) – with Laurin & Klement being top of the range. In the United Kingdom, the levels available were 'S', 'SE', 'Elegance', 'Laurin & Klement' and 'Greenline'. In Sweden, an important market for Škoda, a version of the four-wheel-drive Superb Combi with off-road pretensions went on sale in June 2012. Analogous to the Subaru Outback and Volvo XC70 it was called the "AllDrive." Based on the Elegance equipment level it features black plastic cladding around the lower parts of the car and around the wheelwells. Its ground clearance is also increased to the tune of 20 mm (0.79 in) and a front skid plate is added. In Sweden it was only available with the three different engines (one petrol, two diesels) and four-wheel-drive, but when the model was made available across Europe as the "Škoda Superb Outdoor" one month later (reaching the United Kingdom in October 2012) it was also available with front-wheel-drive, and most of the engine range.

For the Superb there is an extensive list of standard and extra equipment, including bi-xenon headlamps with AFS, front/rear proximity sensors, automatic park assist system, tyre pressure monitoring system, navigation system with large 6.5-inch colour touch screen display and 30 GB hard drive, television broadcast receiver, 12-speaker Sound System with Surround Sound (Amundsen, Bolero, Columbus), electrically adjustable seats and mirrors, rain sensor, sunroof with solar panels that allow circulation of air in parked car, front/rear heated seats, ventilated front seats upholstered in leather. For the Superb Combi a large tilt/slide two piece panoramic sunroof was an option.

=== Selected acknowledgements ===
- 2009: Luxury Car of the Year in 2009 by Top Gear Magazine
- 2009: Towcar of the Year 2009, and Class Winner 2010 (over 1800 kg AWD Category) by UK Caravan Club
- 2012: Best imported car survey in the German magazine Auto, Motor und Sport
- 2012: Highest score in the JD Power customer satisfaction study (UK) in the mid-size segment
- 2011-13: Best-Value Family Car in Australian Money magazine

=== Facelift ===
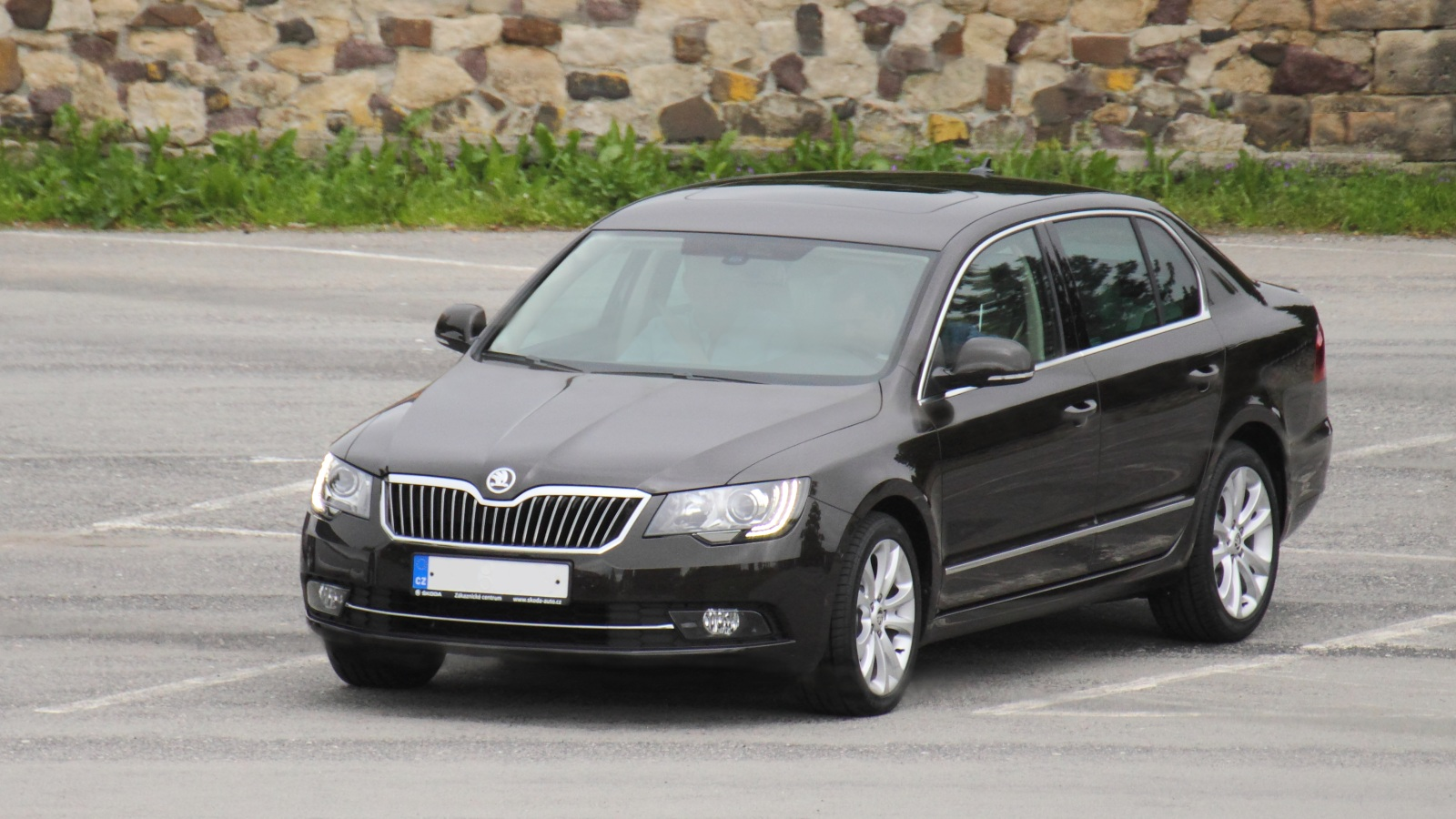
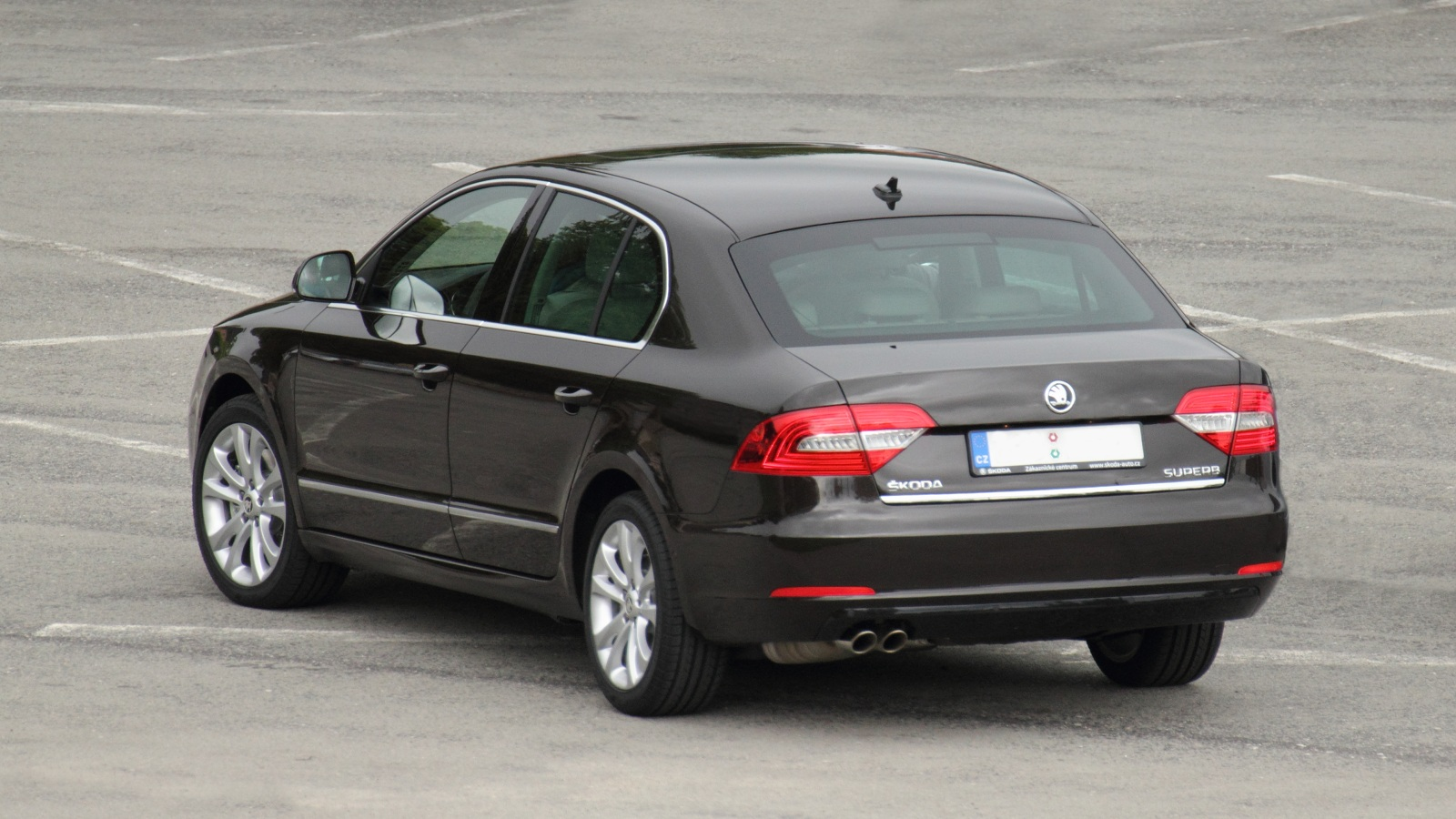
2013 facelift

In April 2013, Škoda unveiled a facelifted Superb in Shanghai. It was released for sale in the European market in June 2013. Updated exterior design features Škoda new design language elements. Headlights are fitted with integrated LED daylight running lights; diodes are standard for tail lights, too. The Twindoor opening mechanism was changed in order to provide easier operation: one button opens just the lid, while the other opens whole tailgate.

Up to now, one button was dedicated just for opening, while the other had shifting function. With the facelift, a combination of all wheel drive and DSG automatic transmission appeared on offer for the 125 kW two litre diesel engine. Starting from January 2014, design Outdoor package is available for the Superb Combi.

The list of features was slightly expanded too. The facelifted Superb received the latest generation of Automatic Parking Assistant. In addition to parallel parking (entering/exiting the parking space), the system is also capable of perpendicular parking (entering the parking space only).

From now on, the passengers in the rear seats can adjust the passenger seat from the back. The electrical control is located on the side of the passenger seat near the centre console and is thus easy to operate from the back. Passengers in the rear can move the front seat forward and back and adjust the seat height and angle.

=== Engines ===
Overview of engines available for the second generation Superb (B6, Typ 3T), incl. facelifted model.

Engine designation	Production	Engine code (family)	Displacement	Max. power	Max. torque	Top speed	0–100 km/h (0–62 mph) (s)
1.4 TSI 92 kW	2008–2015	CAXC (EA111)	1,390 cc (84.8 cu in)	92 kW (123 hp) at 5000 rpm	200 N⋅m (148 lb⋅ft) at 1500–4000 rpm	204 km/h (127 mph)	10.5
1.8 TSI 112 kW	2009–2015	CDAB (EA888)	1,798 cc (109.7 cu in)	112 kW (150 hp) at 4300–6200 rpm	250 N⋅m (184 lb⋅ft) at 1500–4200 rpm	219 km/h (136 mph)	8.8
1.8 TSI 118 kW	2008–2015	CDAA (EA888)	1,798 cc (109.7 cu in)	118 kW (158 hp) at 4500–6200 rpm	250 N⋅m (184 lb⋅ft) at 1500–4200 rpm	219 km/h (136 mph)	8.4
2.0 TSI 147 kW	2010–2013 gen1 2013–2015 gen2	CAWB (EA888 gen1) CCZA (EA888 gen2)	1,984 cc (121.1 cu in)	147 kW (197 hp) at 5100–6000 rpm	280 N⋅m (207 lb⋅ft) at 1700–5000 rpm	240 km/h (149 mph)	7.7
3.6 FSI VR6 191 kW	2008–2015	(EA390)	3,597 cc (219.5 cu in)	191 kW (256 hp) at 6000 rpm	350 N⋅m (258 lb⋅ft) at 2500–5000 rpm	250 km/h (155 mph)	6.4
1.6 TDI CR DPF 77 kW	2010–2015	CAYC (EA189)	1,598 cc (97.5 cu in)	77 kW (103 hp) at 4400 rpm	250 N⋅m (184 lb⋅ft) at 1500–2500 rpm	194 km/h (121 mph)	12.1
1.6 TDI CR DPF 77 kW GreenLine	2010–2015	CAYC (EA189)	1,598 cc (97.5 cu in)	77 kW (103 hp) at 4400 rpm	250 N⋅m (184 lb⋅ft) at 1500–2500 rpm	197 km/h (122 mph)	12.2
1.9 TDI PD 77 kW	2008–2010	(EA188)	1,896 cc (115.7 cu in)	77 kW (103 hp) at 4000 rpm	250 N⋅m (184 lb⋅ft) at 1900 rpm	190 km/h (118 mph)	12.5
1.9 TDI PD 77 kW GreenLine	2008–2010	(EA188)	1,896 cc (115.7 cu in)	77 kW (103 hp) at 4000 rpm	250 N⋅m (184 lb⋅ft) at 1900 rpm	193 km/h (120 mph)	12.5
2.0 TDI PD DPF 103 kW	2008–2010	(EA188)	1,968 cc (120.1 cu in)	103 kW (138 hp) at 4000 rpm	320 N⋅m (236 lb⋅ft) at 1800–2500 rpm	207 km/h (129 mph)	10.0
2.0 TDI CR DPF 103 kW	2009–2015	CFHC (EA189)	1,968 cc (120.1 cu in)	103 kW (138 hp) at 4200 rpm	320 N⋅m (236 lb⋅ft) at 1750–2500 rpm	205 km/h (127 mph)	10.0
2.0 TDI CR DPF 125 kW	2009–2015	CFJA (EA189)	1,968 cc (120.1 cu in)	125 kW (168 hp) at 4200 rpm	350 N⋅m (258 lb⋅ft) at 1750–2500 rpm	228 km/h (142 mph)	8.6

=== Safety ===
Euro NCAP test results* Škoda Superb (2009)
Test	Points	%
Overall:	5 /5 stars	
Adult occupant:	32	90%
Child occupant:	40	81%
Pedestrian:	18	50%
Safety assist:	5	71%

ANCAP test results* Skoda Superb (2009)
Test	Score
Overall	5 /5 stars
Frontal offset	14.75/16
Side impact	16/16
Pole	2/2
Seat belt reminders	2/3
Whiplash protection	Not Assessed
Pedestrian protection	Marginal
Electronic stability control	Standard

== Third generation (B8, Typ 3V; 2015) ==
Third generation B8
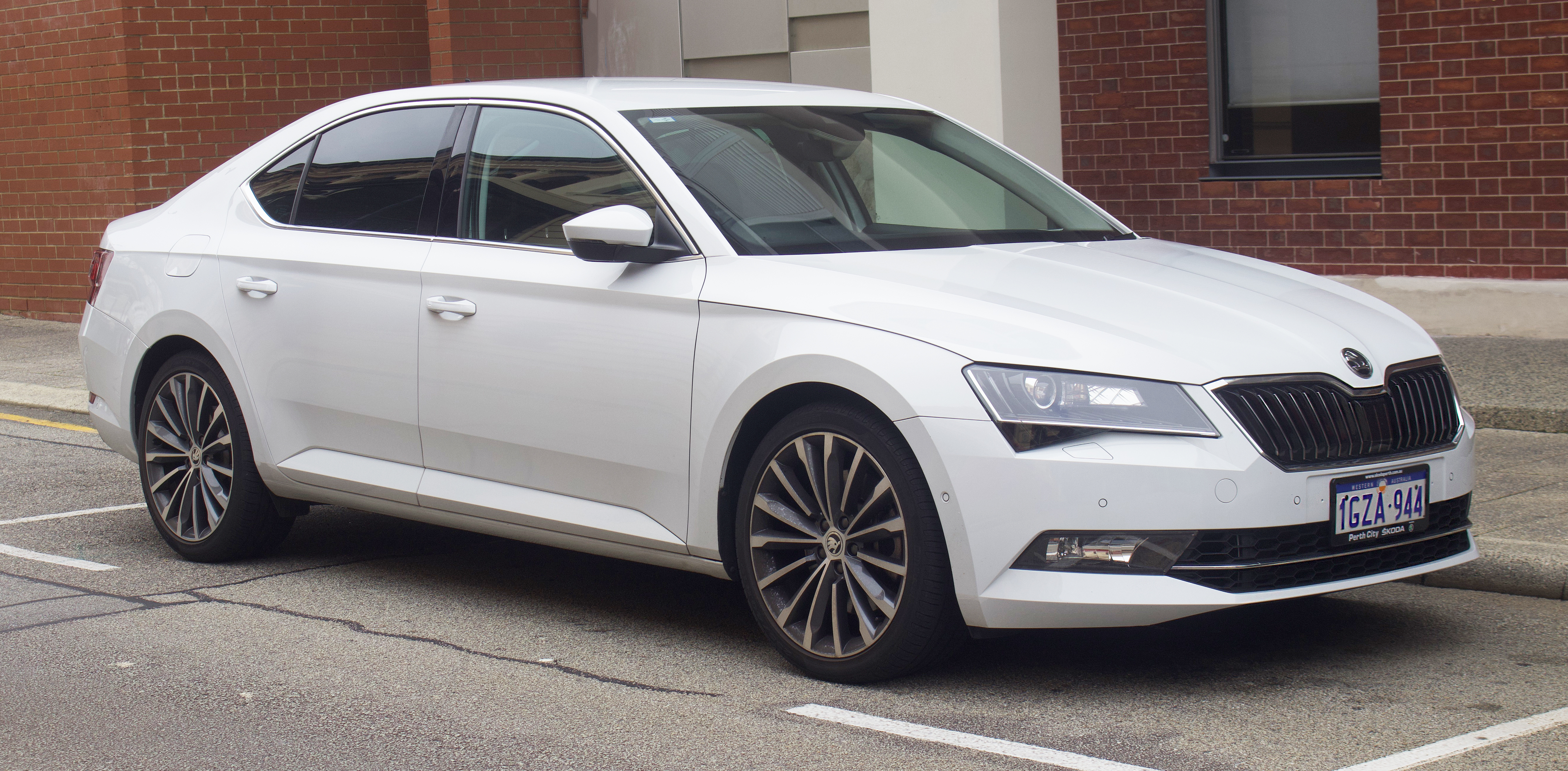
- 2018 Škoda Superb (Australia)

Overview
- Model code: 3V
- Production: 2015–2024 (Global); 2016–2026 (China)
- Assembly: Czech Republic: Kvasiny (Škoda Auto Kvasiny); China: Nanjing (SVW); India: Aurangabad (Škoda India); Kazakhstan: Oskemen (AZIA AVTO); Ukraine: Solomonovo (SKD; Eurocar)
- Designer: Omer Halilhodžić, Dalibor Pantůček, Antti Savio

Body and chassis
- Body style: 5-door liftback 5-door estate
- Layout: Front-engine, front-wheel-drive or all-wheel-drive (4x4)
- Platform: Volkswagen Group MQB platform
- Related: Volkswagen Passat (B8); Volkswagen Arteon; Volkswagen Tiguan Mk2; Volkswagen Tayron; Škoda Kodiaq; SEAT Tarraco; Audi Q3 Mk2

Powertrain
- Engine: Petrol: 1.4 L CZDA, CZEA I4 turbo (2015–2018) (Regular); 1.5 L DADA, DPCA I4 turbo (2018–2021); 1.8 L CJSA, CJSC I4 turbo (2015–2018); 2.0 L CHHB, DKZA I4 turbo; Petrol PHEV: 1.4 L DGEB I4 turbo (iV PHEV); Diesel: 1.6 L DCXA, DCZA I4 turbo (diesel; 2015–2020); 2.0 L CRLB, DFEA, DDAA, DFCA, DFHA, DTUA I4 turbo
- Electric motor: 85 kW (116 PS; 114 hp) Permanent magnet AC synchronous motor
- Transmission: 6-speed manual 6-speed automatic (DSG); 7-speed automatic (DSG)
- Hybrid drivetrain: PHEV (Superb iV PHEV)
- Battery: 13 kWh Li-ion

Dimensions
- Wheelbase: 2,841 mm (111.9 in)
- Length: 4,861 mm (191.4 in)
- Width: 1,864 mm (73.4 in)
- Height: 1,468 mm (57.8 in)

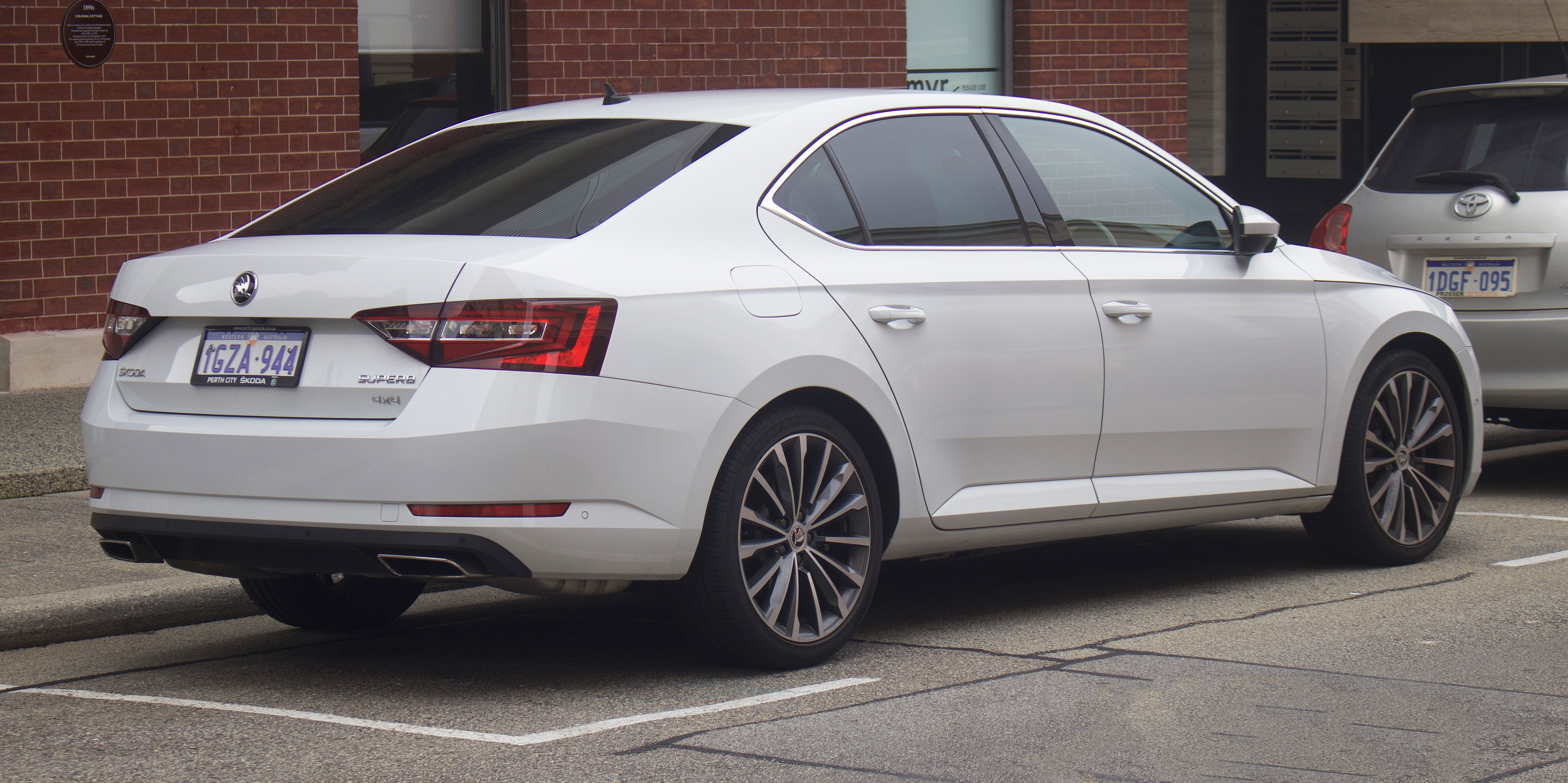
Rear view (liftback)

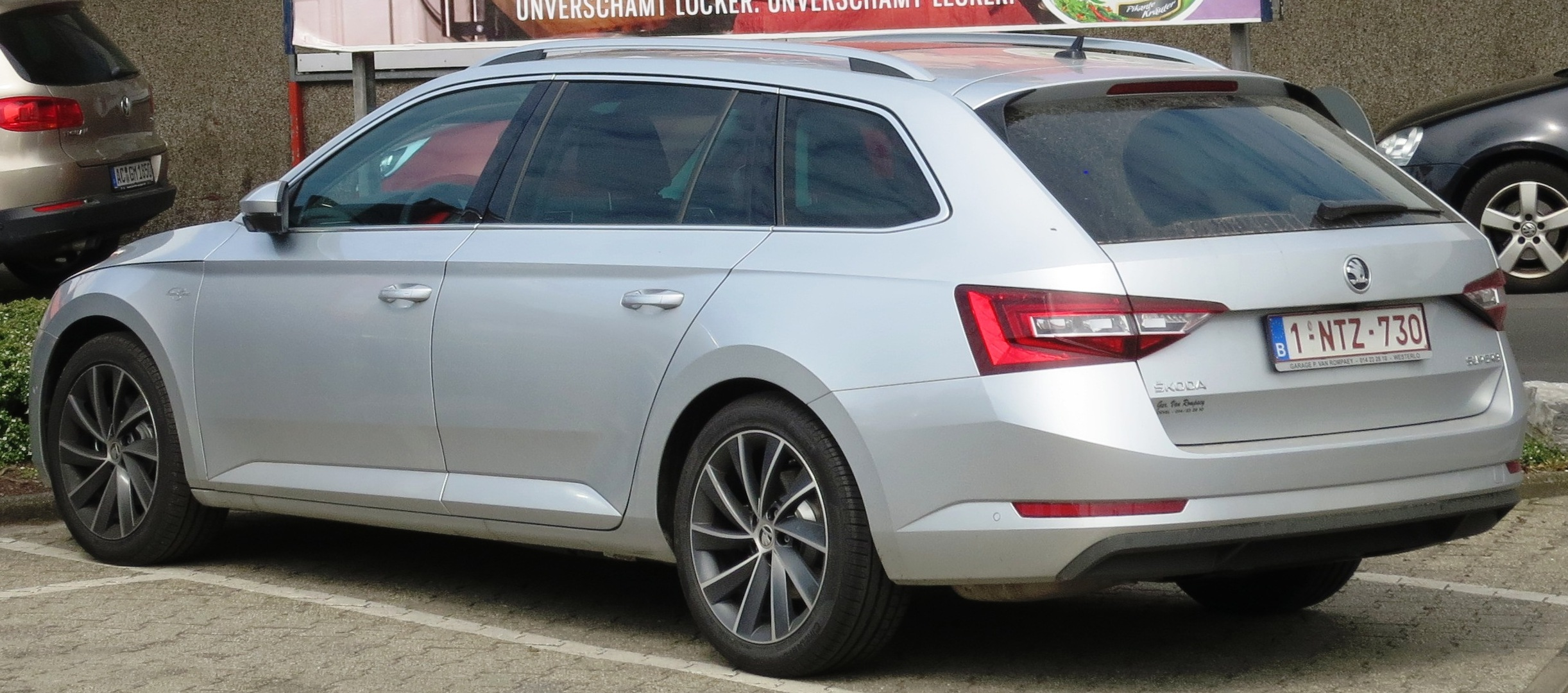
Škoda Superb III Combi

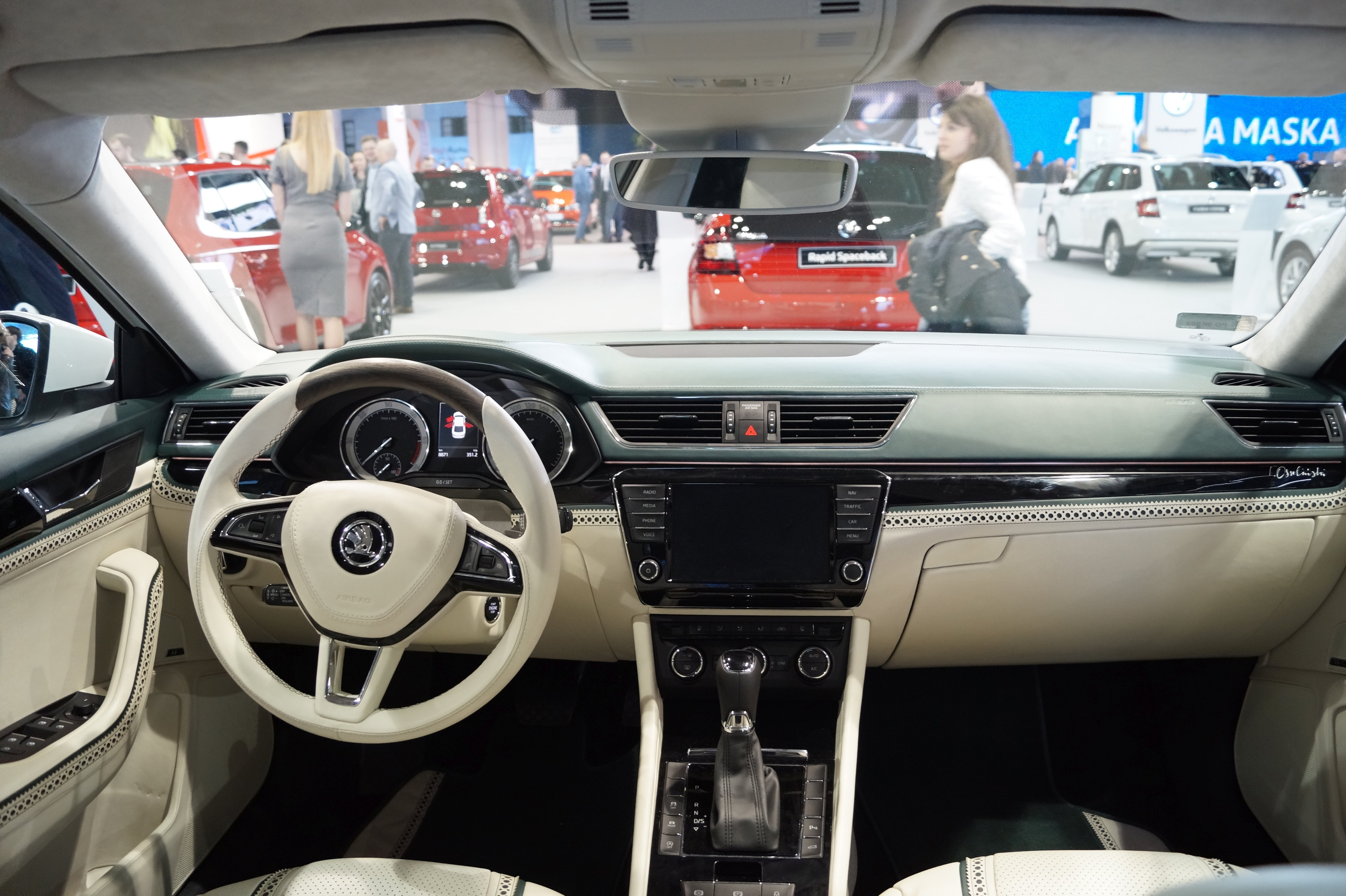
Interior

The third generation Superb, based on the Volkswagen Group MQB platform also used by other Volkswagen Group cars, including the Volkswagen Passat (B8), Volkswagen Arteon, Volkswagen Tiguan Mk2, Volkswagen Tayron, Škoda Kodiaq, SEAT Tarraco and Audi Q3 Mk2, was unveiled in February 2015 at the 2015 Geneva Motor Show, with volume production intended to start in the middle of the year. The car was first previewed by a concept car called the Škoda Vision C that was debuted in the 2014 Geneva Motor Show.

The new model is larger than the second generation. The Škoda Superb appeared in the Tour de France as a Referee car.

The new generation of direct injection turbocharged engines consisting of four cylinder units, was to include five petrol engines ranging in size from 1.4 to 2.0 litres, and three diesels of 1.6 or 2.0 litres. The Superb 2.0 TSI 4x4 200 kW (268 hp) is currently Škoda's fastest production car, with a top speed drive by 249 km/h (155 mph) and acceleration of 0–100 km/h (0–62 mph) in 5.5 seconds.

Dealer deliveries of the sedan began in June 2015, with the station wagon followed in September.

In the United Kingdom, the trim levels available were named the 'S', 'SE', 'SE Technology', 'SE L Executive', 'SportLine' and 'Laurin & Klement', with Laurin & Klement being top of the range. As of 2016, price ranges from £19,060, to the most luxurious L&K trim with all equipment for £42,385.

=== Selected acknowledgements ===
The Superb received very positive reviews in all foreign tests. British newspaper The Telegraph rated the new Superb with an overall rating of 9/10, Autocar 4/5, Top Gear 8/10, Auto Express 5/5, and in the German magazine Auto Bild, the Superb received 588 points. The Superb has also scored highly in Australia, where Car Advice awarded an overall rating of 9/10 highlighting key areas of value for money, features, performance and cabin space where the car has excelled. The Superb also defeated its rivals, in AutoBild test the Mercedes-Benz E-Class (E220 CDI) and in Auto Express the Volkswagen Passat 2.0 TDI.

The Škoda Superb was also awarded the title of Car of the Year in the Czech Republic and in Macedonia.

It also became the 2016 World Car of the Year finalist, the best compact executive car and estate car in 2016 on What Car? and the Auto Express Family Car of the Year 2016.

In January 2021, the Skoda Superb Estate 2.0 TDI 150 SE L was named Estate Car of the Year by What Car? magazine. What Car? awarded the Superb Estate five stars out of five in its review of the car.

=== Facelift ===
In May 2019, the facelifted Škoda Superb was unveiled in Bratislava. Škoda has added matrix full-LED headlights, Predictive Cruise Control and Emergency Assist.

The first plug-in hybrid was also introduced, the new Škoda Superb iV will be available with turbocharged 1.4-litre petrol engine, outputs is rated at 160 kW (215 hp) and has an all-electric range of up to 55 kilometres (34 mi). The new Škoda Superb Scout brings with its taller suspension and underbody protection a little bit of off-road ability. The facelifted car went on sale in early 2020.

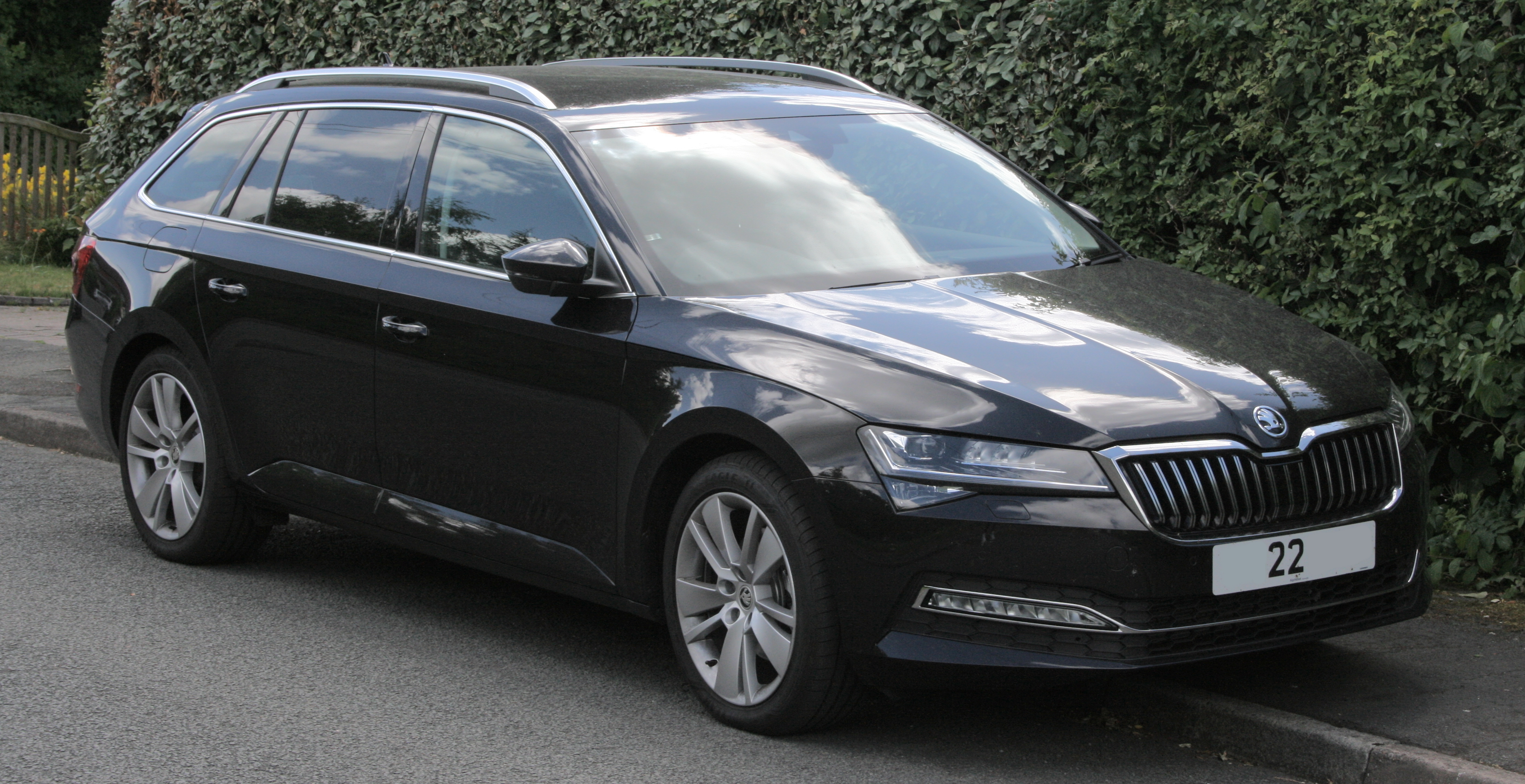
Škoda Superb Combi (Facelift)

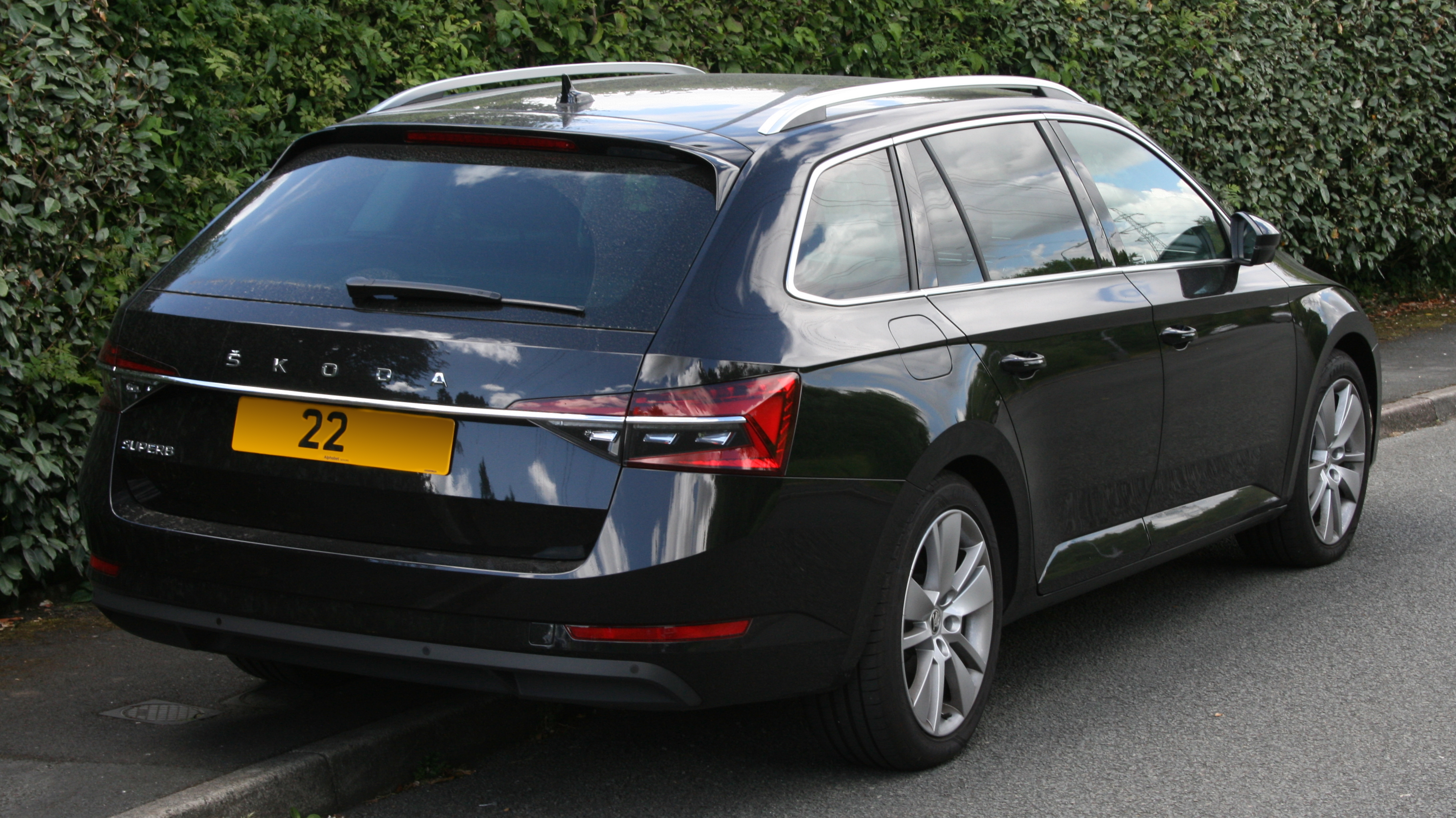
Rear view (facelift)

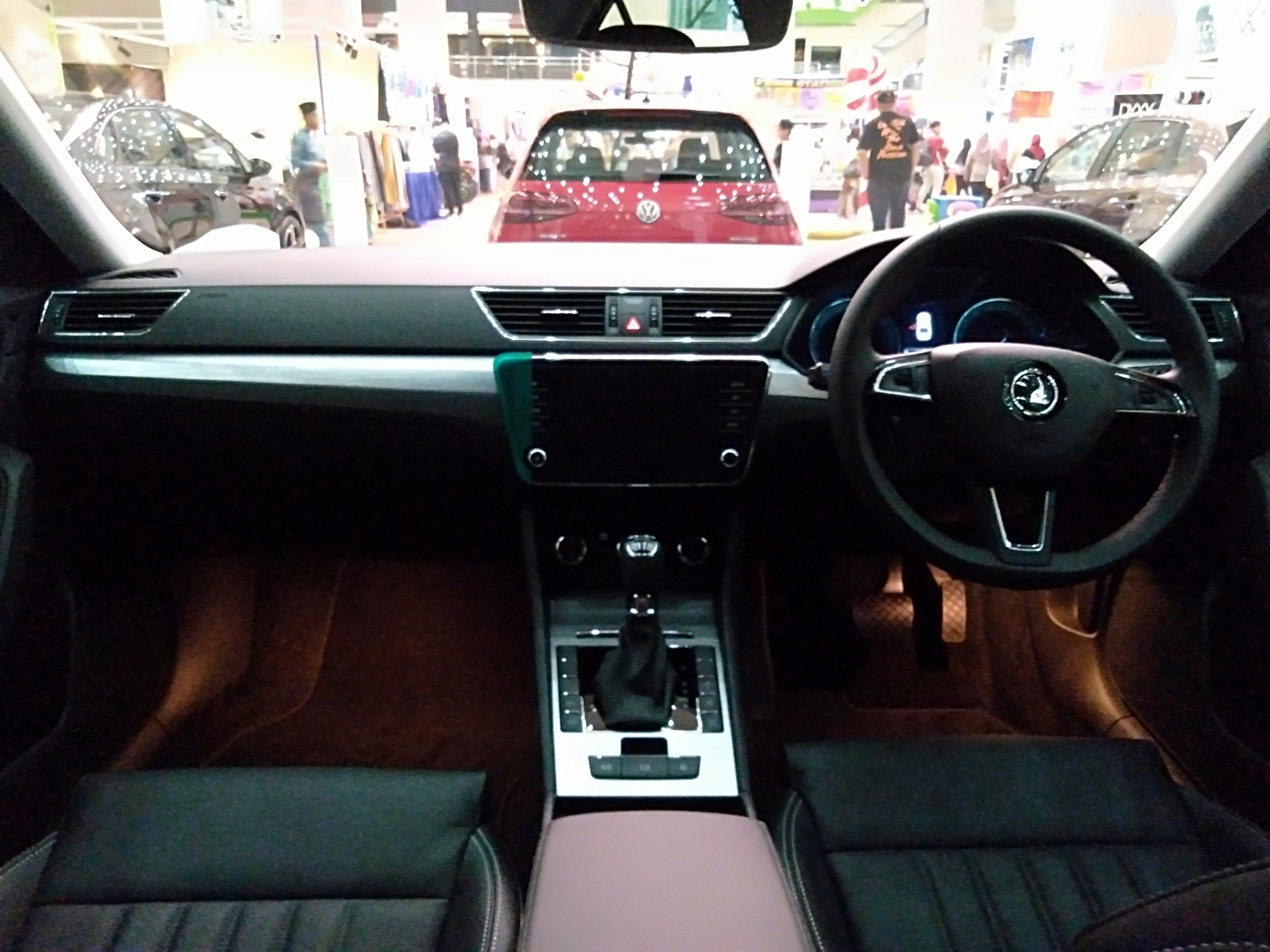
Interior (facelift)

=== Engines ===
Engine specifications:

Petrol engines
Model	Engine	Power	Torque	Gearbox	Top speed	0–100 km/h (0-62 mph)	
1.4 TSI*	1,395 cc (85.1 cu in)	92 kW (123 hp)	200 N⋅m (148 lb⋅ft)	6-speed manual	208 km/h (129 mph)	9.9 s	
1.4 TSI	1,395 cc (85.1 cu in)	110 kW (148 hp)	250 N⋅m (184 lb⋅ft)	6-speed manual / 7-speed DSG	220 km/h (137 mph)	8.6 s	
1.4 TSI 4x4	1,395 cc (85.1 cu in)	110 kW (148 hp)	250 N⋅m (184 lb⋅ft)	6-speed manual	215 km/h (134 mph)	9.0 s	
1.5 TSI	1,498 cc (91.4 cu in)	110 kW (148 hp)	250 N⋅m (184 lb⋅ft)	6-speed manual	217 km/h (135 mph)	8.7 s	
1.5 TSI	1,498 cc (91.4 cu in)	110 kW (148 hp)	250 N⋅m (184 lb⋅ft)	7-speed DSG	216 km/h (134 mph)	8.9 s	
1.8 TSI	1,798 cc (109.7 cu in)	132 kW (177 hp)	320 N⋅m (236 lb⋅ft)	6-speed manual	232 km/h (144 mph)	8.0 s	
1.8 TSI DSG	1,798 cc (109.7 cu in)	132 kW (177 hp)	250 N⋅m (184 lb⋅ft)	7-speed DSG	230 km/h (143 mph)	8.2 s	
2.0 TSI DSG	1,984 cc (121.1 cu in)	140 kW (188 hp)	320 N⋅m (236 lb⋅ft)	7-speed DSG	232 km/h (144 mph)	7.8 s	
2.0 TSI	1,984 cc (121.1 cu in)	162 kW (217 hp)	350 N⋅m (258 lb⋅ft)	6/7-speed DSG	245 km/h (152 mph)	7.0 s	
2.0 TSI 4x4	1,984 cc (121.1 cu in)	206 kW (276 hp)	400 N⋅m (295 lb⋅ft)	6/7-speed DSG	250 km/h (155 mph)	5.8 s	
2.0 TSI 4x4	1,984 cc (121.1 cu in)	200 kW (268 hp)	350 N⋅m (258 lb⋅ft)	7-speed DSG	250 km/h (155 mph)	5.5 s	
Diesel engines
Model	Engine	Power	Torque	Gearbox	Top speed	0–100 km/h (0-62 mph)	
1.6 TDI*	1,598 cc (97.5 cu in)	88 kW (118 hp)	250 N⋅m (184 lb⋅ft)	6-speed manual	206 km/h (128 mph)	10.9 s	
2.0 TDI	1,968 cc (120.1 cu in)	110 kW (148 hp)	340 N⋅m (251 lb⋅ft)	6-speed manual / 6/7-speed DSG	220 km/h (137 mph)	8.8 s	
2.0 TDI (4x4)	1,968 cc (120.1 cu in)	110 kW (148 hp)	340 N⋅m (251 lb⋅ft)	6-speed manual	215 km/h (134 mph)	9.0 s	
2.0 TDI	1,968 cc (120.1 cu in)	140 kW (188 hp)	400 N⋅m (295 lb⋅ft)	6-speed manual / 6/7-speed DSG	237 km/h (147 mph)	8.0 s	
2.0 TDI (4x4)	1,968 cc (120.1 cu in)	140 kW (188 hp)	400 N⋅m (295 lb⋅ft)	6/7-speed DSG	230 km/h (143 mph)	7.6 s	
2.0 TDI (4x4)	1,968 cc (120.1 cu in)	147 kW (197 hp)	400 N⋅m (295 lb⋅ft)	7-speed DSG	237 km/h (147 mph)	7.2 s	
PHEV engines
Model	Engine	Power	Torque	Gearbox	Top speed	0–100 km/h (0-62 mph)	Battery
1.4 TSI*	1,395 cc (85.1 cu in)	115 kW (154 hp) (engine); 85 kW (114 hp) (engine); 160 kW (215 hp) (combined)	250 N⋅m (184 lb⋅ft) (engine); 400 N⋅m (295 lb⋅ft) (combined)	6-speed DSG	225 km/h (140 mph)	7.1 s (6.7 s)	13 kWh

* Since September 2016, the 1.4 TSI (92 kW) and 1.6 TDI (88 kW) engines were no longer available, leaving 110 kW as the weakest engines.

* Since Model Year 2017, Škoda began equipping the 2.0 Litre 150hp Diesel and Petrol Superb with DQ381 DSG Gearboxes. Since Model Year 2018, the gearboxes were featured on the 2.0 Litre Diesel and Petrol Superb with 190hp. These gearboxes replaced the previously used DQ250 6-Speed "wet" dual-clutch gearbox. The newer DQ381 is a "wet" dual-clutch 7-Speed Gearbox. Since 2021, Skoda began equipping the 2.0 Litre 4x4 petrol-engined models with the EA888 Evo4 engine, engine code DNFE which increased output back up to 206kW.

=== Safety ===
Euro NCAP test results* Škoda Superb (2015)
Test	Points	%
Overall:	5 /5 stars	
Adult occupant:	32.7	86%
Child occupant:	42.2	86%
Pedestrian:	25.7	71%
Safety assist:	9.9	76%

ANCAP test results* Skoda Superb (2015, aligned with Euro NCAP)
Test	Points	%
Overall:	5 /5 stars	
Adult occupant:	32.7	86%
Child occupant:	42.2	86%
Pedestrian:	25.6	71%
Safety assist:	9.9	76%

== Fourth generation (B9, Typ 3Y; 2023) ==
Fourth generation B9
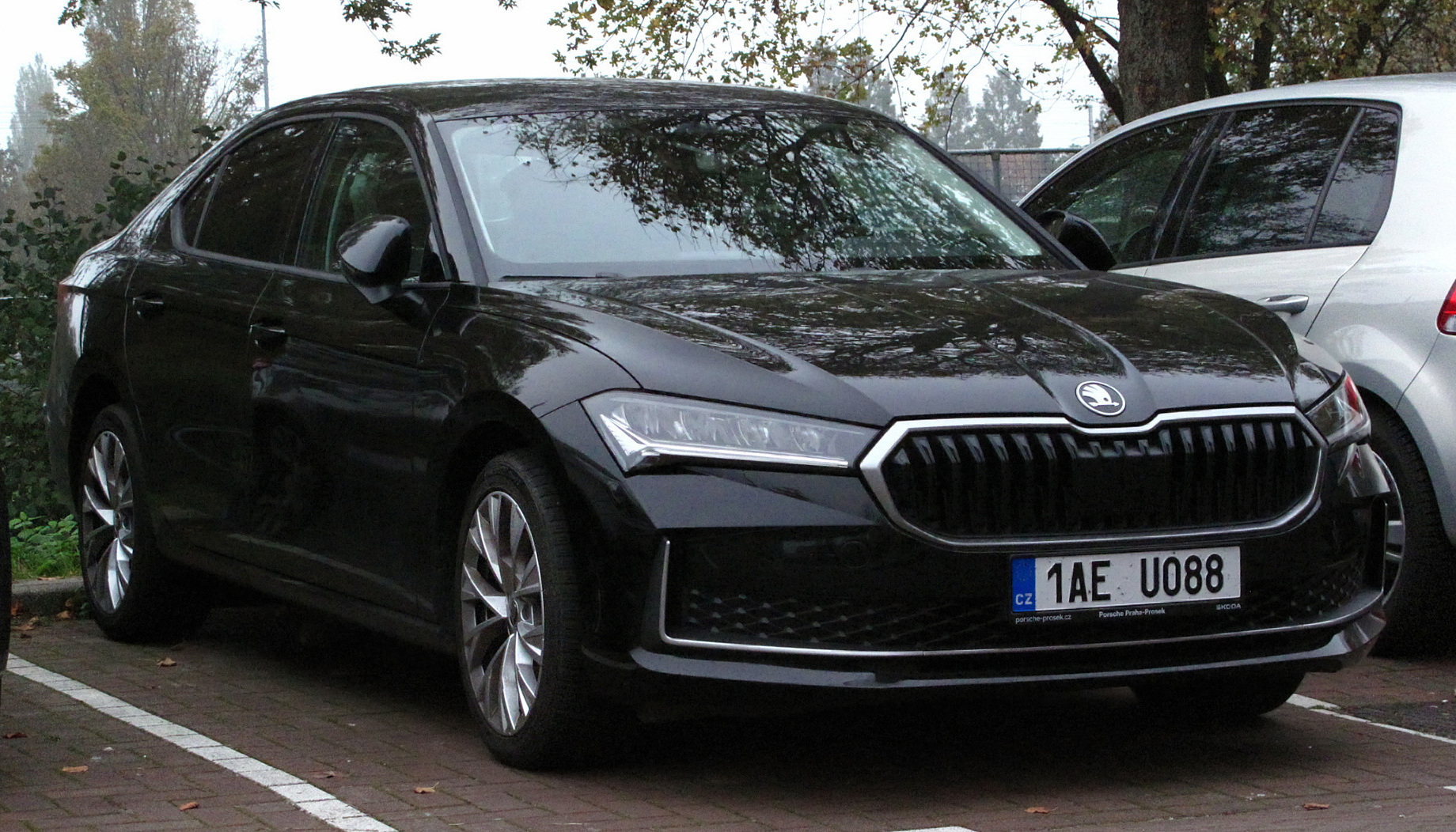
- 2024 Škoda Superb

Overview
- Model code: 3Y
- Production: December 2023–present
- Assembly: Slovakia: Bratislava

Body and chassis
- Body style: 5-door liftback 5-door estate
- Layout: Front-engine, front-wheel-drive, Front-engine, all-wheel-drive
- Platform: Volkswagen Group MQB Evo
- Related: Volkswagen Passat (B9)

Powertrain
- Engine: Petrol: 1.5 L TSI I4 mild hybrid; 2.0 L TSI I4; Petrol plug-in hybrid: 1.5 L TSI I4 (Superb iV); Diesel: 2.0 L TDI I4
- Transmission: 6-speed DSG (Superb iV); 7-speed DSG
- Hybrid drivetrain: PHEV
- Battery: 25.7 kWh Li-NMC (Superb iV)
- Electric range: 100 km (62 mi) (Superb iV)

Dimensions
- Wheelbase: 2,841 mm (111.9 in)
- Length: 4,904 mm (193.1 in) (liftback); 4,901 mm (193.0 in) (estate)
- Width: 1,849 mm (72.8 in)
- Height: 1,480 mm (58.3 in) (liftback); 1,473 mm (58.0 in) (estate)

The fourth-generation Superb was officially unveiled on 2 November 2023. The model is offered as an estate and a liftback. It shares the same body panels and greenhouse with the Volkswagen Passat B9. Both the Passat B9 and the Superb Mk4 are offered with petrol, diesel and plug-in hybrid engine options, and are the first passenger vehicles of the Volkswagen Group to be based on a stretched version of the MQB Evo platform. Unlike its predecessor, a manual option will not be available.

=== Design ===
The fourth-generation Superb features the brand's new "Modern Solid" design language "characterised by sharply drawn lines, clearly defined dynamic proportions and a modern sculptural and crystalline styling." Compared to its predecessor, it has a 10% and 15% reduction in drag coefficient for the liftback and Combi models respectively.

The front has the second-generation LED Matrix beam headlights with new Crystallinium, new octagonal grille finished in unique dark chrome, the Škoda logo on the bonnet and the air curtains inside the front bumper. The side has a bodyline that runs from the front lights to the rear lights. The rear has Škoda lettering on tailgate finished in unique dark chrome, Crystalline-designed LED taillights with animated lighting features and the Combi has an extended rear spoiler with side finlets. The taillights are the only design element on the rear that both the liftback and Combi models have in common.

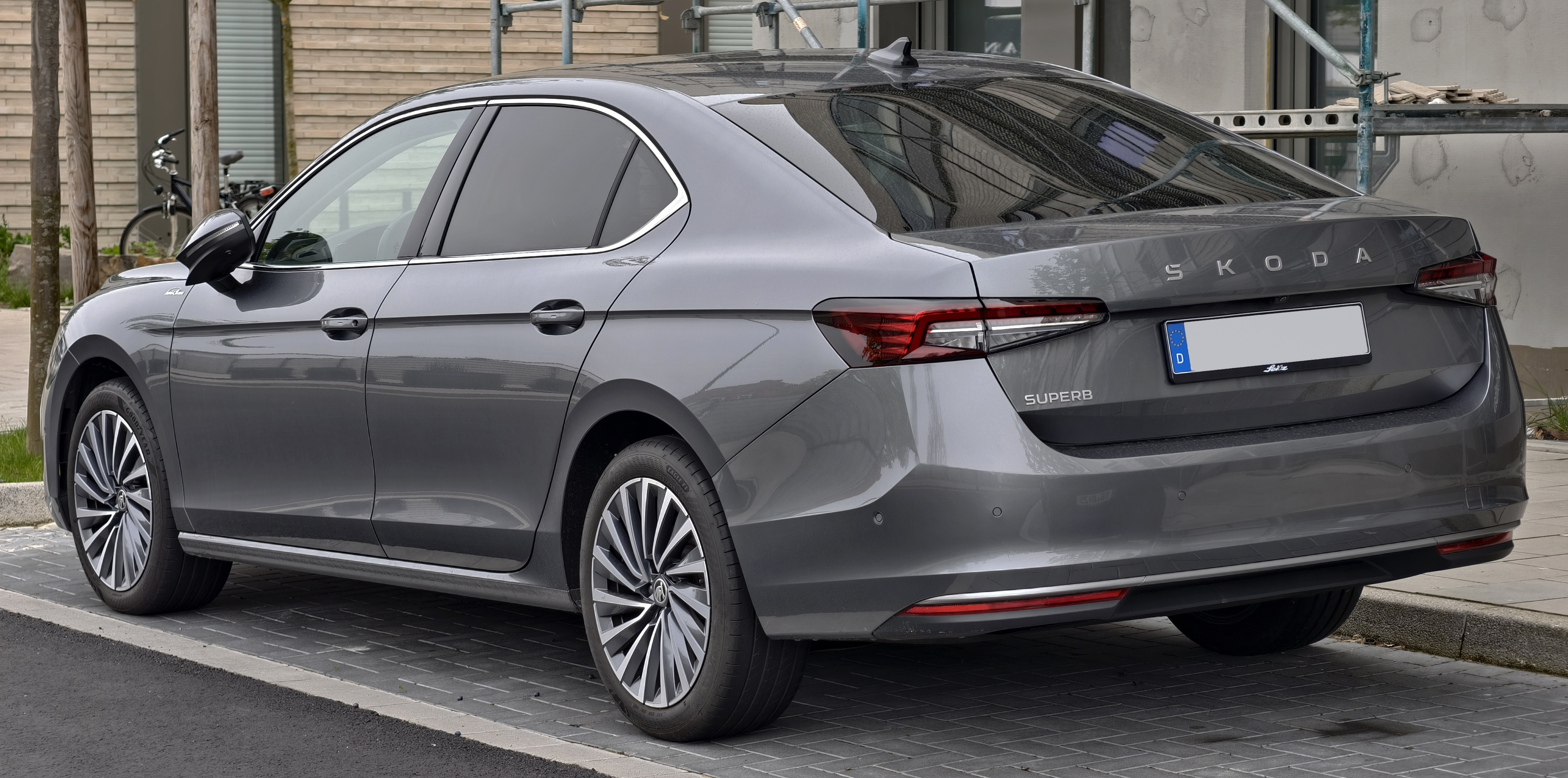
Rear view

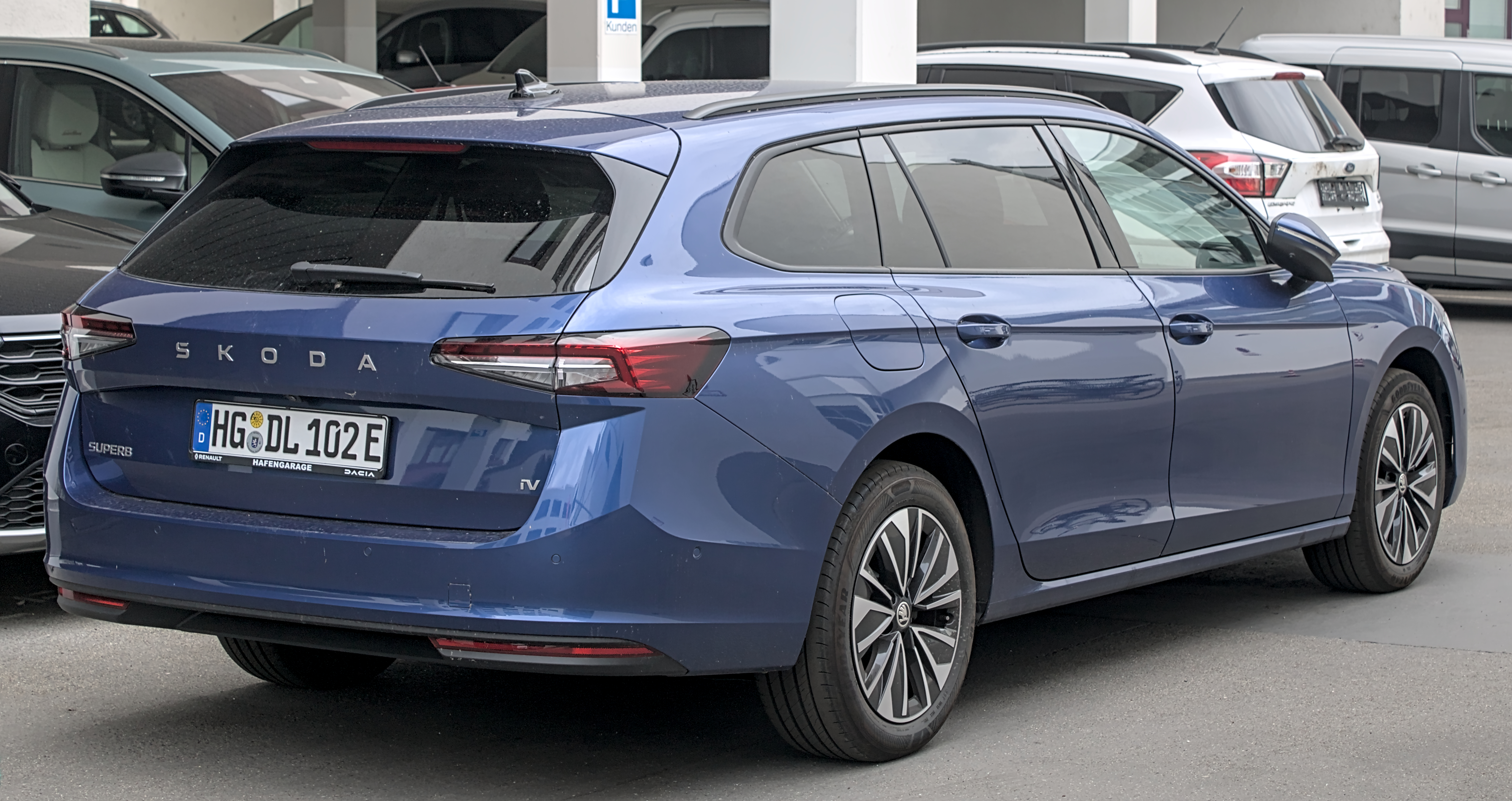
Combi

=== Interior ===
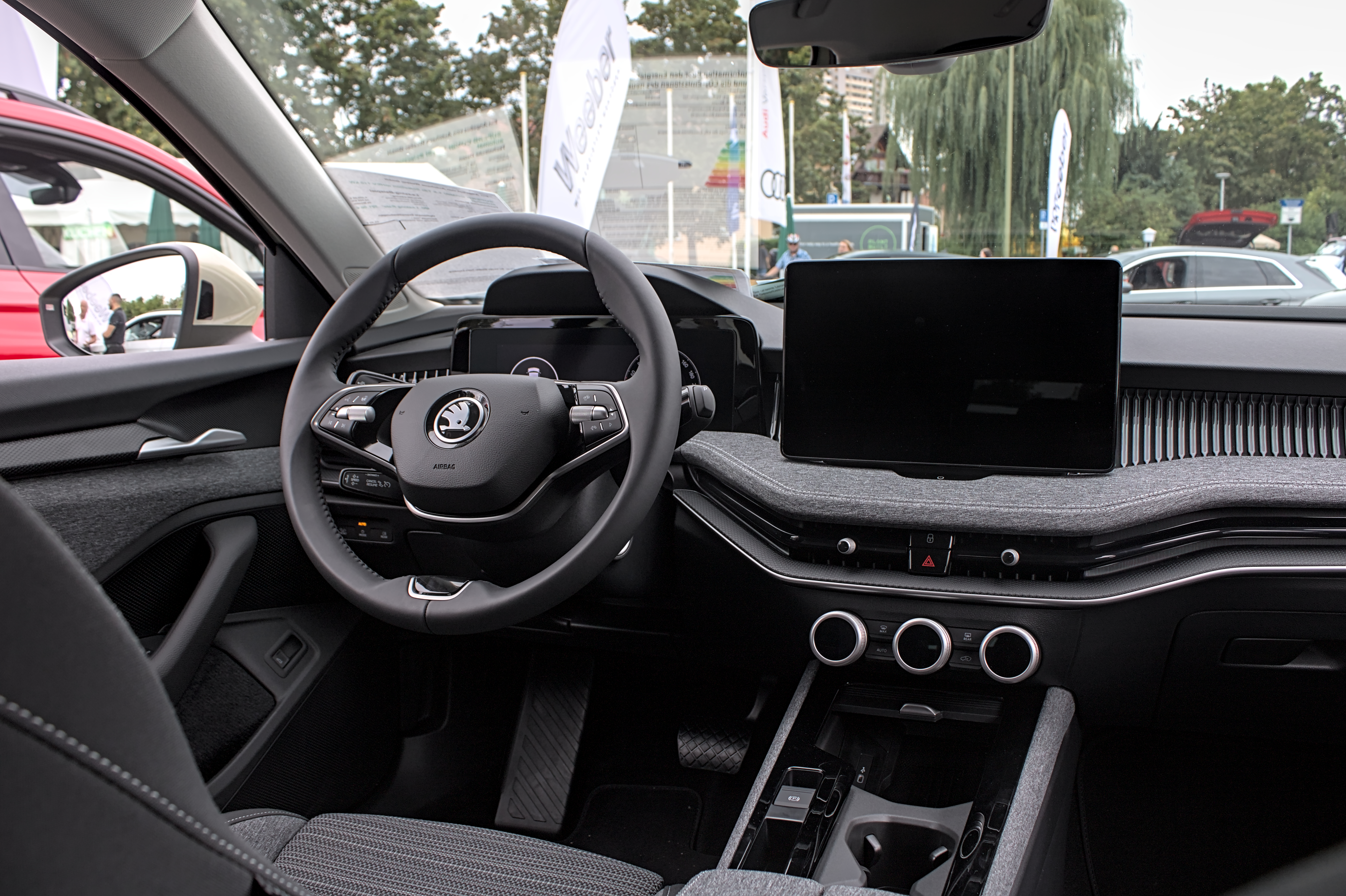
Interior

The interior has a 10.25-inch Virtual Cockpit digital driver's display, 10-inch touchscreen infotainment system (which can be upgraded to a larger 13-inch screen), Smart Dials with three rotary dials used to operate the drive modes, HVAC system and volume, and the gear selector is mounted on the steering wheel column. All textile materials used are made from 100% recyclable materials, and the ‘cognac’ brown leather option is tanned using waste water from olive processing.

There is a total of twenty-eight Simply Clever features such as a Jumbo Box with a 5.5 L (0.19 cu ft) storage space underneath the armrest, Phone Box wireless charging slot with a cooling function, and an umbrella stored inside the driver's door. Other interior features includes a 14-speaker Canton surround sound system, Ergo seats with 10-point massage function, and a heads-up display available for the first time on the Superb. The liftback and Combi models has a boot space of 645 L (22.8 cu ft) and 690 L (24 cu ft) respectively, which can expand to 1,920 L (68 cu ft) on the Combi model when the rear seats are folded.

=== Engines ===
Petrol engines
Model	Engine	Power	Torque	Top speed		0–100 km/h (0–62 mph)	
Model	Engine	Power	Torque	Liftback	Combi	Liftback	Combi
1.5 TSI mHEV	1.5 L (1,498 cc)	110 kW (148 hp)	250 N⋅m (184 lb⋅ft)	225 km/h (140 mph)		9.2 s	9.3 s
2.0 TSI 4x4	2.0 L (1,984 cc)	195 kW (261 hp)	400 N⋅m (295 lb⋅ft)	250 km/h (155 mph)		5.6 s	5.7 s
Diesel engines							
2.0 TDI	2.0 L (1,968 cc)	110 kW (148 hp)	360 N⋅m (266 lb⋅ft)	225 km/h (140 mph)	222 km/h (138 mph)	9.2 s	9.3 s
2.0 TDI 4x4	2.0 L (1,968 cc)	142 kW (190 hp)	400 N⋅m (295 lb⋅ft)	238 km/h (148 mph)	230 km/h (143 mph)	7.5 s	7.6 s
PHEV engines
1.5 TSI iV	1.5 L (1,498 cc)	150 PS (110 kW; 148 hp) (engine) 115 PS (85 kW; 113 hp) (electric motor) 204 PS (150 kW; 201 hp) (combined)	250 N⋅m (184 lb⋅ft) (engine) 330 N⋅m (243 lb⋅ft) (electric motor) 350 N⋅m (258 lb⋅ft) (combined)	—N/a	220 km/h (137 mph)	—N/a	8.1 s

=== Safety ===
The fourth-generation Superb achieved a 5-star Euro NCAP safety rating, with its results were applied from the Volkswagen Passat B9 as both vehicles have a similar body structure.

ANCAP test results Skoda Superb (2024, aligned with Euro NCAP)
Test	Points	%
Overall:	5 /5 stars	
Adult occupant:	37.29	93%
Child occupant:	42.41	86%
Pedestrian:	51.82	82%
Safety assist:	15.42	85%

== Sales ==
Year	Production
2001	581
2002	24,305
2003	19,270
2004	22,899
2005	21,182
2006	20,403
2007	21,339
2008	27,264
2009	52,361
2010	105,709
2011	119,732
2012	106,847
2013	96,226
2014	82,079
2015	84,550
2016	148,880
2017	147,103
2018	136,985
2019	102,592
2020	80,880
2021	57,720
2022	64,780
2023	71,062
2024	72,800
