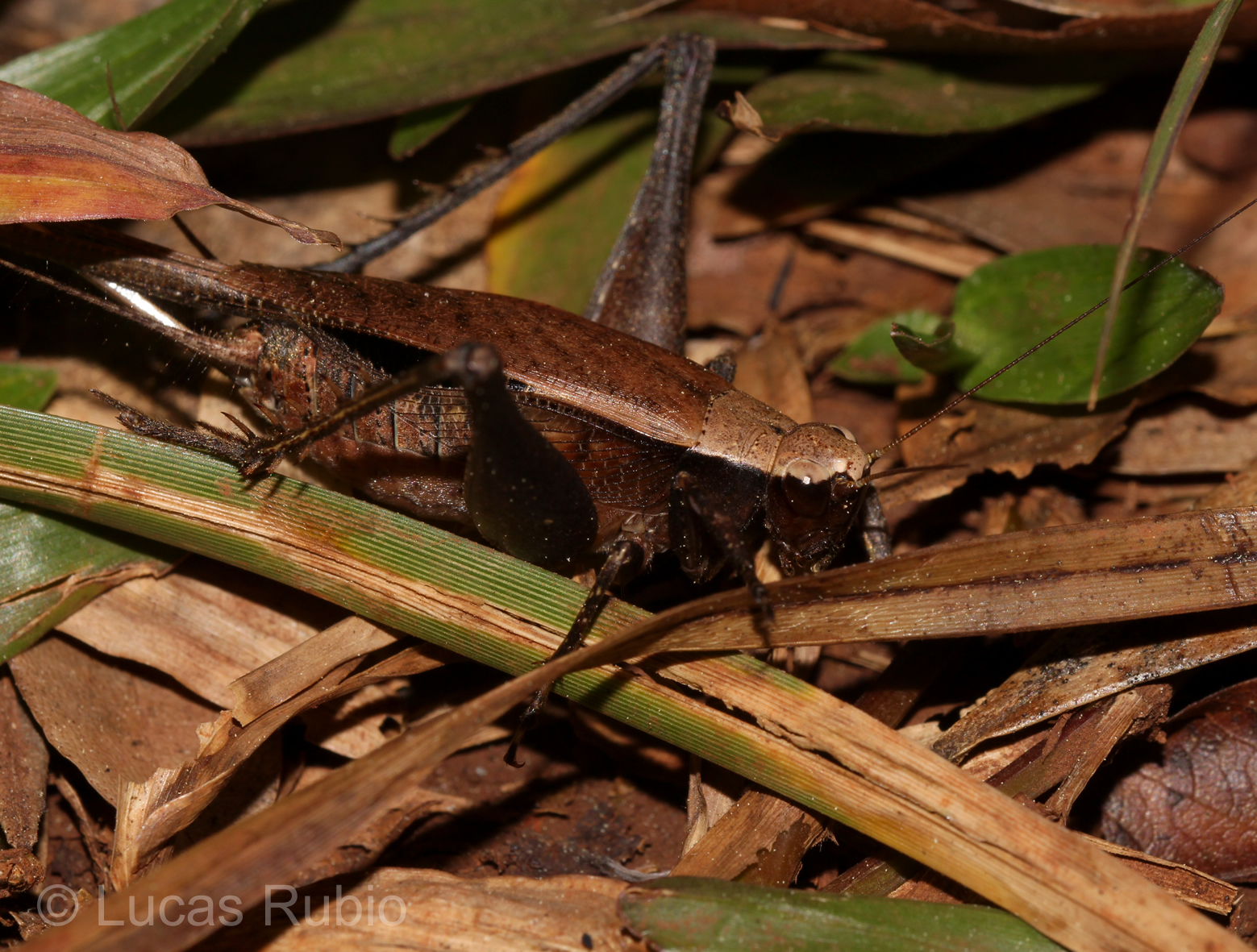

Scientific classification
- Kingdom: Animalia
- Phylum: Arthropoda
- Class: Insecta
- Order: Orthoptera
- Suborder: Ensifera
- Family: Gryllidae
- Genus: Eneoptera
- Species: E. surinamensis

Binomial name
- Eneoptera surinamensis (De Geer, 1773)

= Eneoptera surinamensis =

Species of insect

Eneoptera surinamensis is a species of cricket from the genus Eneoptera. The species was originally described by Charles De Geer in 1773

== Description ==
Eneoptera surinamensis is a tropical forest cricket, which lives in open areas of rain forest Like its fellow members of the subfamily Eneopterinae, E. surinamensis eat leaves, flowers and fruits of living plants. They deposit their eggs in pith, bark, or soft wood of plant stems.

Call of the Eneoptera surinamensis.

== Ecology ==
Because of the species feeding on leaves, flowers and fruits of living plants, they occasionally damage plants of value to humans.
