= Bush cricket =

Bush cricket may refer to:

- Tettigoniidae, an insect family known in British English as bush crickets
- Eneopterinae, a subfamily known in American English as bush crickets

== See also ==
- "The bush", "bush cricket"
