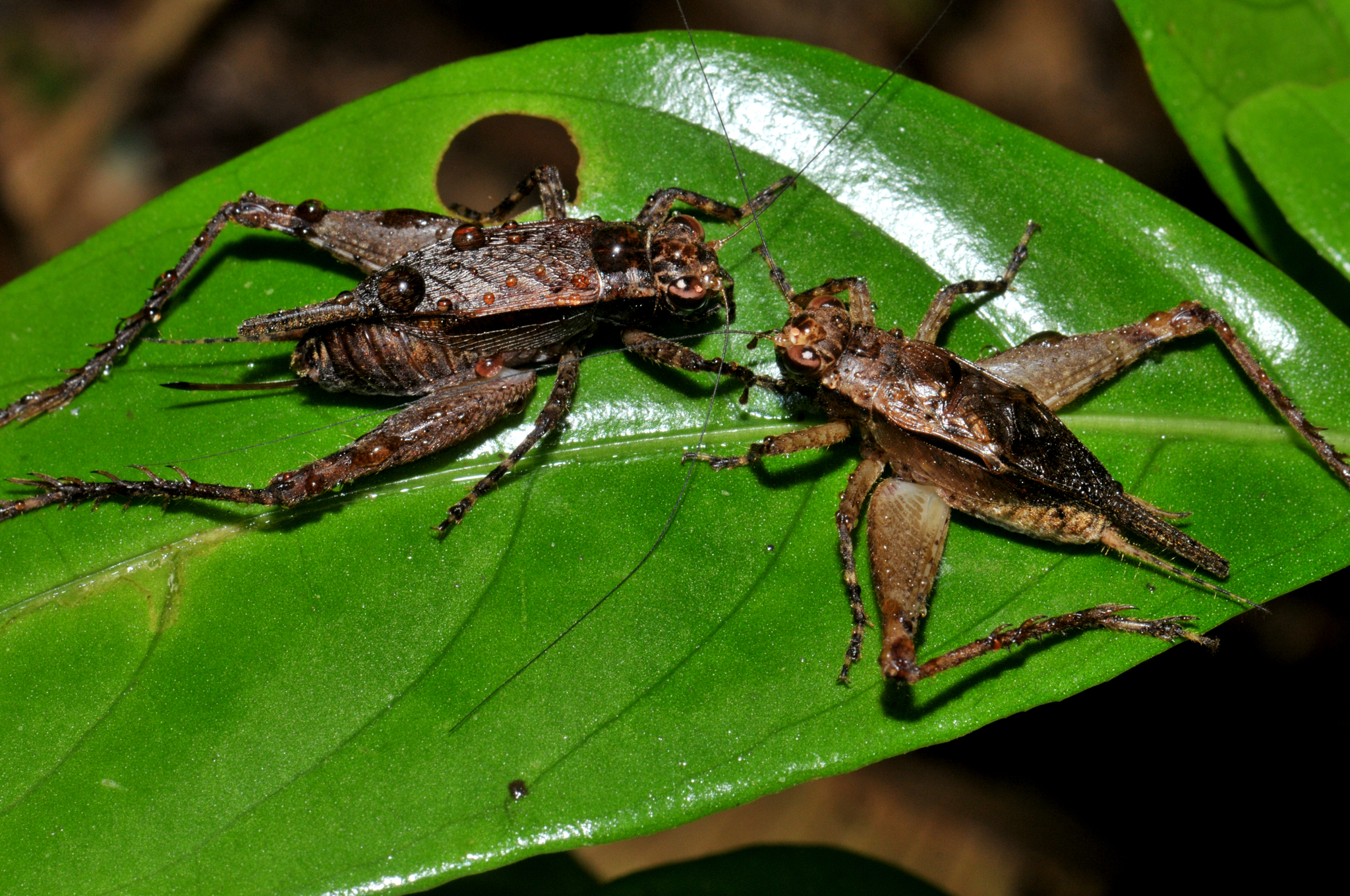
- Ponca hebardi

Scientific classification
- Kingdom: Animalia
- Phylum: Arthropoda
- Clade: Pancrustacea
- Class: Insecta
- Order: Orthoptera
- Suborder: Ensifera
- Family: Gryllidae
- Subfamily: Eneopterinae
- Tribe: Lebinthini
- Subtribe: Ligypterina
- Genus: Ponca; Hebard, 1928

Species
- Ponca hebardi Robillard, 2005; Ponca venosa Hebard, 1928

= Ponca (cricket) =

Genus of crickets

Ponca is a genus of crickets in the family Gryllidae.
