= Xenogryllus =

Scientific classification
- Domain: Eukaryota
- Kingdom: Animalia
- Phylum: Arthropoda
- Class: Insecta
- Order: Orthoptera
- Suborder: Ensifera
- Family: Gryllidae
- Subfamily: Eneopterinae
- Tribe: Xenogryllini
- Genus: Xenogryllus; Bolívar, 1890

Synonyms
- Dindymus Kirby, 1906; Dionymus Brunner von Wattenwyl, 1893

Genus of crickets

External image
- Images at iNaturalist

Xenogryllus is a genus of crickets (Orthoptera: Ensifera) in the family Gryllidae, subfamily Eneopterinae and tribe Xenogryllini. Species have been found in (mostly tropical) Africa and Asia (including India, Indo-China, China, Korea and Japan).

== Species ==
There are currently 8 described species in Xenogryllus:

1. Xenogryllus eneopteroides Bolívar, 1890 – type species (locality: Duque de Bragança (Calandula), Angola)
2. Xenogryllus lamottei Robillard, 2019
3. Xenogryllus maichauensis Gorochov, 1992
4. Xenogryllus maniema Robillard & Jaiswara, 2019
5. Xenogryllus marmoratus (Haan, 1844)
6. Xenogryllus mozambicus Robillard, 2019
7. Xenogryllus transversus (Walker, 1869)
8. Xenogryllus ululiu Gorochov, 1990
