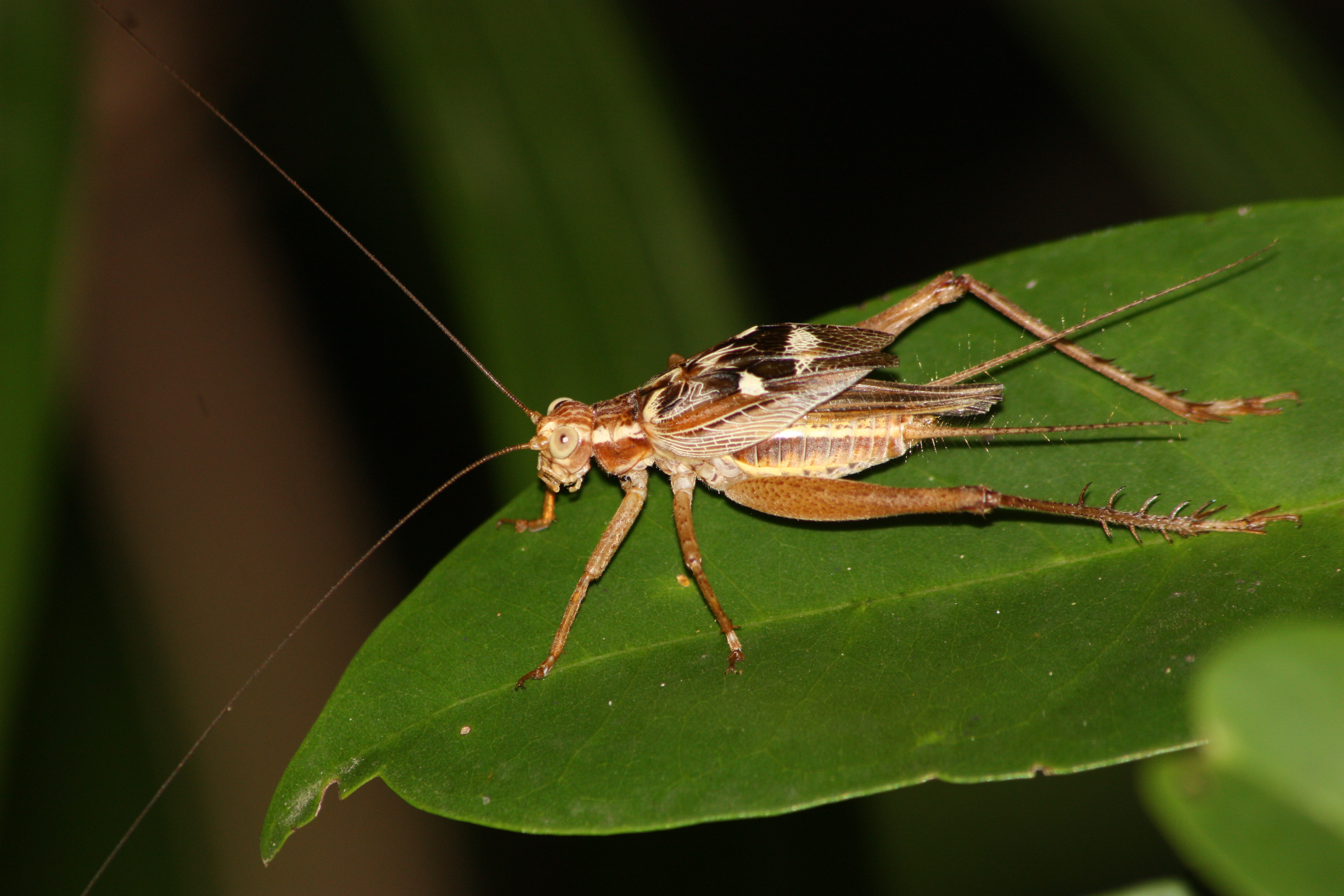
- Cardiodactylus novaeguineae male

Scientific classification
- Domain: Eukaryota
- Kingdom: Animalia
- Phylum: Arthropoda
- Class: Insecta
- Order: Orthoptera
- Suborder: Ensifera
- Family: Gryllidae
- Subfamily: Eneopterinae
- Tribe: Lebinthini
- Genus: Cardiodactylus; Saussure, 1878

Synonyms
- Orbega Walker, 1869

= Cardiodactylus =

Genus of crickets

Cardiodactylus is an Asian genus of crickets in the family Gryllidae, subfamily Eneopterinae and tribe Lebinthini.

== Species ==
Species have been recorded from: Japan, South-East Asia, Sri Lanka, Australia and western Pacific islands. The Orthoptera Species File lists:

- Cardiodactylus minuta Bhowmik, 1981
- Cardiodactylus nigris Bhowmik, 1981

species group Cardiodactylus (efordi) Otte, 2007

New Guinea region only

- Cardiodactylus busu Otte, 2007
- Cardiodactylus canotus Saussure, 1878
- Cardiodactylus efordi Otte, 2007
- Cardiodactylus enkraussi Otte, 2007
- Cardiodactylus javarere Otte, 2007
- Cardiodactylus kokure Otte, 2007
- Cardiodactylus kolombangara Otte, 2007
- Cardiodactylus kukugai Otte, 2007
- Cardiodactylus kuschei Otte, 2007
- Cardiodactylus lavella Otte, 2007
- Cardiodactylus mumurai Otte, 2007
- Cardiodactylus niugini Dong & Robillard, 2016
- Cardiodactylus nobilis Dong & Robillard, 2016
- Cardiodactylus pentecotensis Robillard, 2009
- Cardiodactylus pictus Saussure, 1878
- Cardiodactylus rufidulus Saussure, 1878
- Cardiodactylus shanahani Otte, 2007
- Cardiodactylus singuawa Otte, 2007
- Cardiodactylus tangtalau Otte, 2007
- Cardiodactylus togerao Otte, 2007
- Cardiodactylus wairahu Otte, 2007
- nomen nudum Cardiodactylus malangona Otte, 2007

species group Cardiodactylus (novaeguineae) (Haan, 1844)

- Cardiodactylus admirabilis Tan & Robillard, 2014
- Cardiodactylus aobaensis Robillard, 2009
- Cardiodactylus baitabensis Dong & Robillard, 2016
- Cardiodactylus borneoe Robillard & Gorochov, 2014
- Cardiodactylus brandti Otte, 2007
- Cardiodactylus bulolo Otte, 2007
- Cardiodactylus celebae Robillard, 2014
- Cardiodactylus cheesmani Otte, 2007
- Cardiodactylus contrarius Gorochov, 2014
- Cardiodactylus doloduo Gorochov, 2014
- Cardiodactylus empagatao Otte, 2007
- Cardiodactylus epiensis Robillard, 2009
- Cardiodactylus erniae Robillard & Gorochov, 2014
- Cardiodactylus esakii Otte, 2007
- Cardiodactylus floresiensis Robillard, 2014
- Cardiodactylus fruhstorferi Gorochov & Robillard, 2014
- Cardiodactylus gagnei Otte, 2007
- Cardiodactylus gaimardi (Serville, 1838)
- Cardiodactylus gressitti Otte, 2007
- Cardiodactylus guttulus (Matsumura, 1913)
- Cardiodactylus haanii Saussure, 1878
- Cardiodactylus haddocki Dong & Robillard, 2016
- Cardiodactylus halmahera Gorochov & Robillard, 2014
- Cardiodactylus hentownesi Otte, 2007
- Cardiodactylus jdoeria Robillard, 2014
- Cardiodactylus kondoi Otte, 2007
- Cardiodactylus kotandora Robillard, 2014
- Cardiodactylus kraussi Otte, 2007
- Cardiodactylus kusaiense Otte, 2007
- Cardiodactylus lampongsi Robillard & Gorochov, 2014
- Cardiodactylus loboe Robillard, 2014
- Cardiodactylus lombrinjani Robillard, 2014
- Cardiodactylus lucus Dong & Robillard, 2016
- Cardiodactylus maai Otte, 2007
- Cardiodactylus mamai Otte, 2007
- Cardiodactylus manus Otte, 2007
- Cardiodactylus muiri Otte, 2007
- Cardiodactylus murakami Otte, 2007
- Cardiodactylus muria Robillard, 2014
- Cardiodactylus novaeguineae (Haan, 1844)
  type species (as Gryllus novaeguineae Haan)
- Cardiodactylus obi Gorochov & Robillard, 2014
- Cardiodactylus oeroe Robillard, 2014
- Cardiodactylus palawan Gorochov, 2014
- Cardiodactylus pelagus Otte, 2007
- Cardiodactylus quatei Otte, 2007
- Cardiodactylus reticulatus Gorochov, 2014
- Cardiodactylus riga Otte, 2007
- Cardiodactylus rizali Robillard, 2014
- Cardiodactylus sedlaceki Otte, 2007
- Cardiodactylus singapura Robillard, 2011
- Cardiodactylus sumba Robillard, 2014
- Cardiodactylus talaudae Robillard, 2014
- Cardiodactylus tangkoko Gorochov, 2014
- Cardiodactylus tankara Robillard, 2009
- Cardiodactylus tello Robillard, 2014
- Cardiodactylus thailandia Robillard, 2011
- Cardiodactylus variegatus Gorochov & Robillard, 2014
- Cardiodactylus vella Otte, 2007
- nomen dubium Cardiodactylus praecipuus (Walker, 1869)
