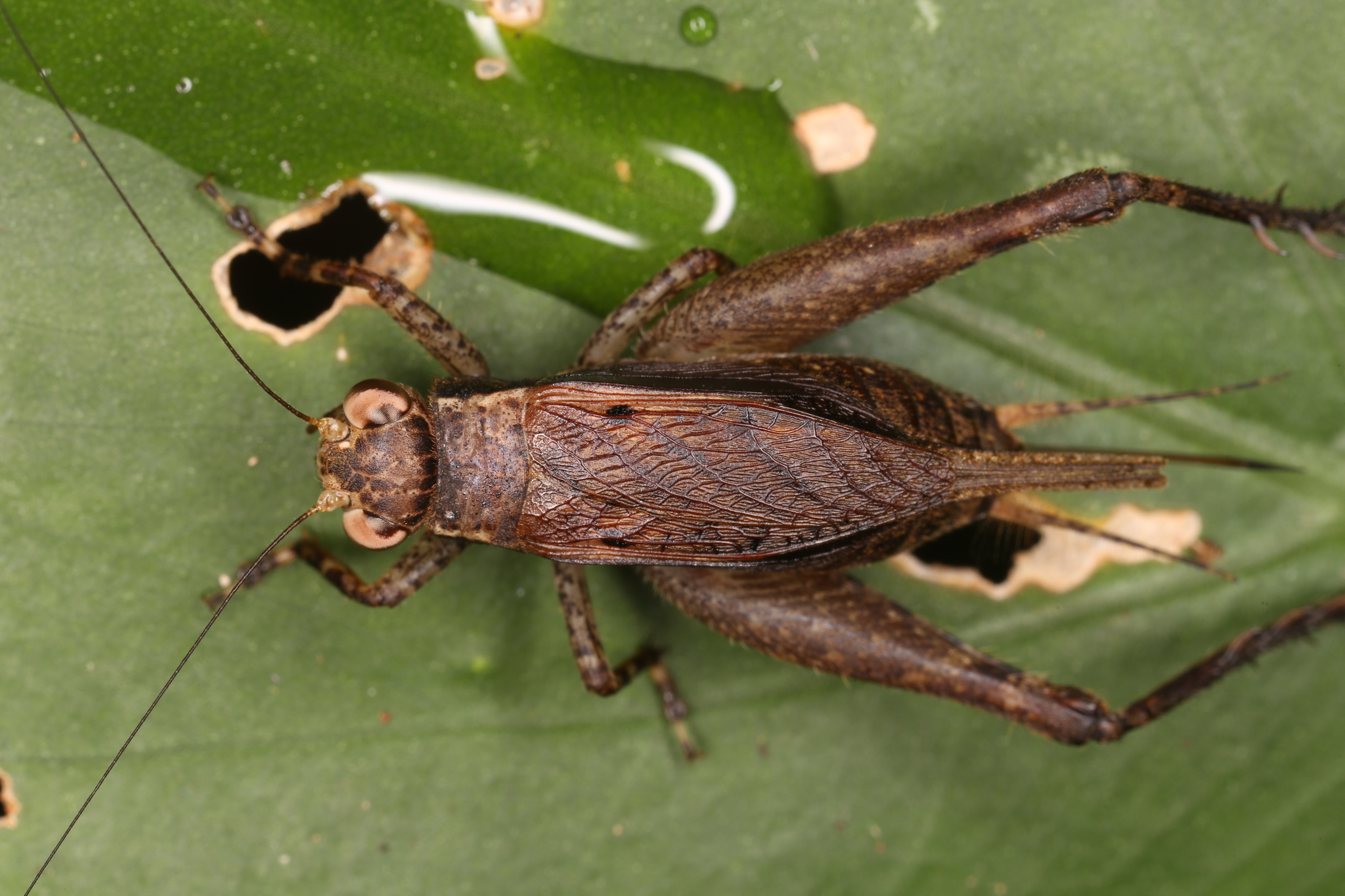

Scientific classification
- Kingdom: Animalia
- Phylum: Arthropoda
- Clade: Pancrustacea
- Class: Insecta
- Order: Orthoptera
- Suborder: Ensifera
- Family: Gryllidae
- Genus: Ponca
- Species: P. venosa

Binomial name
- Ponca venosa Hebard, 1928

= Ponca venosa =

Species of cricket

Ponca venosa is a species of cricket in the family Gryllidae.
