= Hemigryllus =

Scientific classification
- Domain: Eukaryota
- Kingdom: Animalia
- Phylum: Arthropoda
- Class: Insecta
- Order: Orthoptera
- Suborder: Ensifera
- Family: Gryllidae
- Subfamily: Eneopterinae
- Genus: Hemigryllus

Genus of crickets

Hemigryllus is a genus of crickets in subfamily Eneopterinae.

== Taxonomy ==
The Orthoptera Species File database lists the following species:

- Hemigryllus amazonicus Gorochov, 1997
- Hemigryllus columbi Gorochov, 1996
- Hemigryllus femineus Gorochov, 1986
- Hemigryllus ortonii (Scudder, 1869)
- Hemigryllus sharovi Gorochov, 1996
- Hemigryllus vocatus Gorochov, 1999
- Hemigryllus woronovi Gorochov, 1986
