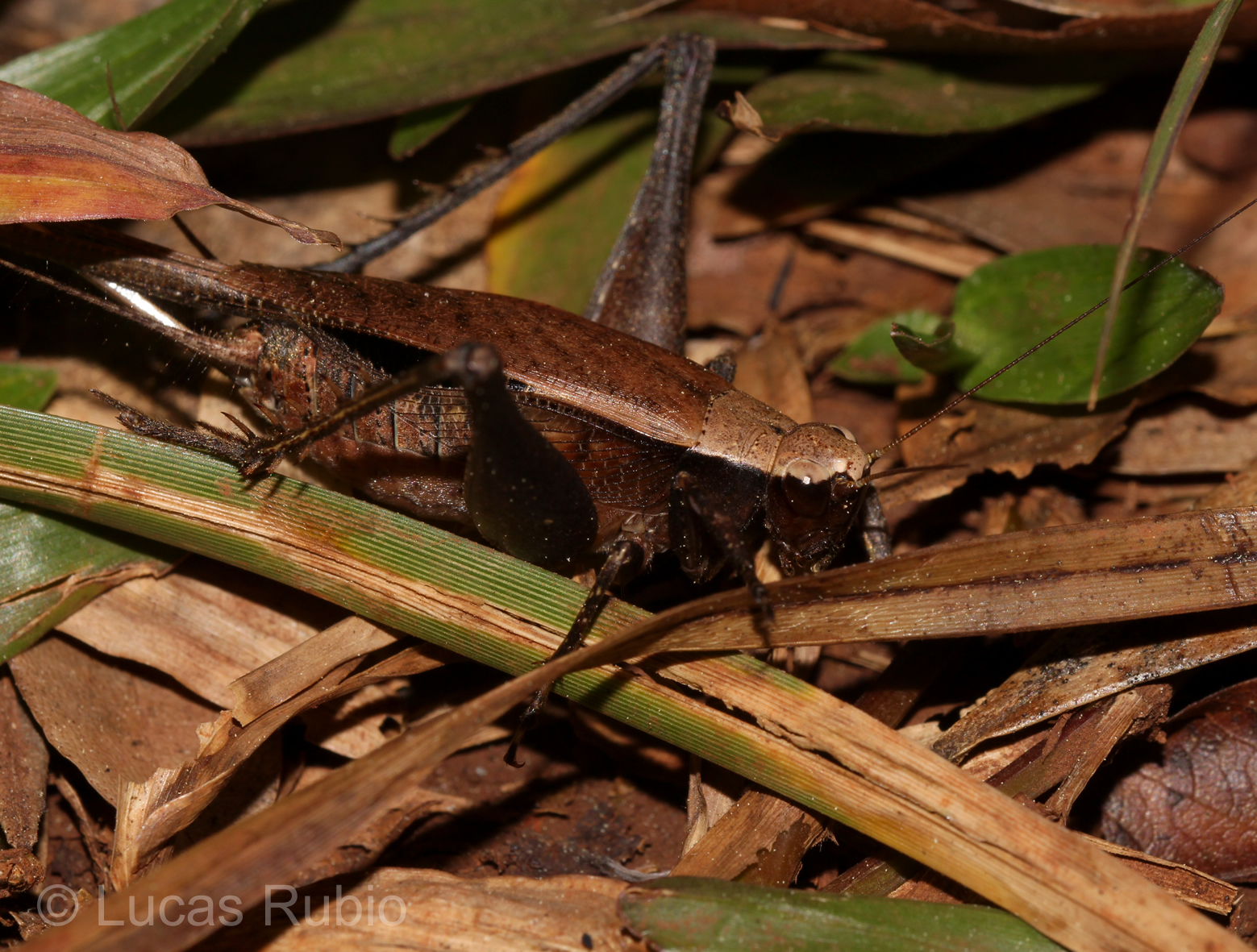
- Eneoptera surinamensis

Scientific classification
- Kingdom: Animalia
- Phylum: Arthropoda
- Class: Insecta
- Order: Orthoptera
- Suborder: Ensifera
- Family: Gryllidae
- Tribe: Eneopterini; Saussure, 1874
- Genus: Eneoptera; Burmeister, 1838

Species
- Eneoptera fasciata (Scudder, 1869); Eneoptera gracilis Robillard, 2005; Eneoptera guyanensis Chopard, 1931; Eneoptera nigripedis Robillard, 2005; Eneoptera surinamensis (DeGeer, 1773)

= Eneoptera =

Genus of insect

Call of Eneoptera surinamensis.

Eneoptera is a genus of cricket from the family Gryllidae. It is the sole member of the monotypic tribe Enopterini. It contains five species.
