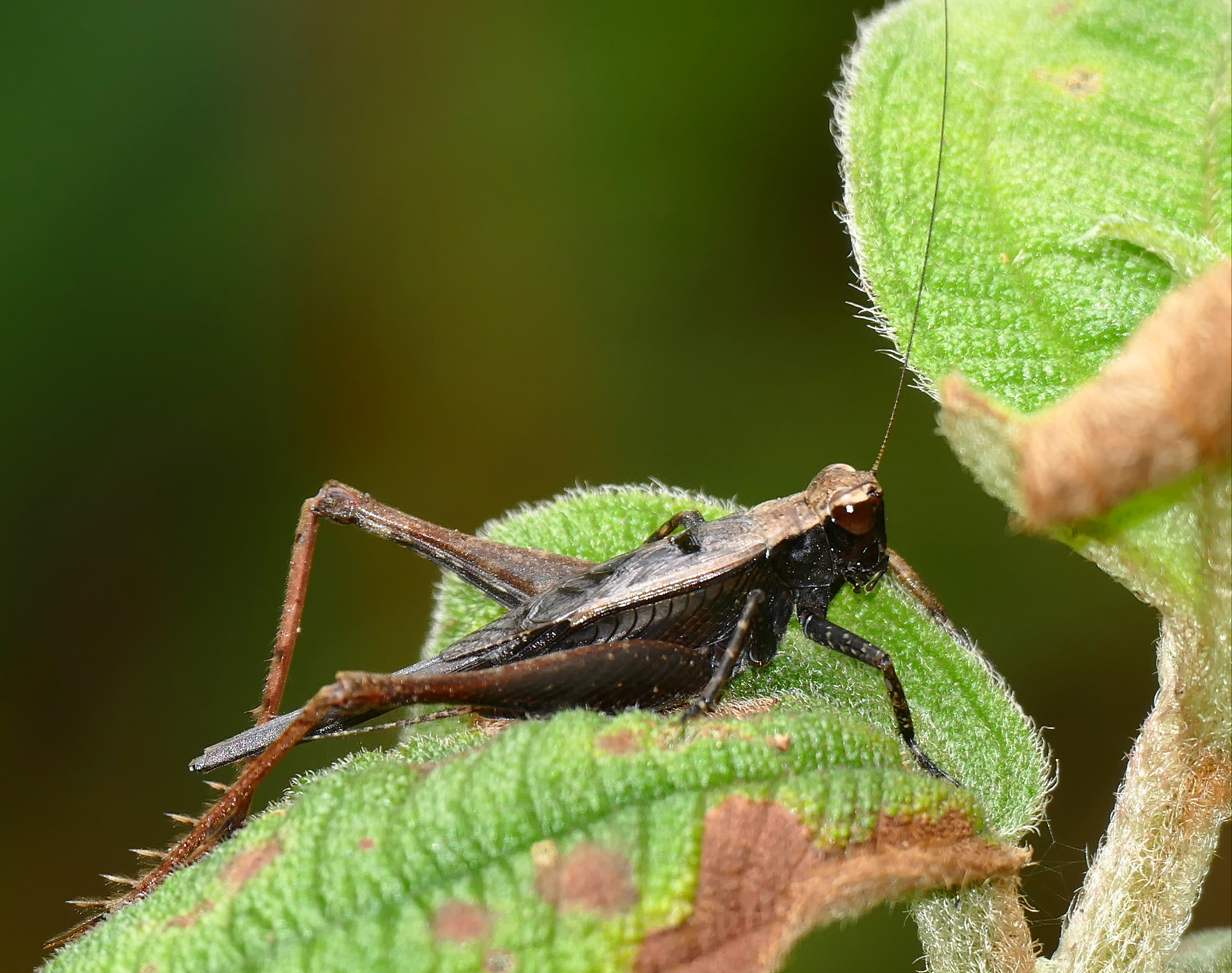
- Eneoptera guyanensis

Scientific classification
- Kingdom: Animalia
- Phylum: Arthropoda
- Class: Insecta
- Order: Orthoptera
- Suborder: Ensifera
- Family: Gryllidae
- Subfamily: Eneopterinae; Saussure, 1874

Genera
- See text

Synonyms
- Eneopteridae, Eneopteriens, Eneopterites Saussure, 1874; Platydactylidae Brunner von Wattenwyl, 1873

= Eneopterinae =

Subfamily of crickets

The Eneopterinae are a subfamily of crickets, in the family Gryllidae, based on the type genus Eneoptera. It is one of several groups widely described as "true crickets", but this subfamily may also referred to in American English as "bush crickets". Of the more than 500 species that make up this subfamily, most occur in moist, tropical habitats. These insects are medium to large and brown or gray in color. They eat plant leaves, flowers, and fruits and can occasionally cause economic damage. Their eggs are deposited in pith, bark, or wood. Eneopterinae show a great diversity in stridulatory apparatus, signals emitted, and associated behaviour.

== Tribes and genera ==
Eneopterinae currently consists of five tribes; a sixth tribe, Hemigryllini Gorochov, 1986 (for the South American genus Hemigryllus Saussure, 1877), is now treated as a separate subfamily, Hemigryllinae. Orthoptera Species File lists the following tribes and genera within Eneopterinae:

=== Eneopterini ===
Auth. Saussure, 1874 (South America)

- Eneoptera Burmeister, 1838

=== Eurepini ===
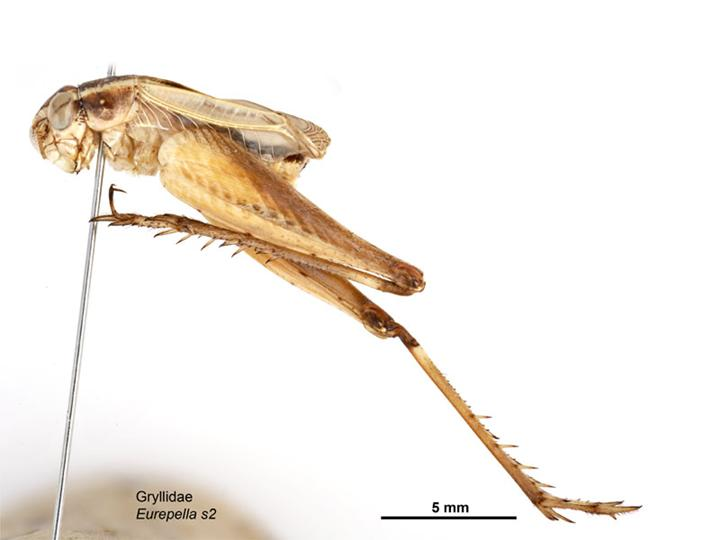
Eurepella mjobergi

Auth. Robillard, 2004 (mostly Australia, spp. of Eurepa from Thailand)

  - Arilpa Otte & Alexander, 1983
  - Arrakis Robillard, Tan & Su, 2024
  - Eurepa Walker, 1869
  - Eurepella Otte & Alexander, 1983
  - Miripella Robillard, Tan & Su, 2024
  - Napieria Baehr, 1989
  - Piestodactylus Saussure, 1878
  - Salmanites Chopard, 1951

=== Lebinthini ===
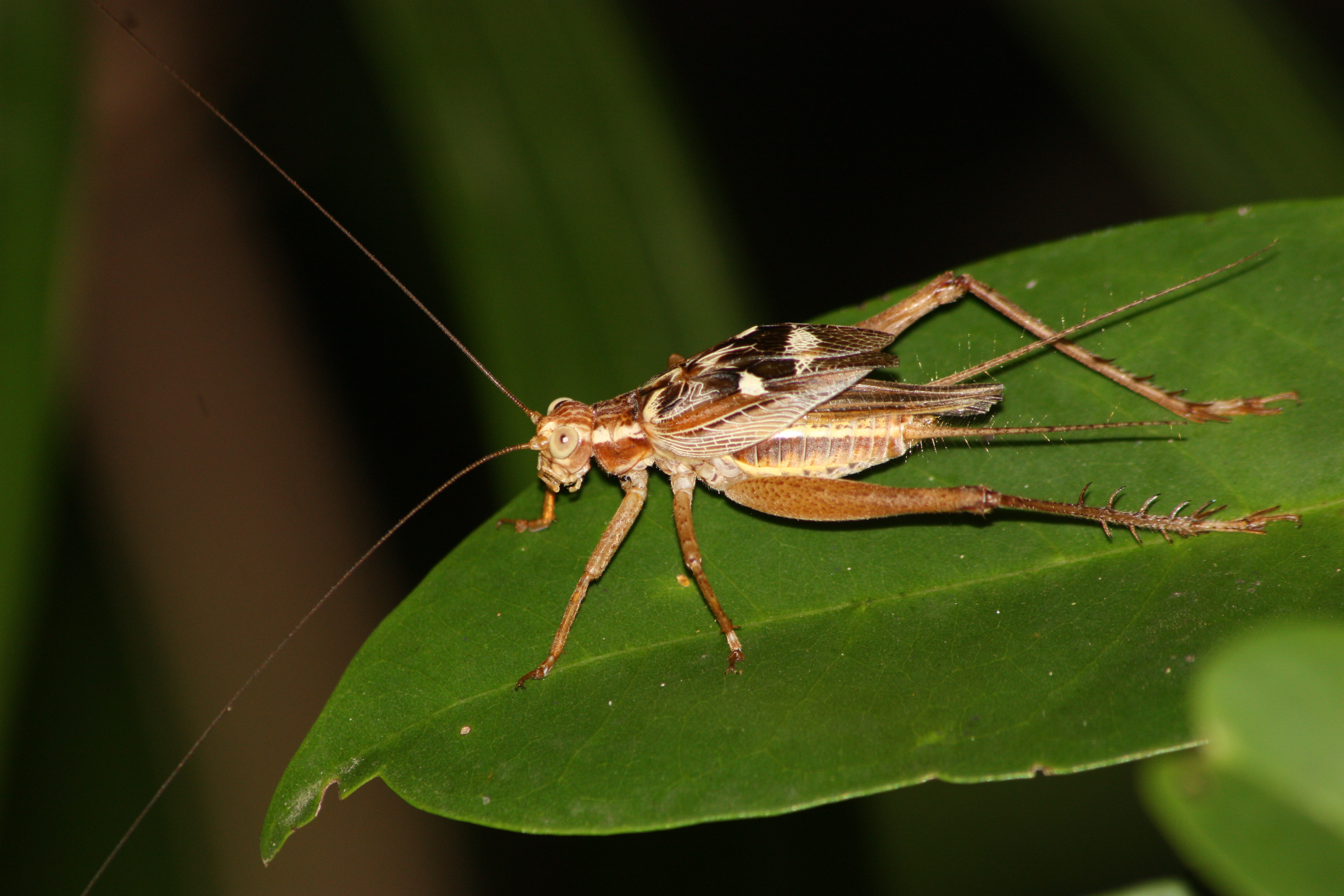
Cardiodactylus novaeguineae

Auth. Robillard, 2004 (SE Asia, Australia, Pacific, S. America)

- subtribe Cardiodactylina Robillard & Tan, 2021
  - Cardiodactylus Saussure, 1878
  - Swezwilderia Chopard, 1929
- subtribe Lebinthina Robillard, 2004
  - Agnothecous Saussure, 1878 (=Agnotecous)
  - Centuriarus Robillard, 2011
  - Diablotinthus Robillard & Tan, 2025
  - Fadinthus Robillard & Tan, 2021
  - Falcerminthus Robillard & Tan, 2021
  - Gnominthus Robillard & Vicente, 2015
  - Julverninthus Robillard & Su, 2018
  - Kanakinthus Le Flanchec & Robillard, 2025
  - Lebinthus Stål, 1877
  - Lutinthus Robillard & Tan, 2025
  - Macrobinthus Robillard & Dong, 2016
  - Microbinthus Robillard & Dong, 2016
  - Pixibinthus Robillard & Anso, 2016
  - Platybinthus Robillard & Tan, 2023
  - Rugabinthus Tan & Robillard, 2022
- subtribe Ligypterina Robillard & Tan, 2021
  - Ligypterus Saussure, 1878
  - Ponca Hebard, 1928

=== Nisitrini ===
Auth. Robillard, 2004 (Malesia, New Guinea)

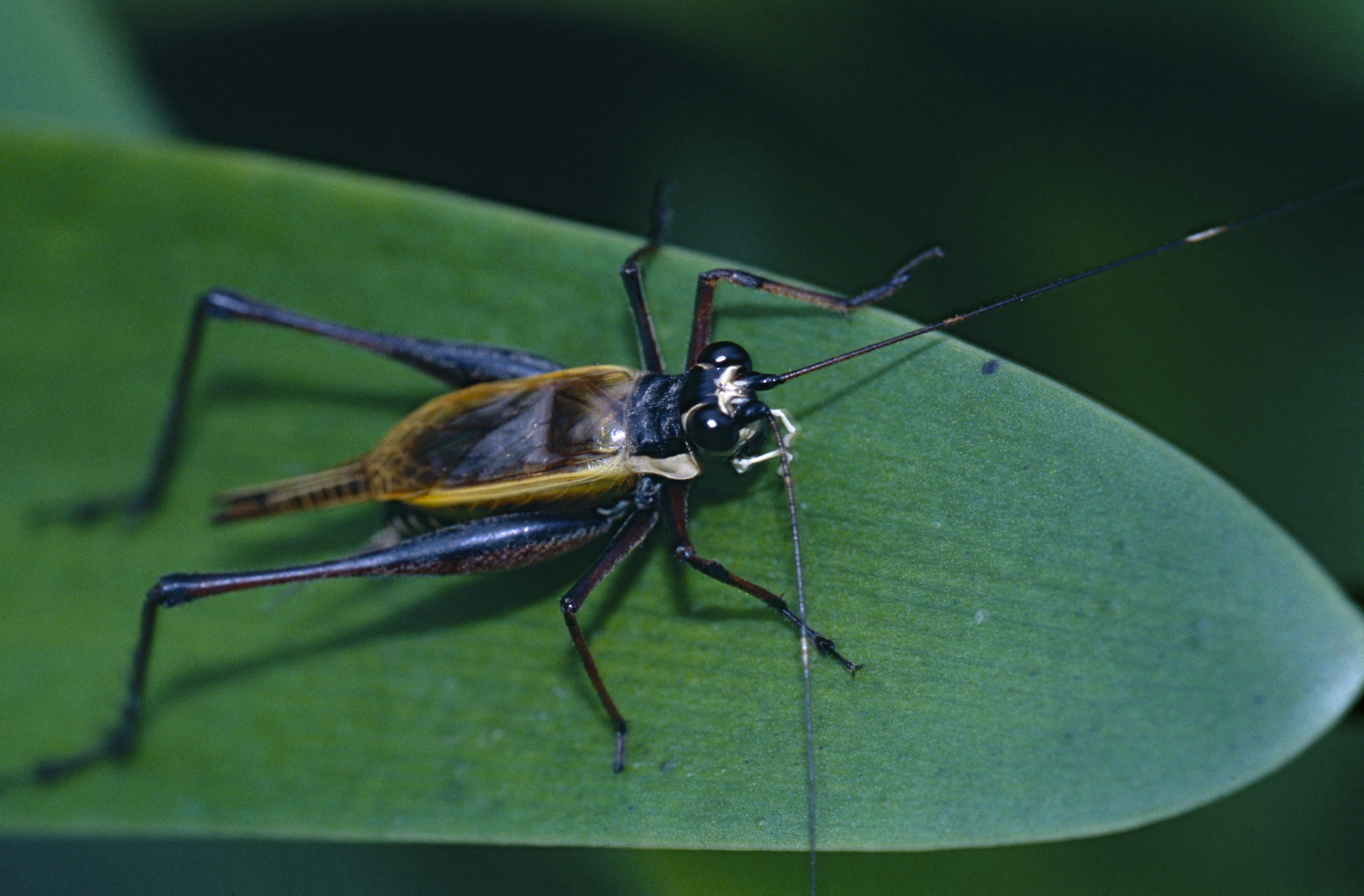
Nisitrus sp., Borneo

- Nisitrus Saussure, 1878
- Paranisitra Chopard, 1925

=== Xenogryllini ===
Auth. Robillard, 2004 (Central-southern Africa, Asia)

- Indigryllus Robillard & Jaiswara, 2019
- Pseudolebinthus Robillard, 2006
- Xenogryllus Bolívar, 1890

=== incertae sedis ===
- Antillobinthus Yong & Desutter-Grandcolas, 2020
- †Brontogryllus – monotypic – B. excelsus Martins-Neto, 1991
- †Proecanthus – monotypic – P. anatolicus Sharov, 1968
