= List of discontinued Volkswagen Group diesel engines =

List of discontinued Volkswagen Group diesel engines. The compression-ignition diesel engines listed below were formerly used by various marques of automobiles and commercial vehicles of the German automotive concern, Volkswagen Group, and also in Volkswagen Marine and Volkswagen Industrial Motor applications, but are now discontinued. All listed engines operate on the four-stroke cycle, and unless stated otherwise, use a wet sump lubrication system, and are water-cooled.

Since the Volkswagen Group is European, official internal combustion engine performance ratings are published using the International System of Units (commonly abbreviated "SI"), a modern form of the metric system of figures. Motor vehicle engines will have been tested by a Deutsches Institut für Normung (DIN) accredited testing facility, to either the original 80/1269/EEC, or the later 1999/99/EC standards. The standard initial measuring unit for establishing the rated power output is the kilowatt (kW); and in their official literature, the power rating may be published in either kilowatts, metric horsepower ('Pferdestärke' in German, often abbreviated PS), or both. Power outputs may also include conversions to imperial units such as the horsepower (hp) for the United States and Canadian markets. (Conversions: one PS ≈ 735.5 watts (W), ≈ 0.98632 hp (SAE)). In case of conflict, the metric power figure of kilowatts (kW) will be stated as the primary figure of reference. For the turning force generated by the engine, the Newton metre (Nm) will be the reference figure of torque. Furthermore, in accordance with European automotive traditions, engines shall be listed in the following ascending order of preference:

1. Number of cylinders,
2. Engine displacement (in litres),
3. Engine configuration, and
4. Rated power output (in kilowatts).

The diesel engines which Volkswagen Group currently manufactured and installed in today's vehicles, and Marine and Industrial applications, can be found in the list of Volkswagen Group diesel engines article.

== Two-cylinder diesels ==
=== 0.8 R2 TDI ===
This inline two-cylinder Turbocharged direct injection (TDI) diesel engine is the powerplant of the Volkswagen XL1

== Three-cylinder diesels ==
=== 1.2 R3 PD TDI 3L (EA188) ===
This inline three-cylinder Turbocharged direct injection (TDI) diesel engine is the powerplant of the Volkswagen Lupo 3L and Audi A2 3L, with a low fuel consumption of only 2.99 L/100 km (94.5 mpg_{‑imp}; 78.7 mpg_{‑US}) – hence the "3L" tag. It is based on the 1.4 TDI version, but the cylinder block is made of aluminium alloy, and some of the other components are lighter.

identification
class: EA188, parts code prefix: ???, ID codes: ANY, AYZ
engine configuration & engine displacement
inline three-cylinder (R3/I3) Turbocharged Direct Injection (TDI) turbodiesel; 1,191 cc (72.7 cu in), bore x stroke: 76.5 mm × 86.4 mm (3.01 in × 3.40 in), stroke ratio: 0.89:1 – undersquare/long-stroke, 397.1 cc per cylinder, compression ratio: 19.5:1
cylinder block & crankcase
cast aluminium alloy (saving 16 kg (35 lb)); simplex-chain-driven balance shaft and oil pump, four main bearings
piston and piston rods
Alcan aluminium pistons, trapezoid bearings shared with rods
cylinder head & valvetrain
cast aluminium alloy; two valves per cylinder, 6 valves in total, each with two concentric valve springs, belt-driven single overhead camshaft (SOHC)
aspiration
Garrett GT1541V turbocharger [Family 15, 41 mm (1.6 in) compressor wheel (exducer diameter), VNT (Variable-Nozzle Turbine)], side-mounted intercooler (upright),
water cooled exhaust gas recirculation (EGR) system integrated in heating cooling circuit (not in 1.4 TDI)
cooling system
increased engine coolant temperature of 90 °C (194 °F) (in 1.4 TDI: 85 °C (185 °F)), oil cooler integrated in engine cooling circuit (heating cooling circuit in 1.4 TDI)
fuel system
camshaft-actuated Pumpe Düse (PD) direct injection Unit Injectors, injection pressure up to 2,050 bar (29,733 psi) (approx. 180 bar (2,611 psi) pre-injection, min. 300 bar (4,351 psi) main-injection), increased recirculated fuel temperature from underfloor cooler of 60 °C (140 °F) (in 1.4 TDI: 30 °C (86 °F))
engine management
Bosch EDC 15P (variant spelling: EDC 15+) electronic engine control unit (ECU) (some few old ones EDC 15 only)
exhaust system
lightweight construction: reduced wall thickness and steel sheet exhaust manifold (instead of cast-iron),
one near-engine-mounted catalytic pre-converter, one main catalytic converter and an end muffler
(instead of one underfloor catalytic converter, one underfloor muffler and an end muffler attached to 1.4 TDI)
starter
strengthened Bosch starter motor (12V, 150A, 1800W with 9 tooth pinion) for stop-start system with quick-start-function and voltage stabiliser for airbag-system, radio and instrument cluster
dimensions
100 kg (220 lb)
DIN-rated power & torque output
SPORT mode:
45 kW (61 PS; 60 bhp) at 4,000 rpm; 140 N⋅m (103 lbf⋅ft) at 1,800–2,400 rpm, 80% available from 1,300 rpm
ECO mode:
33 kW (45 PS; 44 bhp) at 3,000 rpm; 120 N⋅m (89 lbf⋅ft) at 1,600–2,400 rpm, "redline" is 3,000 rpm (instead of 4,800 rpm)
idling speed
reduced while the car freewheels (above 13 km/h (8 mph)) to 770 rpm (otherwise 850 rpm)
mean effective pressure
14.8 bar (215 psi) (in SPORT mode)
mean efficiency in driving cycle
slightly over 30%
applications
Audi A2 3L (ANY:- A2: 03/01-08/05), Volkswagen Lupo 3L (ANY: 06/99-11/00, AYZ: 11/00-07/05)
references
"Audi A2 1.2 TDI: the three-litre car from Audi". AudiWorld.com. Audi AG – press release. 1999-11-28.

==== awards ====
was winner of two categories in the 1999 annual competition for International Engine of the Year – "Best Fuel Economy" and "1-litre to 1.4-litre"

=== 1.4 R3 6v TDI PD (EA188) 51-55-59-66-77kW ===
Origins

All R3 1,422 cc three cylinder engines are derived from the R4 1,896 cc 4 cylinder engine, VW just cut off one 474.1 cc cylinder.

identification
parts code prefix: 045
engine configuration & engine displacement
inline three-cylinder (R3/I3) Turbocharged Direct Injection (TDI) turbodiesel; 1,422 cc (86.8 cu in), bore x stroke: 79.5 mm × 95.5 mm (3.13 in × 3.76 in), stroke ratio: 0.83:1 – undersquare/long-stroke, 474.1 cc per cylinder, compression ratio: 18.0:1 to 19.5:1
cylinder block & crankcase
grey cast iron with bed-plate frame; inner and outer two-part oil sump; die-forged steel cross-plane crankshaft with 120 degree crankpins with four main bearings, simplex roller chain driven balance shaft; Mahle pistons; water:oil cooler
cylinder head & valvetrain
cast aluminium alloy, non-crossflow; two valves per cylinder, 6 valves total, each with two concentric valve springs, bucket tappets with manually adjustable rocker arms for valve clearance; timing belt-driven single overhead camshaft (SOHC)
aspiration
Bosch hot-film air mass meter, cast alloy Siemens-VDO throttle body with electronically controlled 'drive by wire' throttle butterfly valve, cast aluminium alloy intake manifold; Garrett variable turbine geometry (not all models) turbocharger incorporated in exhaust manifold, 2.3 bar (33.4 psi) absolute boost; side-mounted intercooler (SMIC)
fuel system & engine management
low-pressure fuel lift pump, underfloor fuel cooler; Pumpe Düse (PD) and Common rail (CR) high-pressure direct injection (with three camshaft pressurised solenoid operated combustion chamber sited Unit Injectors), Bosch EDC15P+ or EDC17 electronic engine control unit
exhaust system
cooled exhaust gas recirculation, oxidising catalytic converter, EU4 compliance
dimensions
127 kg (280 lb)
DIN-rated power & torque outputs, ID codes
51 kW (69 PS; 68 bhp) at 4,000 rpm; 155 N⋅m (114 lbf⋅ft) at 1,600-2,800 rpm — (BNM:- Polo: 04/05-, Ibiza & Cordoba: 05/05-, Fabia: 10/05-, Roomster: 07/06-), (BWB:- Polo: 05/06-)
55 kW (75 PS; 74 bhp) at 4,000 rpm; 195 N⋅m (144 lbf⋅ft) at 2,200 rpm — (AMF:- Polo: 10/99-09/01, Arosa: 10/99-05/03, Lupo: 05/99-07/05, A2: 06/00-08/03, Ibiza & Cordoba: 05/05-12/05, Fabia: 04/03-10/05), (BAY:- Polo: 11/03-06/05, 11/14-) (BHC:- A2: 09/03-08/05)
59 kW (80 PS; 79 bhp) at 4,000 rpm; 195 N⋅m (144 lbf⋅ft) at 2,200 rpm — (BMS:- Polo BlueMotion: 05/06-, Ibiza & Cordoba: 06/06-, Roomster DPF: 07/06-, Fabia DPF/GreenLine: 01/07-) (BNV:- Polo: 04/05-05/08, Ibiza & Cordoba: 05/05-, Fabia: 10/05-, Roomster: 05/06-)
66 kW (90 PS; 89 bhp) at 4,000 rpm; 230 N⋅m (170 lbf⋅ft) at 1,900-2,300 rpm — (ATL:- VW Polo: 01/00-04/00, 11/14- ) (A2: 11/03-08/05)
77 kW (105 PS; 103 bhp) at 4,000 rpm; 250 N⋅m (184 lbf⋅ft) at 1,900-2,300 rpm — (ATL:- VW Polo: 01/14-04/17)
applications – current
Audi A1, Škoda Fabia, Škoda Roomster, Volkswagen Polo various models,
applications – discontinued
Audi A2, SEAT Arosa(51 kW), SEAT Ibiza, SEAT Córdoba, Volkswagen Lupo, Volkswagen Fox

references
"New Audi A2 1.4 TDI with 90 bhp engine". WorldCarFans.com. Audi AG. 10 November 2003. Archived from the original on 18 April 2012. "New VW Fox in depth". WorldCarFans.com. Volkswagen AG. 4 April 2005.

awards
winner of the "1.0-litre to 1.4-litre" category in the 2001 annual competition for International Engine of the Year

=== 1.2 R3 12v TDI CR 55kW (EA189) ===
Origins
Motor type: EA 189 / All R3 1199 cc three cylinder engines are derived from the R4 1598 ccm 4 cylinder engine, VW just cut off one 399,5 ccm cylinder.

identification
parts code prefix: 03P, ID code: CFWA
engine configuration & engine displacement
inline three-cylinder (R3/I3) Turbocharged Direct Injection (TDI) turbodiesel; 1,199 cc (73.2 cu in), stroke: 79.5 mm × 80.5 mm (3.13 in × 3.17 in), stroke ratio: 0.99:1 – 'square engine', 399.6 cc per cylinder, compression ratio: 16.5:1
cylinder block & crankcase
Cast iron
cylinder head & valvetrain
cast aluminium alloy; four valves per cylinder, 12 valves total, double overhead camshaft (DOHC)

aspiration: turbocharger, intercooler, water-cooled exhaust gas recirculation

fuel system & engine management
Delphi Multec Diesel Common rail System
DIN-rated power & torque output
55 kW (75 PS; 74 bhp) at 4,200 rpm; 180 N⋅m (133 lbf⋅ft) at 2,000 rpm
applications
2009- Volkswagen Polo Mk5 (BlueMotion model with longer last two gears), 2010- SEAT Ibiza Mk5 Ecomotive, 2010- Škoda Fabia Mk2, 2010- Škoda Roomster,

== Four-cylinder diesels ==
=== EA111 ===
The EA111 series of internal combustion engines was introduced in the mid 1970s in the Audi 50, and shortly after in the original Volkswagen Polo. It is a series of water-cooled inline three- and inline four-cylinder petrol and diesel engines, in a variety of displacement sizes. This overhead camshaft engine features a crossflow cylinder head design, and directly driven auxiliary units. The exhaust side is in driving direction, closest to the front of the vehicle.

=== 1.3 R4 D 33kW ===
identification
parts code prefix: 031, ID codes: MN
engine configuration & engine displacement
inline four-cylinder (R4/I4) diesel engine; 1,272 cc (77.6 cu in); bore/stroke 75 / 72 mm, 318.0 cc per cylinder, compression ratio: 22.0:1
cylinder block & crankcase
gray cast iron; five main bearings
cylinder head & valvetrain
cast aluminium alloy; two valves per cylinder, mechanical valve-play compensation, single overhead camshaft (SOHC)
fuel system
Bosch VerteilerPumpe VP25 mechanical distributor injection pump, indirect fuel injection into whirl pre-combustion chamber
DIN-rated power & torque outputs
33 kW (45 PS; 44 bhp) at 4,900 rpm; 75 N⋅m (55 lbf⋅ft) at 2,800 rpm
application
Volkswagen Polo 1985-08 to 1990–07

=== 1.4 R4 D 35kW ===
identification
parts code prefix: 031, ID codes: 1W
engine configuration & engine displacement
inline four-cylinder (R4/I4) diesel engine; 1,398 cc (85.3 cu in); bore/stroke 75 / 79.1 mm, 347.75 cc per cylinder, compression ratio: 22.3:1
cylinder block & crankcase
gray cast iron; five main bearings
cylinder head & valvetrain
cast aluminium alloy; two valves per cylinder, mechanical valve-play compensation, single overhead camshaft (SOHC)
fuel system
Bosch VerteilerPumpe VP25 mechanical distributor injection pump, indirect fuel injection into whirl pre-combustion chamber
DIN-rated power & torque outputs
35 kW (48 PS; 47 bhp) at 4,500 rpm; 82 N⋅m (60 lbf⋅ft) at 2,700–3,500 rpm
application
Volkswagen Polo Mk2 1990-10 to 1994–07

NB. Not all technical details given in document showing the main characteristics of the 1.4-litre engine; they are assumed to be similar as it otherwise appears to be a longer-stroke version of the 1.3.

=== EA827 ===
The following are all part of the EA827 engine series, sharing a 88-millimetre (3.46 in) cylinder spacing:

=== 1.5 R4 D 33-37kW ===
identification
parts code prefix: 068
engine configuration & engine displacement
inline-four engine (R4/I4); 1,471 cc (89.8 cu in); bore x stroke: 76.5 mm × 80.0 mm (3.01 in × 3.15 in), stroke ratio: 0.96:1 – undersquare/long-stroke, 367.7 cc per cylinder, compression ratio: 23.5:1
cylinder block & crankcase
gray cast iron; five main bearings
cylinder head & valvetrain
two valves per cylinder, each with two concentric valve springs, 8 valves total, shim-adjustable bucket tappets, timing belt-driven single overhead camshaft (SOHC)
aspiration
cast aluminium alloy intake manifold, cast iron exhaust manifold
fuel system
timing belt-driven Bosch mechanical distributor injection pump, indirect fuel injection into whirl chamber
EWG-rated power & torque output, application, ID code
33 kW (45 PS; 44 bhp) — Volkswagen Industrial Motor (682: 12/77-01/82)
DIN-rated power & torque output, ID code
37 kW (50 PS; 50 bhp) at 4,400 rpm; 90 N⋅m (66 lbf⋅ft) at 2,800 rpm — CK
applications
Volkswagen Golf Mk1 (08/76-7/80), Volkswagen Passat B1 (08/77-7/80)

=== 1.6 R4 D 36-40kW ===
identification
parts code prefix: 068
engine configuration & engine displacement
inline-four engine (R4/I4); 1,588 cc (96.9 cu in); bore x stroke: 76.5 mm × 86.4 mm (3.01 in × 3.40 in), stroke ratio: 0.89:1 – undersquare/long-stroke, 397.1 cc per cylinder, compression ratio: 23.5:1
cylinder block & crankcase
gray cast iron; five main bearings
cylinder head & valvetrain
two valves per cylinder, each with two concentric valve springs, 8 valves total, shim-adjustable bucket tappets, timing belt-driven single overhead camshaft (SOHC)
aspiration
cast aluminium alloy intake manifold, cast iron exhaust manifold
fuel system
timing belt-driven Bosch mechanical distributor injection pump, indirect fuel injection into whirl chamber
EWG-rated power & torque output, application, ID codes
36 kW (49 PS; 48 bhp) — Volkswagen Industrial Motor (685: 12/81-10/88, 68D: 03/89-03/94)
40 kW (54 PS; 54 bhp) — Volkswagen Industrial Motor (ADK: 04/94-07/96)
DIN-rated power & torque outputs, ID codes
37 kW (50 PS; 50 bhp) at 4,200 rpm; 100 N⋅m (74 lbf⋅ft) at 2,500 rpm — CS
40 kW (54 PS; 54 bhp) at 4,800 rpm; 100 N⋅m (74 lbf⋅ft) at 2,300 rpm — CR
40 kW (54 PS; 54 bhp) at 4,800 rpm; 102 N⋅m (75 lbf⋅ft) at 2,000 rpm — JK
40 kW (54 PS; 54 bhp) at 4,580 rpm; 100 N⋅m (74 lbf⋅ft) at 2,300 rpm — JP
applications
Audi 80 (CR: 8/80-7/82, JK: 8/82-7/89), Volkswagen Polo (JK), Volkswagen Golf (CR: 8/80-7/82, JP: 8/83-10/91), Volkswagen Jetta (CR: 8/80-7/82, JP: 12/83-10/91), Volkswagen Passat/Santana (CR: 8/80-7/82, JK: 8/82-3/88), Volkswagen Type 2 (CS: 01/81-07/87)

=== 1.6 R4 D 40kW ===
identification
parts code prefix: 068, ID code: ME
engine configuration & engine displacement
inline-four engine (R4/I4); 1,588 cc (96.9 cu in); bore x stroke: 76.5 mm × 86.4 mm (3.01 in × 3.40 in), stroke ratio: 0.89:1 – undersquare/long-stroke, 397.1 cc per cylinder, compression ratio: 23.0:1
cylinder block & crankcase
gray cast iron; five main bearings
cylinder head & valvetrain
two valves per cylinder, each with two concentric valve springs, 8 valves total, hydraulic valve-clearance compensation, timing belt-driven single overhead camshaft (SOHC)
aspiration
cast aluminium alloy intake manifold, cast iron exhaust manifold
fuel system
timing belt-driven Bosch mechanical distributor injection pump, indirect fuel injection into whirl chamber, altitude corrector
DIN-rated power & torque output
40 kW (54 PS; 54 bhp) at 4,800 rpm; 96 N⋅m (71 lbf⋅ft) at 2,500 rpm
applications
Volkswagen Golf (07/85-07/92), Volkswagen Jetta (07/85-07/91), Volkswagen Caddy (08/90-07/92)

=== 1.6 R4 TD 44-51kW ===
identification
parts code prefix: 068
engine configuration & engine displacement
inline four-cylinder (R4/I4) turbodiesel; 1,588 cc (96.9 cu in); bore x stroke: 76.5 mm × 86.4 mm (3.01 in × 3.40 in), stroke ratio: 0.89:1 – undersquare/long-stroke, 391.1 cc per cylinder, compression ratio: 23.0:1
cylinder block & crankcase
gray cast iron; five main bearings
cylinder head & valvetrain
two valves per cylinder, each with two concentric valve springs, 8 valves total, shim-adjustable bucket tappets, timing belt-driven single overhead camshaft (SOHC)
aspiration
Garrett or Kühnle, Kopp & Kausch (KKK) turbocharger, cast aluminium alloy intake manifold, cast iron exhaust manifold
fuel system
timing belt-driven Bosch mechanical distributor injection pump, indirect fuel injection into whirl chamber
EWG-rated power & torque outputs, application and ID codes
45 kW (61 PS; 60 bhp) — Volkswagen Industrial Motor (68A: 04/83-08/88), (686: 03/89-12/90)
50 kW (68 PS; 67 bhp) — Volkswagen Industrial Motor (68C: 04/83-03/94)
DIN-rated power & torque outputs, ID codes
51 kW (69 PS; 68 bhp) at 4,500 rpm; 133 N⋅m (98 lbf⋅ft) at 2,600 rpm — CY, JR
51 kW (69 PS; 68 bhp) at 4,500 rpm; 138 N⋅m (102 lbf⋅ft) at 2,500 rpm — JX
applications
Audi 80 (CY: 02/82-03/87), Volkswagen Golf (CY: 8/81-7/84, JR: 08/83-10/91), Volkswagen Jetta (CY: 8/81-7/84, JR: 12/83-10/91), Volkswagen Passat (CY: 8/81-4/88), Volkswagen Santana (CY: 9/81-12/84), Volkswagen Type 2 (JX: 8/84-7/91), Volkswagen Type 2 Syncro (JX: 8/85-7/92), Volkswagen Type 2 (T3) (JX)

=== 1.6 R4 TD 51kW ===
identification
parts code prefix: 068, ID code: MF
engine configuration & engine displacement
inline four-cylinder (R4/I4) turbodiesel; 1,588 cc (96.9 cu in); bore x stroke: 76.5 mm × 86.4 mm (3.01 in × 3.40 in), stroke ratio: 0.89:1 – undersquare/long-stroke, 391.1 cc per cylinder, compression ratio: 23.0:1
cylinder block & crankcase
gray cast iron; five main bearings
cylinder head & valvetrain
two valves per cylinder, 8 valves total, hydraulic valve-clearance compensation, timing belt-driven single overhead camshaft (SOHC)
aspiration
Garrett or Kühnle, Kopp & Kausch (KKK) turbocharger, cast aluminium alloy intake manifold, cast iron exhaust manifold
fuel system
timing belt-driven Bosch mechanical distributor injection pump, indirect fuel injection into whirl chamber
DIN-rated power & torque output
51 kW (69 PS; 68 bhp) at 4,500 rpm; 133 N⋅m (98 lbf⋅ft) at 2,500 rpm
application
Volkswagen Golf Mk2 5/88-10/91

=== 1.6 R4 TD 59kW ===
identification
parts code prefix: ???
engine configuration & engine displacement
inline four-cylinder (R4/I4) turbodiesel; 1,588 cc (96.9 cu in); bore x stroke: 76.5 mm × 86.4 mm (3.01 in × 3.40 in), stroke ratio: 0.89:1 – undersquare/long-stroke, 391.1 cc per cylinder, compression ratio: 23.0:1
cylinder block & crankcase
gray cast iron; five main bearings
cylinder head & valvetrain
RA: two valves per cylinder, 8 valves total, mechanical bucket tappets, timing belt-driven single overhead camshaft (SOHC)
SB: two valves per cylinder, 8 valves total, hydraulic valve-clearance compensation, timing belt-driven single overhead camshaft (SOHC)
aspiration
Garrett turbocharger, intercooler, cast aluminium alloy intake manifold, cast iron exhaust manifold
fuel system
timing belt-driven Bosch mechanical distributor injection pump, indirect fuel injection into whirl chamber
DIN-rated power & torque outputs, ID codes
59 kW (80 PS; 79 bhp) at 4,500 rpm; 152 N⋅m (112 lbf⋅ft) at 2,500 rpm — RA
59 kW (80 PS; 79 bhp) at 4,500 rpm; 155 N⋅m (114 lbf⋅ft) at 2,500 rpm — SB
applications
Audi 80/90 (RA: 04/88-07/90, SB: 04/89-12/91), Volkswagen Golf (RA: 04/89-02/90, SB: 08/89-10/91), Volkswagen Jetta Mk2 (RA: 04/89-02/90, SB: 08/89-10/91), Volkswagen Passat B2 (RA: 08/88-07/89), Volkswagen Passat B3 (SB: 08/89-10/93)

=== 1.7 R4 D 42kW ===
identification
parts code prefix: 033, ID code: KY
engine configuration & engine displacement
inline-four engine (R4/I4); 1,716 cc (104.7 cu in); bore x stroke: 79.5 mm × 86.4 mm (3.13 in × 3.40 in), stroke ratio: 0.92:1 – undersquare/long-stroke, 428.9 cc per cylinder, compression ratio: 23.0:1
cylinder block & crankcase
gray cast iron; five main bearings
cylinder head & valvetrain
two valves per cylinder, 8 valves total, hydraulic valve-clearance compensation, timing belt-driven single overhead camshaft (SOHC)
aspiration
cast aluminium alloy intake manifold, cast iron exhaust manifold
fuel system
timing belt-driven Bosch mechanical distributor injection pump, indirect fuel injection into whirl chamber
DIN-rated power & torque output
42 kW (57 PS; 56 bhp) at 4,500 rpm; 103 N⋅m (76 lbf⋅ft) at 2,800 rpm
application
Volkswagen Type 2 10/86-5/92

=== 1.7 R4 SDI 44kW ===
identification
parts code prefix: 028, ID codes: AHB, AHG, AKU, AKW
engine configuration & engine displacement
inline four-cylinder (R4/I4) Suction Direct Injection (SDI); 1,716 cc (104.7 cu in); bore x stroke: 79.5 mm × 86.4 mm (3.13 in × 3.40 in), stroke ratio: 0.92:1 – undersquare/long-stroke, 428.9 cc per cylinder, compression ratio: 19.5:1
cylinder block & crankcase
gray cast iron; five main bearings
cylinder head & valvetrain
cast aluminium alloy; two valves per cylinder, 8 valves total, timing belt-driven single overhead camshaft (SOHC)
aspiration
cast aluminium alloy intake manifold, cast iron exhaust manifold
fuel system & engine management
timing belt-driven Robert Bosch GmbH VP37 (VerteilerPumpe) distributor injection pump with direct injection (DI)
exhaust system
catalytic converter, European EU3 emissions compliant
DIN-rated power & torque output
44 kW (60 PS; 59 bhp) at 4,200 rpm; 115 N⋅m (85 lbf⋅ft) at 2,200 rpm
applications
Volkswagen Lupo, SEAT Arosa, Volkswagen Polo, Volkswagen Caddy Mk2

=== 1.9 R4 D 44-50kW ===
identification
parts code prefix: 028
engine configuration & engine displacement
inline-four engine (R4/I4); 1,896 cc (115.7 cu in), bore x stroke: 79.5 mm × 95.5 mm (3.13 in × 3.76 in), stroke ratio: 0.83:1 – undersquare/long-stroke, 474.1 cc per cylinder, compression ratio: 22.0:1 – 22.5:1
cylinder block & crankcase
gray cast iron; five main bearings, die-forged steel crankshaft
cylinder head & valvetrain
cast aluminium alloy; two valves per cylinder, 8 valves total, timing belt-driven single overhead camshaft (SOHC)
aspiration
cast aluminium alloy intake manifold, cast iron exhaust manifold
fuel system
timing belt-driven Lucas LS4000 mechanical distributor injection pump, indirect fuel injection into whirl chamber
EWG-rated power & torque output, ID codes, application
44 kW (60 PS; 59 bhp) — ARD: Volkswagen Industrial Motor (01/02->)
48 kW (65 PS; 64 bhp) — 28B, ADG: Volkswagen Industrial Motor (28B: 01/90-03/94, ADG: 04/94->)
DIN-rated power & torque output, ID codes
47 kW (64 PS; 63 bhp) at 4,300 rpm; 124 N⋅m (91 lbf⋅ft) at 2,500–3,200 rpm — 1Y, AEF
50 kW (68 PS; 67 bhp) at 4,400 rpm; 127 N⋅m (94 lbf⋅ft) at 2,200–2,600 rpm — 1Y
applications
Audi 80 (1Y: 08/89-12/91), SEAT Ibiza Mk2 (1Y: 02/93-06/99), SEAT Cordoba (1Y: 09/93-06/99), SEAT Toledo (1Y: 05/91-03/99), SEAT Inca (1Y: 11/95-06/03), Škoda Felicia (AEF: 10/95-08/01), Volkswagen Golf, Volkswagen Passat B3 (1Y: 05/89-09/93), Volkswagen Polo 6N (1994–2001), Volkswagen Vento A3 (1992–1998, not available in the US Jetta).

=== 1.9 R4 TD 55kW ===
identification
parts code prefix:028 ID code: AAZ, ADE, ABL
engine configuration & engine displacement
inline four-cylinder (R4/I4) turbodiesel; 1,896 cc (115.7 cu in); bore x stroke: 79.5 mm × 95.5 mm (3.13 in × 3.76 in), stroke ratio: 0.83:1 – undersquare/long-stroke, 474.1 cc per cylinder, compression ratio: 22.0:1
cylinder block & crankcase
gray cast iron; five main bearings
cylinder head & valvetrain
cast aluminium alloy; two valves per cylinder, 8 valves total, timing belt-driven single overhead camshaft (SOHC)
aspiration
Garrett turbocharger
fuel system
timing belt-driven Bosch mechanical distributor injection pump, indirect fuel injection into whirl chamber
EWG-rated power & torque output, ID code, application
55 kW (75 PS; 74 bhp) — ADE: Volkswagen Industrial Motor (04/94-01/02)
DIN-rated power & torque output, ID code
55 kW (75 PS; 74 bhp) at 4,200 rpm; 150 N⋅m (111 lbf⋅ft) at 2,000 rpm — AAZ
applications
Audi 80 (09/91-07/95), Volkswagen Golf Mk3 (92–97), Volkswagen Passat B4 (93-96), SEAT Ibiza Mk2 (02/93-08/97), SEAT Córdoba (09/93-08/97), SEAT Toledo (05/91-04/97), Volkswagen Vento A3 (92-98)

=== 1.9 R4 8v SD 36kW ===
This is the industrial variant of the naturally aspirated (non-turbo) indirect injection version of the 1.9 SDI VE37

identification
parts code prefix: 028, ID code: 436
engine configuration & engine displacement
inline-four engine (R4/I4); 1,896 cc (115.7 cu in); bore x stroke: 79.5 mm × 95.5 mm (3.13 in × 3.76 in), stroke ratio: 0.83:1 – undersquare/long-stroke, 474.1 cc per cylinder, compression ratio: 18,5:1
cylinder block & crankcase
grey cast iron; five main bearings, die-forged steel crankshaft
cylinder head & valvetrain
cast aluminium alloy; two valves per cylinder, 8 valves total, bucket tappets, single overhead camshaft (SOHC)
aspiration
cast aluminium alloy intake manifold, cast iron exhaust manifold
fuel system & engine management
Bosch VE 37 series distributor injection pump, indirect injection into swirl pre-chambers
EWG-rated power & torque output
36 kW (49 PS; 48 bhp) at 3,000 rpm; 121 N⋅m (89 lbf⋅ft) at 1,800 rpm
application
Volkswagen Industrial Motor
reference
"Volkswagen SD 1.9 – 436 Industrial Engine" (PDF), mi-uk.com, Volkswagen AG, April 2006, archived from the original (PDF) on 14 July 2011

=== 1.9 R4 SDI 29-50kW ===
This is a naturally aspirated (non-turbo) Suction Diesel Injection version of the 1.9 TDI VP37

identification
parts code prefix: 028 or 038; ID codes: AGD, AGP, ASX, ASY, AYQ, AQM
engine configuration & engine displacement
inline four-cylinder (R4/I4) Suction Diesel Injection (SDI); 1,896 cc (115.7 cu in); bore x stroke: 79.5 mm × 95.5 mm (3.13 in × 3.76 in), stroke ratio: 0.83:1 – undersquare/long-stroke, 474.1 cc per cylinder, compression ratio: 19.5:1 (44 kW – 19.5:1)
cylinder block & crankcase
grey cast iron; five main bearings, die-forged steel crankshaft
cylinder head & valvetrain
cast aluminium alloy; two valves per cylinder, 8 valves total, bucket tappets, single overhead camshaft (SOHC)
aspiration
cast aluminium alloy intake manifold, cast iron exhaust manifold
fuel system & engine management
Bosch VP37 (Verteiler Pumpe) electronic distributor injection pump, direct injection (DI) with five-hole nozzles, Bosch EDC 15V+ electronic engine control unit (ECU)
dimensions
mass: 198 kg (437 lb) (dry weight, Marine variants)
EWG-rated power & torque outputs, ID codes, application
30 kW (41 PS; 40 bhp) at 2,800 rpm;— BXT Volkswagen Industrial Motor 430 (05/06->)
44 kW (60 PS; 59 bhp) at 3,600 rpm; 130 N⋅m (96 lbf⋅ft) at 2,200 rpm — AEY Volkswagen Industrial Motor 444
DIN-rated power & torque outputs, ID codes, applications
29 kW (39 PS; 39 bhp) at 2,600 rpm; 125 N⋅m (92 lbf⋅ft) at 2,000 rpm — BGM Volkswagen Marine 40-4 (02/03->)
33 kW (45 PS; 44 bhp) — BEQ Volkswagen Marine (02/02->)
37 kW (50 PS; 50 bhp) at 3,000 rpm; 125 N⋅m (92 lbf⋅ft) at 2,000 rpm — BGL Volkswagen Marine 50-4 (02/03->)
44 kW (60 PS; 59 bhp) at 3,600 rpm; 125 N⋅m (92 lbf⋅ft) at 2,000 rpm — ANC Volkswagen Marine 60-4 (02/03->)
47 kW (64 PS; 63 bhp) at 4,200 rpm; 125 N⋅m (92 lbf⋅ft) at 1,600-2,800 rpm — ASY
50 kW (68 PS; 67 bhp) at 4,000 rpm; 133 N⋅m (98 lbf⋅ft) at 1,800 rpm — AQM
applications
VW Polo 6N/6KV (AEY: 12/95-08/99), VW Polo 9N/9N3 (ASY: 10/01-04/05), VW Golf Mk3, VW Golf Mk4 & Volkswagen Golf Mk5 (AEY: 07/95-02/99), VW Vento (AEY: 07/95-12/97), VW Caddy Mk2 (AEY: 11/95-09/00), Škoda Fabia, SEAT Ibiza Mk2/SEAT Cordoba 6K (AEY: 09/95-06/99), SEAT León Mk1 (1M) (AQM: 06/00-10/03), SEAT Inca (AEY: 11/95-09/00), Volkswagen Jetta King (ASY: 04/02-03/10), Volkswagen Jetta Pioneer (ASY: 03/10-03/13)
reference
"The SDI 1.9 Industrial Engine" (PDF), mi-uk.com, Volkswagen AG, March 2005, archived from the original (PDF) on 14 July 2011 "SDI 40-4 – technical data". vw-m.de. Volkswagen AG. Archived from the original on 19 July 2011. "SDI 50-4 – technical data". vw-m.de. Volkswagen AG. Archived from the original on 19 July 2011. "SDI 60-4 – technical data". vw-m.de. Volkswagen AG. Archived from the original on 19 July 2011.

=== 1.9 R4 8v TDI 29-81kW (EA827/EA180) ===
Some engines in this list are from the older EA827 family (1Z, AHU) and some engines are from the newer EA180 family (ALH/ASV) The two families do not share many parts, however they were often installed in the same generation vehicle and thus are listed together.

identification
parts code prefix: 038, 064 (Volkswagen Marine)
engine configuration & engine displacement
inline four-cylinder (R4/I4) Turbocharged Direct Injection (TDI) turbodiesel; 1,896 cc (115.7 cu in); bore x stroke: 79.5 mm × 95.5 mm (3.13 in × 3.76 in), stroke ratio: 0.83:1 – undersquare/long-stroke, 474.1 cc per cylinder, compression ratio: 19.5:1
cylinder block & crankcase
grey cast iron; five main bearings, die-forged steel crankshaft, fracture-split forged steel connecting rods, Mahle or Alcan pistons, simplex belt-driven oil pump, cast aluminium alloy baffled oil sump
cylinder head & valvetrain
cast aluminium alloy; two valves per cylinder, 8 valves total, bucket tappets, timing belt-driven single overhead camshaft (SOHC)
aspiration
hot-wire mass air flow (MAF) sensor, cast aluminium alloy intake manifold, Garrett or KKK turbocharger, side-mounted intercooler (SMIC), exhaust gas recirculation (EGR), cast iron exhaust manifold
fuel system & engine management
timing belt-driven Bosch VP37 (VerteilerPumpe) electronic distributor injection pump, direct injection (DI) with five-hole nozzles, Bosch MSA 12, MSA 15.5, EDC 15V+, EDC 15VM+V electronic engine control unit (Marine variant uses MDC)
dimensions
mass: 200 kg (441 lb) (Marine variants, dry weight)
EWG-rated power & torque output, ID code, application
60 kW (82 PS; 80 bhp) — AFD: Volkswagen Industrial Motor – 480 (04/94-01/02)
DIN-rated power & torque outputs, ID codes
29 kW (40 PS; 39 bhp) — CDX Volkswagen Marine (10/07->)
55 kW (75 PS; 74 bhp) at 3,600 rpm; 155 N⋅m (114 lbf⋅ft) at 2,000 rpm — CDX Volkswagen Marine (10/07->)
66 kW (90 PS; 89 bhp) at 4,000 rpm; 202 N⋅m (149 lbf⋅ft) at 1,900 rpm — 1Z, AHU
66 kW (90 PS; 89 bhp) at 3,750 rpm; 210 N⋅m (155 lbf⋅ft) at 1,900 rpm — AGR, AHH, ALE, ALH
81 kW (110 PS; 109 bhp) at 4,150 rpm; 235 N⋅m (173 lbf⋅ft) at 1,900 rpm — AFN, AHF, ASV, AVG
applications

Audi

- A3 (8L): AHU (09/96-08/00), AHF (01/97-04/02), ALH (08/97-06/01), ASV (09/99-06/01)
- 80 (B4): 1Z (09/91-07/95)
- Cabriolet: 1Z (07/95-07/96), AHU (07/96-08/00)
- A4 (B5): 1Z (01/95-07/96), AFN (02/96-07/99), AHU (08/96-06/00), AHH (04/97-09/01), AVG (08/99-06/00)
- A6 (C4): 1Z (07/94-06/96), AHU (07/96-10/97)
- A6 (C5): AFN (04/97-04/01), AVG (08/99-10/00)

Ford

- Galaxy Mk1: 1Z (03/96-07/96), AHU (07/96-02/00), AFN/AVG (09/97-02/00)

SEAT

- Ibiza (6K): 1Z (07/96-12/96), AHU (12/96-06/99), AFN (03/97-06/99), ASV (03/99-05/02), AGR (04/99-05/02), ALH (10/99-05/02)
- Córdoba (6K): 1Z (07/96-12/96), AHU (12/96-06/99), AFN (03/97-06/99), ASV (03/99-08/02), AGR (04/99-08/02), ALH (10/99-05/01)
- León 1M (Mk1): ASV (10/99-10/05), AGR/AHF (11/99-09/02), ALH (05/00-10/05)
- Toledo (1L): 1Z (04/95-12/96), AHU (06/96-03/99), AFN (12/96-03/99)
- Toledo (1M): ALH (03/99-07/04), AGR (04/99-09/02), AHF (10/98-09/02), ASV (10/99-07/04)
- Alhambra (7M): 1Z (03/96-07/96), AHU (07/96-02/00), AFN/AVG (09/97-02/00)

Škoda

- Octavia (1U): AGR/ALH (10/96-??/05), AHF/ASV (08/97-??/05)

Volkswagen

- Polo (6N/6KV) (Classic/Variant): AHU (01/97-08/99), ALE (11/97-08/99), AFN (06/98-08/99), AGR/ALH/ASV (10/99-09/01)
- Golf (1H): 1Z (07/93-07/96, AFN (02/96-08/99), AHU (07/96-06/00)
- Vento/Jetta (1H): 1Z (07/93-07/96), AFN (02/96-12/97), ALE (01/97-12/97), AHU (08/96-??/??)
- Golf (1J): AHF (10/97-05/06), AGR/ALH (10/97-05/06), ASV (05/00-05/06), ALE^{(Golf 3.5 Cabrio only)} (??/98-??/02)
- Bora/Jetta (1J): AHF/ALH (09/98-05/055, AGR (10/98-05/05), ALH (11/98-05/05), ASV (05/00-05/05)
- New Beetle (1C/9C): (ALH 01/98-06/04)
- Passat (B3): 1Z (10/93-12/96)
- Passat (B4): AFN (03/96-06/96)
- Passat (B5): AFN (03/96-08/99), AHU (08/96-08/00), AHH (05/98-08/00), AVG (08/99-08/00)
- Sharan (7M): 1Z (09/95-07/96), AHU (08/96-10/00), AFN (12/96-07/99)
- Caddy (9K): 1Z (10/96-03/97), AHU (10/96-09/00), ALE (09/97-09/00), ALH (09/00-06/03)

reference
"TDI 75-4 – technical data". vw-m.de. Volkswagen AG. Archived from the original on 19 July 2011.

=== 1.9 R4 8v TDI PD 43-118kW ===
Essentially, this ubiquitous engine has the same bottom end (cylinder block/crankcase, crankshaft) as the earlier 1.9 R4 TDI which uses a VP37 Verteiler-Pumpe distributor injection pump. However, a new cylinder head is fitted to this "PD" engine, to accommodate "Pumpe Düse" Unit Injectors.

parts code prefix: 038, 03G

(VAG group indicate higher output models by a red 'I' on their TDI badge, e.g. 96 kW model Audi B6 A4. Because of this, the term 'red I' has entered into automotive technicians parlance)

engine configuration & engine displacement
inline four-cylinder (R4/I4) Turbocharged Direct Injection (TDI) turbodiesel; 1,896 cc (115.7 cu in); bore x stroke: 79.5 mm × 95.5 mm (3.13 in × 3.76 in), stroke ratio: 0.83:1 – undersquare/long-stroke, 474.1 cc per cylinder, compression ratio: 19.0:1
cylinder block & crankcase
grey cast iron; five main bearings, die-forged steel crankshaft, fracture-split forged steel connecting rods, Mahle or Alcan pistons, simplex roller chain-driven oil pump, cast aluminium alloy baffled oil sump
cylinder head & valvetrain
cast aluminium alloy; two valves per cylinder, 8 valves total, bucket tappets, timing belt-driven single overhead camshaft (SOHC)
aspiration
hot-wire mass air flow (MAF) sensor, hot-wire Manifold Absolute Pressure (MAP) sensor, cast aluminium alloy intake manifold, Garrett, KKK or BorgWarner variable turbine geometry turbocharger (VTG) operated by a vacuum control solenoid, side/front-mounted intercooler (S/FMIC), water-cooled exhaust gas recirculation (EGR), cast iron exhaust manifold. The 116 PS (85 kW; 114 bhp) engines use a GT1749V Turbocharger, All 130 PS (96 kW; 128 bhp) engines use the GT1749VA turbo which has a larger compressor wheel than the GT1749V turbo. The 150 PS (110 kW; 148 bhp) engines use a GT1749VB Turbo which has a larger Compressor and Exhaust Wheel. The VA version will spool faster however the VB version will produce more boost without becoming damaged.
fuel system & engine management
Pumpe Düse (PD) direct injection (DI): engine-driven vane-type low-pressure fuel lift pump, four camshaft-actuated (via roller rocker arms) high-pressure Bosch 1,920 bar (27,850 psi) Unit Injectors with solenoid valve injection nozzles. There are 4 Version of Injectors, AJ Injectors fitted to AJM/AUY Coded engines can flow up to 465cc/min, BA/AR Injectors fitted to AVF/AWX/ASZ variants may flow up to a nominal of 520cc/min, and AL Injectors may flow at a maximum of 550cc/min. Bosch EDC 15, EDC 16 or EDC 17 engine control units (ECU) with altitude compensation are used, measured via the mass airflow sensor. The Bosch EDC17 is not used commonly with the 1.9 PD TDI engines. The EDC15 is a common ECU to practice with for tuners, The EDC16 was used in the MK5 Generation of Volkswagen cars to be able to use Diesel Particulate Filters (DPF).
EWG-rated power & torque outputs, ID codes, applications
43 kW (58 PS; 58 bhp) — BEU: Volkswagen Industrial Motor (11/02->)
53 kW (72 PS; 71 bhp) — BJC: Volkswagen Industrial Motor (11/03->)
63 kW (86 PS; 84 bhp) — AVM: Volkswagen Industrial Motor (11/00->)
DIN-rated power & torque outputs, ID codes, applications
55 kW (75 PS; 74 bhp) at 4,000 rpm; 210 N⋅m (155 lbf⋅ft) at 1,900 rpm — BSU

Volkswagen Caddy Mk3 (09/05->)

66 kW (90 PS; 89 bhp) at 4,000 rpm; 210 N⋅m (155 lbf⋅ft) at 1,800−2,500 rpm — BRU, BXF, BXJ

SEAT Ibiza Mk4 (BXJ: 06/08->), SEAT León 1P (Mk2) (BXF: 06/07->), SEAT Altea (BXF: 08/09->), Volkswagen Golf Mk5 (BRU: 05/04-02/06, BXF: 02/06-11/08, BXJ: 11/07-11/08), VW Golf Plus (BXF: 05/07-12/08, BXJ: 11/07-12/08), Volkswagen Touran (BRU: 11/04-02/06, BXF: 02/06->, BXJ: 06/06->)

66 kW (90 PS; 89 bhp) at 4,000 rpm; 240 N⋅m (177 lbf⋅ft) at 1,900 rpm — ANU

Ford Galaxy, SEAT Alhambra (06/00->), Volkswagen Sharan (03/99->)

74 kW (101 PS; 99 bhp) at 4,000 rpm; 240 N⋅m (177 lbf⋅ft) at 1,800–2,400 rpm — ATD, AXR, BEW, BMT

Audi 8L A3 (Mk1) (ATD: 01/01-06/03, AXR: 11/01-06/03), SEAT Ibiza Mk3 (ATD: 09/01->, AXR: 05/05-11/09, BMT: 09/06-11/09), SEAT Córdoba Mk2 (ATD: 09/02->, AXR: 05/05->, BMT: 06/06-11/09), SEAT León 1M (Mk1) (AXR: 10/05-06/06), Škoda Fabia 6Y (Mk1) (ATD: 01/00-10/05, AXR: 10/05-12/07), Škoda Roomster (AXR: 03/06-05/06), Škoda Octavia 1U (Mk1) (ATD: 08/00-01/06, AXR: 10/05->), Volkswagen Polo Mk4 (ATD/AXR: 11/01->, BMT: 05/06->), Volkswagen Golf Mk4 (ATD: 02/00-06/06, AXR: 05/01-06/06), VW Bora/Jetta Mk4 (ATD: 05/00-05/06, AXR: 05/01-??/??, BEW: 07/03-??/??), Volkswagen Golf Mk5 (BEW: 08/03-??/??), VW Jetta Mk5 (AXR: 06/07-??/??), Volkswagen New Beetle (ATD: 10/00-??/??, AXR: 06/03-??/??, BEW: 07/03-??/??)

74 kW (101 PS; 99 bhp) at 4,000 rpm; 250 N⋅m (184 lbf⋅ft) at 1,900 rpm — AVB, AVQ

Audi B6 A4 (AVB: 04/01-05/04), Škoda Superb 3U (Mk1) (AVB: 06/02-10/05), Volkswagen Touran (AVQ: 02/03-05/04), VW Passat B5 (AVB: 02/00-05/05)

77 kW (105 PS; 103 bhp) at 4,000 rpm; 240 N⋅m (177 lbf⋅ft) at 1,800 rpm — BSW

Škoda Fabia 5J (Mk2) (04/07->), Škoda Roomster (05/06->), Volkswagen New Beetle (07/03->)

77 kW (105 PS; 103 bhp) at 4,000 rpm; 250 N⋅m (184 lbf⋅ft) at 1,900 rpm — BJB, BKC, BLS, BSV, BXE

Audi 8P A3 (Mk2) (BKC: 06/03-05/06, BLS: 10/05-05/10, BXE: 06/06-05/10), SEAT Ibiza 6J (Mk4) (BLS: 02/08->), SEAT León 1P (Mk2) (BKC: 07/05-02/06, BLS: 11/05->, BXE: 02/06->), SEAT Altea (BJB: 04/04-09/05, BKC: 04/04-05/06, BLS: 10/05->, BXE: 02/06->), SEAT Toledo Mk3 (BJB: 09/04-09/05, BKC: 09/04-02/06, BLS: 10/05-09/09, BXE: 02/06->), Škoda Fabia 5J (Mk2) (BLS: 04/07->), Škoda Roomster (BLS: 11/06->), Škoda Octavia 1Z (Mk2) (BJB: 02/04->, BKC: 05/04-02/06, BXE: 03/06->, BLS: 05/06->), Škoda Superb 3U (Mk1) (BSV: 10/05-05/07, BLS/BXE: 03/08->), Volkswagen Golf Mk5 (BKC: 10/03-07/07, BLS: 06/05->, BXE: 05/07->), VW Jetta Mk5 (BKC: 05/05-??/09, BLS: 08/05-??/09, BXE: 02/06-??/09), VW Golf Plus (BLS: 05/07-12/08, BXE: 05/07-01/09), Volkswagen Touran (BKC: 08/03-02/06, BLS: 06/05->, BXE: 02/06->), VW Passat B6 (BKC: 03/05-02/06, BLS: 06/05-11/08, BXE: 02/06-11/08), Volkswagen Caddy Mk3 (BJB: 02/04->, BLS: 06/05->)

85 kW (116 PS; 114 bhp) at 4,000 rpm; 250 N⋅m (184 lbf⋅ft) at 1,900 rpm — BPZ

Škoda Superb 3U (Mk1) (01/07-03/08)

85 kW (116 PS; 114 bhp) at 4,000 rpm; 285 N⋅m (210 lbf⋅ft) at 1,900 rpm — AJM

Audi B5 A4 (08/98-09/01), Audi C5 A6 (01/98-04/01), Volkswagen Golf Mk4 (05/99-04/02), VW Bora/Jetta Mk4 (11/98-07/01), VW Passat B5 (01/99-12/99)

85 kW (116 PS; 114 bhp) at 4,000 rpm; 310 N⋅m (229 lbf⋅ft) at 1,900 rpm — ATJ, AUY, BVK

Audi B5 A4 (ATJ: 01/00-09/01), Ford Galaxy Mk1, SEAT Alhambra (AUY: 06/00->, BVK: 11/05-05/08), Volkswagen Golf Mk4 (AUY: 01/00-07/01), VW Bora/Jetta Mk4 (AUY: 05/00-07/01), VW Passat B5 (ATJ: 01/00-08/00), Volkswagen Sharan (AUY: 04/00->, BVK: 11/05->)

96 kW (131 PS; 129 bhp) at 4,000 rpm; 285 N⋅m (210 lbf⋅ft) at 1,750–2,500 rpm — AWX

Audi B6 A4 (12/00-06/03), Audi C5 A6 (06/01-01/05), Škoda Superb 3U (Mk1) (12/01-03/08), VW Passat B5 (10/00-05/05)

96 kW (131 PS; 129 bhp) at 4,000 rpm; 310 N⋅m (229 lbf⋅ft) at 1,900 rpm — ASZ, AVF, BLT

Audi 8L A3 (Mk1) (ASZ: 05/00-06/03), Audi B6 A4 (AVF: 11/00-12/04), Audi C5 A6 (AVF: 06/01-01/05), Ford Galaxy Mk1, SEAT Ibiza Mk3 (ASZ: 11/01->, BLT: 05/05-07/09), SEAT Córdoba Mk2 (ASZ: 10/02->, BLT: 05/05->), SEAT León Mk1 (1M) (ASZ: 05/03-06/06), SEAT Toledo Mk2 (ASZ: 05/03-06/06), SEAT Alhambra (ASZ: 11/02->), Škoda Fabia Mk1 (6Y) (ASZ: 06/03-10/05, BLT: 10/05-04/07), Škoda Octavia 1U (Mk1) (ASZ: 09/02-09/04), Škoda Superb 3U (Mk1) (AVF: 01/04-03/08), Volkswagen Polo Mk4 (ASZ: 11/03->, BLT: 05/04->), Volkswagen Golf Mk4 (ASZ: 04/01-05/06), VW Bora/Jetta Mk4 (ASZ: 04/01-05/05), VW Passat B5 (AVF: 10/00-05/05), Volkswagen Sharan (ASZ: 11/02->)

110 kW (150 PS; 148 bhp) at 4,000 rpm; 320 N⋅m (236 lbf⋅ft) at 1,900 rpm — ARL, BTB

Ford Galaxy Mk1, SEAT León Mk1 (1M) (ARL: 09/00-12/05), SEAT Toledo Mk2 (ARL: 10/00-07/04), SEAT Alhambra (BTB: 06/05-05/07), Volkswagen Golf Mk4 (ARL: 09/00-05/06), VW Bora/Jetta Mk4 (ARL: 09/00-05/05), Volkswagen Sharan (BTB: 01/05-05/07)

118 kW (160 PS; 158 bhp) at 3,750 rpm; 330 N⋅m (243 lbf⋅ft) at 1,900 rpm — BPX, BUK

SEAT Ibiza Mk3 (BPX: 03/04->, BUK: 11/05-12/08) (engine exclusively developed by Audi for SEAT Sport)

reference
1.9 litre TDI engine with Pump Düse (PDF), Auburn Hills, MI, USA: Volkswagen of America, Inc, October 2003, Self-Study Program – Course Number 841303

==== awards ====
was winner of the "1.8-litre to 2.0-litre" category in the 1999 annual competition for International Engine of the Year

Origins: All 1896 ccm four cylinder engines are derived from the 2461 ccm 5 cylinder Audi- engine, VW just cut off one 492,1 ccm cylinder.

=== 2.0 R4 8v SDI PD 51-55kW ===
Origins
Motor type: EA 188 / All R4 1968 ccm four cylinder engines are derived from the R5 2461 ccm 5 cylinder Audi- engine, VW just cut off one 492,1 ccm cylinder.

identification
parts code prefix: 038
engine configuration & engine displacement
inline four-cylinder (R4/I4) Suction Diesel Injection (SDI); 1,968 cc (120.1 cu in), bore x stroke: 81.0 mm × 95.5 mm (3.19 in × 3.76 in), stroke ratio: 0.85:1 – undersquare/long stroke, 492.1 cc per cylinder, compression ratio: 19.0:1
cylinder block & crankcase
grey cast iron; five main bearings, die-forged steel crankshaft
cylinder head & valvetrain
cast aluminium alloy; two valves per cylinder, 8 valves total, timing belt driven single overhead camshaft (SOHC)
fuel system & engine management
Pumpe Düse (PD) Unit Injector direct injection (DI)
DIN-rated power & torque outputs, ID codes
51 kW (69 PS; 68 bhp) at 4,200 rpm; 140 N⋅m (103 lbf⋅ft) at 2,200–2,400 rpm — Volkswagen Caddy Mk3: BDJ, BST
55 kW (75 PS; 74 bhp) at 4,200 rpm; 140 N⋅m (103 lbf⋅ft) at 2,200–2,400 rpm — Volkswagen Golf Mk5: BDK

=== 2.0 R4 8v TDI PD 47-103kW ===
identification
Motor type: EA 188 / parts code prefix: ???
engine configuration & engine displacement
inline four-cylinder (R4/I4) Turbocharged Direct Injection (TDI) turbodiesel; 1,968 cc (120.1 cu in); bore x stroke: 81.0 mm × 95.5 mm (3.19 in × 3.76 in), stroke ratio: 0.85:1 – undersquare/long-stroke, 492.1 cc per cylinder; compression ratio: 18.5:1
cylinder block & crankcase
grey cast iron; five main bearings, die-forged steel crankshaft, fracture-split forged steel connecting rods
cylinder head & valvetrain
cast aluminium alloy; two valves per cylinder, 8 valves total, timing belt driven single overhead camshaft (SOHC)
aspiration
turbocharger, intercooler
fuel system & engine management
Pumpe Düse (PD) direct injection (DI): engine-driven vane-type low-pressure fuel lift pump, four camshaft-actuated (via roller rocker arms) high-pressure Bosch 2,200–2,400 bar (31,910–34,810 psi) Unit Injectors with solenoid valve injection nozzles, Bosch EDC 16 or EDC 17 or Siemens VDO SIMOS PPD1 electronic engine control unit (ECU) with altitude compensation, EU4 compliant
exhaust system
diesel particulate filter (DPF) (not on Industrial variants)
EWG-rated power & torque outputs, ID codes, applications
47 kW (64 PS; 63 bhp) at 3,000 rpm; 200 N⋅m (148 lbf⋅ft) at 1,750 rpm — Volkswagen Industrial Motor – 447 (CBH: 05/07->)
55 kW (75 PS; 74 bhp) — Volkswagen Industrial Motor – 455 (CBJ: 05/07->)
63 kW (86 PS; 84 bhp) at 3,000 rpm; 250 N⋅m (184 lbf⋅ft) at 1,750 rpm — Volkswagen Industrial Motor – 463
74 kW (101 PS; 99 bhp) at 3,000 rpm; 285 N⋅m (210 lbf⋅ft) at 1,750 rpm — Volkswagen Industrial Motor – 474 (CBK: 01/07->)
DIN-rated power & torque outputs, ID codes
100 kW (136 PS; 134 bhp) at 4,000 rpm; 310 N⋅m (229 lbf⋅ft) at 1900 rpm — BGW, BHW
103 kW (140 PS; 138 bhp) at 4,000 rpm; 320 N⋅m (236 lbf⋅ft) at 1,750-2500 rpm — BMM and BMP Transverse, BPW Longitudinal
applications
Volkswagen Passat (B5), Volkswagen Golf Mk5, Volkswagen Eos, VW Jetta A5, Volkswagen Touran, Volkswagen Tiguan, VW Passat B6, Audi 8P A3, Audi B7 A4, SEAT Leon, SEAT Altea and XL, SEAT Toledo, Škoda Octavia, Škoda Superb, Volkswagen Industrial Motor, Jeep Patriot, Mitsubishi Outlander, Mitsubishi Grandis
references
"New VW Passat in depth". WorldCarFans.com. Volkswagen AG. 4 March 2005. "The new TDI 2.0 Industrial Engines" (PDF), mi-uk.com, Volkswagen AG, April 2007, archived from the original (PDF) on 14 July 2011

=== 2.0 R4 16v TDI PD 100-125 kW ===
Some models are fitted with a diesel particulate filter. According to Audi (UK) 'TDV' stands for Technology Development Vehicle. TDV denotes that a diesel particulate filter is present on the Audi in question but the vehicle was produced just prior to (or during) the legislation process regarding DPFs. The abbreviation 'DPF' was not yet officially in existence so Audi used the 'TDV' letters to identify the diesel particulate filter.

This Pumpe Düse (PD) TDI engine was introduced to replace the older higher-powered versions of the 1.9 TDI. It is the first four-cylinder 16-valve double overhead camshaft (DOHC) Turbocharged Direct Injection (TDI) engine made by Volkswagen Group.

identification
Motor type: EA 188 / parts code prefix: 038
engine configuration & engine displacement
inline four-cylinder (R4/I4) Turbocharged Direct Injection (TDI) turbodiesel; 1,968 cc (120.1 cu in); bore x stroke: 81.0 mm × 95.5 mm (3.19 in × 3.76 in), stroke ratio: 0.85:1 – undersquare/long-stroke, 492.1 cc per cylinder; compression ratio: 18.5:1
cylinder block & crankcase
grey cast iron; five main bearings, die-forged steel crankshaft, fracture-split forged steel connecting rods, cast aluminium alloy oil sump
cylinder head & valvetrain
cast aluminium alloy; four valves per cylinder, 16 valves total, timing belt-driven double overhead camshaft (DOHC)
aspiration
hot-film air mass meter, Garrett turbocharger integrated into cast iron exhaust manifold, sandwiched central front-mounted intercooler (FMIC)
fuel system & engine management
Pumpe Düse (PD) direct injection (DI): engine-driven vane-type low-pressure fuel lift pump, four camshaft-actuated (via roller rocker arms) high-pressure 2,200–2,400 bar (31,910–34,810 psi) Unit Injectors with solenoid valve injection nozzles Bosch or Unit Injectors with piezo valve injection nozzles Siemens VDO (engines 125 kW and BKP), Bosch EDC 16 or EDC 17 or Siemens VDO SIMOS PPD1 electronic engine control unit (ECU) with altitude compensation, EU4 compliant
exhaust system
water-cooled exhaust gas recirculation (EGR), diesel particulate filter (DPF) (only on 125 kW and TDV (Technology Development Vehicle) denoted models )
DIN-rated power & torque outputs, ID codes
100 kW (136 PS; 134 bhp) — AZV, BMA
103 kW (140 PS; 138 bhp) — BKD, BKP, BRE
125 kW (170 PS; 168 bhp) at 4,200 rpm; 350 N⋅m (258 lbf⋅ft) at 1,800-2,500 rpm — BMN, BMR, BRD
applications
Audi 8P A3, Audi B7 A4, Audi B8 A4, Audi C6 A6, Jeep Patriot 2.0CRD (BKD: 09/07) SEAT León Mk2, Škoda Octavia (BKD: 11/08->), Škoda Superb (BKD: 01/09->), Volkswagen Golf Mk5, VW Jetta Mk5, Volkswagen Touran, VW Passat B6, Mitsubishi Lancer, Mitsubishi Grandis, Mitsubishi Outlander (BWC), Chrysler Sebring, Chrysler Sebring (convertible), Dodge Avenger, Dodge Caliber (MY07 BKD, MY08 BMR), Dodge Journey, Jeep Compass, Jeep Patriot
reference
"New VW Passat in depth". WorldCarFans.com. Volkswagen AG. 4 March 2005. "Self study programme 352: Unit Injectors with piezo valves – Design and function" (PDF). Volkswagen AG. "Self study programme 316: The 2.0 ltr. [sic] TDI engine" (PDF). Volkswagen AG.

=== 1.5 R4 16v TDI CR 66-81kW ===
identification
Motor type: EA 189 /parts code prefix: 03L
engine configuration & engine displacement
inline four-cylinder (R4/I4) Turbocharged Direct Injection (TDI) turbodiesel; 1,498 cc (91.4 cu in); bore x stroke: 77 mm × 80.5 mm (3.03 in × 3.17 in), stroke ratio: 0.96:1 – 'undersquare engine', 374.5 cc per cylinder.

cylinder block & crankcase
grey cast iron; five main bearings, die-forged steel crankshaft

cylinder head & valvetrain
cast aluminium alloy; four valves per cylinder, 16 valves total, double overhead camshaft (DOHC)
aspiration
turbocharger, intercooler, water-cooled exhaust gas recirculation (EGR)
fuel system & engine management
common rail (CR) direct injection (DI) with eight-nozzle output piezo element injectors, rail pressure up to 1,600 bar (23,210 psi), BS IV emissions standard (lacks exhaust DPF), SIMOS PCR 2.1 ecu
DIN-rated power & torque outputs, ID codes
66 kW (90 PS; 89 bhp) at 4,200 rpm; 230 N⋅m (170 lbf⋅ft) at 1,500-2,500 rpm — CWXA (Polo TDI)
77 kW (105 PS; 104bhp) at 4,400 rpm; 250 N⋅m (184 lbf⋅ft) at 1,500-2,500 rpm — CWXB (pre-2017 GT TDI)
81 kW (110 PS; 109 bhp) at 4,000 rpm; 250 N⋅m (184 lbf⋅ft) at 1,500-3,000 rpm — CWXC (GT TDI)
applications
Škoda Rapid (India), Volkswagen Polo Mk5, Volkswagen Ameo, Volkswagen Vento

=== 1.6 R4 16v TDI CR 55-85kW ===
identification
Motor type: EA 189 /parts code prefix: 03L
engine configuration & engine displacement
inline four-cylinder (R4/I4) Turbocharged Direct Injection (TDI) turbodiesel; 1,598 cc (97.5 cu in); bore x stroke: 79.5 mm × 80.5 mm (3.13 in × 3.17 in), stroke ratio: 0.99:1 – 'square engine', 399.5 cc per cylinder, compression ratio: 16.5:1

cylinder block & crankcase
grey cast iron; five main bearings, die-forged steel crankshaft

cylinder head & valvetrain
cast aluminium alloy; four valves per cylinder, 16 valves total, double overhead camshaft (DOHC)
aspiration
turbocharger, intercooler, water-cooled exhaust gas recirculation (EGR)
fuel system & engine management
common rail (CR) direct injection (DI) with eight-nozzle output piezo element injectors, rail pressure up to 1,600 bar (23,210 psi), European EU5 emissions standard
DIN-rated power & torque outputs, ID codes
55 kW (75 PS; 74 bhp) at 4,000 rpm; 195 N⋅m (144 lbf⋅ft) at 1,500-2,500 rpm — CAYA (Polo and Fabia only)
55 kW (75 PS; 74 bhp) at 3,000-4,000 rpm; 225 N⋅m (166 lbf⋅ft) at 1,500-2,250 rpm — CAYE (Caddy only)
66 kW (90 PS; 89 bhp) at 4,200 rpm; 230 N⋅m (170 lbf⋅ft) at 1,500-2,500 rpm — CAYB
75 kW (102 PS; 101 bhp) at 4,400 rpm; 250 N⋅m (184 lbf⋅ft) at 1,500-2,500 rpm — CAYD (Caddy only)
77 kW (105 PS; 103 bhp) at 4,400 rpm; 250 N⋅m (184 lbf⋅ft) at 1,500-2,500 rpm — CAYC
85 kW (116 PS; 114 bhp) at 4,400 rpm; 250 N⋅m (184 lbf⋅ft) at 2,000-2,500 rpm — CEKA (Mexico only)
applications
SEAT Ibiza Mk4, SEAT Ibiza Mk5, SEAT León Mk2, SEAT Altea, SEAT Altea XL, Škoda Fabia Mk2, Škoda Roomster, Škoda Octavia Mk2, Škoda Superb, Škoda Rapid (2012), Škoda Rapid (India), Volkswagen Polo Mk5, Volkswagen Golf Mk6, Volkswagen Golf Mk7, Volkswagen Golf Plus, Volkswagen Golf Variant, Volkswagen Touran, Audi A1, Audi A3, Volkswagen Caddy, Volkswagen Vento, Volkswagen Jetta, Volkswagen Passat (B6), Volkswagen Passat (B7)
reference
"VW presents new 1.2 litre TSI and 1.6 litre TDI engines for Golf and Polo". WorldCarFans.com. Volkswagen AG. 13 May 2009.

=== 2.0 R4 16v TDI CR 81-132kW ===
The EA189 engine is the focus of the Volkswagen emissions scandal, widely known as Dieselgate.

identification
Motor type: EA189 / parts code prefix: 03L, ID codes: CAGA, CAGC, CAHA, CBEA, CBAB, CFFB, CFFD, CBBB, CBDB, CBDC, CEGA, CFGB, CFGC, CFCA, CFJA, CFJB, CJAA, CLJA, CKRA, CRMB
engine configuration & engine displacement
inline four-cylinder (R4/I4) Turbocharged Direct Injection (TDI) turbodiesel; 1,968 cc (120.1 cu in);bore x stroke: 81.0 mm × 95.5 mm (3.19 in × 3.76 in), stroke ratio: 0.85:1 – undersquare/long-stroke, 492.1 cc per cylinder, compression ratio: 18:1 (103 kW), 16.5:1 (125 kW)
cylinder block & crankcase
grey cast iron; five main bearings, die-forged steel crankshaft, fracture-split forged steel connecting rods, two counter-rotating gear-driven balance shafts turning at half crankshaft speed, Alcan or Federal-Mogul pistons, cast aluminium alloy oil sump
cylinder head & valvetrain
cast aluminium alloy; four valves per cylinder, 16 valves total, low-friction roller finger cam followers with automatic hydraulic valve clearance compensation, timing belt and gear-driven (relay method: belt drives exhaust camshaft from front of engine, inlet camshaft is driven at rear of engine by gear from exhaust camshaft) double overhead camshaft (DOHC)
aspiration
hot-film air mass meter, electronically regulated variable geometry turbocharger integrated into cast iron exhaust manifold, central front-mounted intercooler (FMIC)
aspiration (147 kW)
twin registered turbochargers with different diameters
fuel system & engine management
low-pressure fuel tank mounted fuel lift pump with underfloor electric fuel relay pump, timing belt-driven high-pressure injection pump delivering up to 1,850 bar (26,830 psi) pressure for the common rail (CR) fuel rail, direct injection (DI) with eight-nozzle output piezo fuel injectors; Bosch EDC 17 electronic engine control unit (ECU)
exhaust system
water-cooled exhaust gas recirculation (EGR), catalytic converter, diesel particulate filter (DPF), nitrogen oxide catalytic converter, sulphur catalytic converter.
DIN-rated power & torque outputs, ID codes, applications
81 kW (110 PS; 109 bhp) at 4,200 rpm; 250 N⋅m (184 lbf⋅ft) at 1,500–2,500 rpm — CBDC, CFFD
88 kW (120 PS; 118 bhp) at 4,000 rpm; 290 N⋅m (214 lbf⋅ft) at 1,750–2,500 rpm — CAGC SEAT Exeo (09/09->)
100 kW (136 PS; 134 bhp) — CAGB(AUDI A6 C6 CR)
103 kW (140 PS; 138 bhp) at 3,750-4,150 rpm; 320 N⋅m (236 lbf⋅ft) at 1,750–2,800 rpm — CFHC, CBEA, CBAB, CFFB Volkswagen Passat B7, CBDB, CJAA Volkswagen Golf Mk6, Volkswagen Sharan (7N)
105 kW (143 PS; 141 bhp) at 4,200 rpm; 320 N⋅m (236 lbf⋅ft) at 1,750–2,500 rpm — Audi B8 A4, Audi Q5, SEAT Exeo (CAGA: 12/08->, CRMB: 06/10-03/13)
110 kW (150 PS; 148 bhp) at 3,500 rpm; 320 N⋅m (236 lbf⋅ft) at 1,750–3,000 rpm — CRBC Audi A3, Golf VII, Golf VIII, SEAT Leon
125 kW (170 PS; 168 bhp) at 4,200 rpm; 350 N⋅m (258 lbf⋅ft) at 1,750–2,500 rpm — CAHA Audi A6 C6 (facelift), Audi A5 8T, CBBB Volkswagen Passat CC, CFGB Audi TT 2.0 TDI quattro, Audi 8P A3, Volkswagen Tiguan 5N, Volkswagen Golf Mk6, Škoda Superb 2, Škoda Octavia RS TDI (CEGA: 2008->), SEAT Exeo (CAHA: 02/09->), CEGA, CFJA SEAT Leon
130 kW (177 PS; 174 bhp) at 4,200 rpm; 380 N⋅m (280 lbf⋅ft) at 1,750–2,500 rpm— CGLC Audi A4, Audi A5, Audi A6 C7, CFJB Volkswagen Touran, CFGC Audi Q3, Volkswagen Passat B7
132 kW (179 PS; 177 bhp) at 4,000 rpm; 400 N⋅m (295 lbf⋅ft) at 1,500–2,000 rpm — CFCA Volkswagen Transporter (T5) GP biturbo
applications
Audi TT Mk2 2.0 TDI quattro (CBBB: 06/08-05/10), Audi 8P A3 (CBBB: 07/08->), Audi B8 A4, Audi Q5, SEAT Leon Mk2 (1P), SEAT Altea, SEAT Toledo Mk3 (5P), SEAT Exeo, Škoda Octavia Mk2 (1Z) (125 kW), Škoda Superb Mk2 (3T) (103/125 kW), Škoda Yeti (81/103/125 kW), Volkswagen Golf Mk6, VW Jetta Mk5 TDI CleanDiesel (103 kW), Volkswagen Sharan (7N), Volkswagen Tiguan, Volkswagen Passat CC, Volkswagen Passat, Volkswagen Transporter (T5)
references
"50 mpg-plus Audi diesel sports car cleans up in Geneva". Audi.co.uk. Audi UK. 28 February 2008. Archived from the original on 1 August 2010. "Audi's new TT TDI is going on sale this spring in Europe". Green.AutoBlog.com. AUDI AG. 28 April 2008.

== Four-cylinder PERKINS and MWM diesels ==
The first engine was bought from Perkins while the latter was produced by MWM International Motores Brasil, and are the TCA 4.07 type

=== 2.7 R4 D 48kW ===
identification
parts code prefix: 061; ID code: CG
engine configuration & engine displacement
inline four-cylinder (R4/I4) diesel (D); 2,702 cc (164.9 cu in); bore x stroke: 92.0 mm × 101.6 mm (3.62 in × 4.00 in), stroke ratio: 0.91:1 – undersquare/long-stroke, 675.4 cc per cylinder, compression ratio: 21.0:1
cylinder block & crankcase
gray cast iron; five main bearings; die–forged steel crankshaft, gear-driven camshaft, cast aluminium alloy oil sump
cylinder head & valvetrain
????; overhead valve (OHV): two valves per cylinder each with two concentric valve springs, 8 valves total, solid cam followers with pushrods, rocker arms with manual tappet adjustment
fuel system
camshaft-actuated mechanical fuel lift pump, gear-driven mechanical rotary injection pump with indirect fuel injection into pre-combustion chamber
DIN-rated power & torque output
48 kW (65 PS; 64 bhp) at 3,600 rpm; 152 N⋅m (112 lbf⋅ft) at 2,300 rpm
application
Volkswagen LT (01/76-11/82)

=== 2.8 R4 12v TDI 92-116kW ===
identification
parts code prefix: 062; ID codes: AGK, ATA, AUH, BCQ
engine configuration & engine displacement
inline four-cylinder (R4/I4) Turbocharged Direct Injection (TDI) turbodiesel; 2,798 cc (170.7 cu in); bore x stroke: 93.0 mm × 103.0 mm (3.66 in × 4.06 in), stroke ratio: 0.90:1 – undersquare/long-stroke, 699.7 cc per cylinder, compression ratio: 19.1:1
cylinder block & crankcase
gray cast iron; five main bearings; die–forged steel crankshaft
cylinder head & valvetrain
cast aluminium alloy; three valves per cylinder (two inlet, one exhaust), 12 valves total, finger cam followers, gear-driven single overhead camshaft (SOHC)
aspiration
air mass meter, cast aluminium alloy inlet manifold, cast iron exhaust manifold, turbocharger, intercooler
fuel system
Bosch VE mechanical rotary injection pump with direct injection (DI); AUH and BCQ only with Bosch Common-Rail;exhaust gas recirculation (BCQ only)
DIN-rated power & torque outputs
92 kW (125 PS; 123 bhp) — AGK (07/97-12/98)
96 kW (131 PS; 129 bhp) — ATA (01/99-01/02)
116 kW (158 PS; 156 bhp) — AUH (02/02-07/06), BCQ (05/02-07/06)
application
Volkswagen LT

== Five-cylinder diesels ==
=== 2.0 R5 D 51kW ===
identification
parts code prefix: ???, ID code: CN
engine configuration & engine displacement
inline five engine (R5/I5); 1,986 cc (121.2 cu in); bore x stroke 76.5 mm × 86.4 mm (3.01 in × 3.40 in), stroke ratio: 0.89:1 – undersquare/long-stroke, 397.1 cc per cylinder; compression ratio: 22.0:1
cylinder block & crankcase
gray cast iron; six main bearings
cylinder head & valvetrain
cast aluminium alloy; two valves per cylinder, single overhead camshaft (SOHC)
aspiration
cast aluminium intake manifold, cast iron exhaust manifold
fuel system
mechanical distributor injection pump, indirect fuel injection into whirl chamber
DIN-rated power & torque output
51 kW (69 PS; 68 bhp) at 4,400 rpm; 140 N⋅m (103 lbf⋅ft) at 2,800 rpm
application
Audi 100 (10/78-7/89), Volvo 240

=== 2.0 R5 TD 66kW ===
identification
parts code prefix: ???, ID code: DE
engine configuration & engine displacement
inline five engine (R5/I5) turbodiesel (TD); 1,986 cc (121.2 cu in); bore x stroke 76.5 mm × 86.4 mm (3.01 in × 3.40 in), stroke ratio: 0.89:1 – undersquare/long-stroke, 397.1 cc per cylinder, compression ratio: 23.0:1
cylinder block & crankcase
gray cast iron; six main bearings
cylinder head & valvetrain
cast aluminium alloy; two valves per cylinder, mechanical valve-lifters, single overhead camshaft (SOHC)
aspiration
cast aluminium intake manifold, cast iron exhaust manifold, turbocharger
fuel system
mechanical distributor injection pump, indirect fuel injection into whirl chamber
DIN-rated power & torque output
66 kW (90 PS; 89 bhp) at ?,??? rpm
application
Audi 100 (7/81-12/87)

=== 2.0 R5 TD 75kW ===
identification
parts code prefix: ???, ID codes: NC, 694
engine configuration & engine displacement
inline five engine (R5/I5) turbodiesel (TD); 1,986 cc (121.2 cu in); bore x stroke 76.5 mm × 86.4 mm (3.01 in × 3.40 in), stroke ratio: 0.89:1 – undersquare/long-stroke, 397.1 cc per cylinder, compression ratio: 23.0:1
cylinder block & crankcase
gray cast iron; six main bearings
cylinder head & valvetrain
cast aluminium alloy; two valves per cylinder, hydraulic valve-play compensation, single overhead camshaft (SOHC)
aspiration
cast aluminium intake manifold, cast iron exhaust manifold, turbocharger, intercooler
fuel system
mechanical distributor injection pump, indirect fuel injection into whirl chamber
DIN-rated power & torque output
75 kW (102 PS; 101 bhp) at ?,??? rpm
applications
Audi 100 (NC: 03/88-12/90), Volkswagen Industrial Motor (694: 09/90-07/92)

=== 2.4 R5 D 55-60kW ===
identification
parts code prefix: 074, ID codes: 3D, AAB, AAS, ACP, AJA
engine configuration & engine displacement
inline five engine (R5/I5); 2,370 cc (144.6 cu in); bore x stroke: 79.5 mm × 95.5 mm (3.13 in × 3.76 in), stroke ratio: 0.83:1 – undersquare/long-stroke, 474.1 cc per cylinder, compression ratio 22.0:1
cylinder block & crankcase
gray cast iron; six main bearings
cylinder head & valvetrain
cast aluminium alloy; two valves per cylinder each with two concentric valve springs, 10 valves total, solid bucket tappets, timing belt-driven single overhead camshaft (SOHC)
aspiration
cast aluminium alloy intake manifold, cast iron exhaust manifold
fuel system
timing belt-driven Bosch mechanical distributor injection pump with electrical fuel cut-off, indirect fuel injection into whirl chamber
EWG-rated power outputs, ID codes & applications
55 kW (75 PS; 74 bhp) at ?,??? rpm — 751: Volkswagen Industrial Motor (09/83-06/93)
57 kW (77 PS; 76 bhp) at 3,700 rpm — ACP: Volkswagen Industrial Motor (07/92-08/94)
DIN-rated power & torque outputs, ID codes
55 kW (75 PS; 74 bhp) at 3,700 rpm; 160 N⋅m (118 lbf⋅ft) at 1,900-2,900 rpm — AJA (04/97-06/03)
57 kW (77 PS; 76 bhp) at 3,700 rpm; 164 N⋅m (121 lbf⋅ft) at 1,800 rpm — AAB (09/90-09/98), ACP (07/92-08/94)
60 kW (82 PS; 80 bhp) at 4,200 rpm; 160 N⋅m (118 lbf⋅ft) at 2,200 rpm — 3D, AAS
applications
Audi 100 (3D: 08/89-12/90, AAS: 05/91-07/94), Volkswagen Transporter (T4)

=== 2.5 R5 TDI 85-103kW ===
This engine was never offered in North America.

identification
parts code prefix: 046
engine configuration & engine displacement
inline five engine (R5/I5), Turbocharged Direct Injection (TDI) turbodiesel; 2,461 cc (150.2 cu in); bore x stroke: 81.0 mm × 95.5 mm (3.19 in × 3.76 in), stroke ratio: 0.85:1 – undersquare/long-stroke, 492.2 cc per cylinder, compression ratio: 20.5:1, viscous-coupled engine cooling fan
cylinder block & crankcase
gray cast iron; six main bearings
cylinder heads & valvetrain
cast aluminium alloy; two valves per cylinder, 10 valves total, sliding finger cam followers, automatic hydraulic valve clearance compensation, timing belt-driven single overhead camshaft (SOHC)
aspiration
vane type air mass meter, cast aluminium intake manifold, KKK K16 (early versions) or K14 (later versions) turbocharger, side-mounted intercooler (SMIC)
fuel system & engine management
timing belt driven Bosch VE (ABP) or VP37 (AAT, AEL) mechanical distributor-type injection pump with direct injection (DI); Bosch EDC electronic ECU
exhaust system
cast iron exhaust manifold, catalytic converter
DIN-rated power & torque outputs, ID codes
85 kW (116 PS; 114 bhp) at 4,000 rpm; 265 N⋅m (195 lbf⋅ft) at 2,250 rpm — ABP (K16 turbocharger, no air mass meter, no EGR, no catalytic converter)
85 kW (116 PS; 114 bhp) at 4,000 rpm; 265 N⋅m (195 lbf⋅ft) at 2,250 rpm — AAT (K16 turbocharger, up to 04/94)
85 kW (116 PS; 114 bhp) at 4,000 rpm; 265 N⋅m (195 lbf⋅ft) at 1,900 rpm — AAT (K14 turbocharger, 05/94 onwards)
103 kW (140 PS; 138 bhp) at 4,000 rpm; 290 N⋅m (214 lbf⋅ft) at 1,900 rpm — AEL (K14 turbocharger)
applications
Audi 100 (AAT: 08/91-07/94, ABP: 06/91-07/92, Audi C4 A6 (AAT: 06/94-10/97, AEL/D5252T: 10/94-10/97), Volvo 850, Volvo V70 Ph1

reference
ID and detail from ETKA and ELSA

== Six-cylinder diesels ==
=== 2.4 R6 D24 51-60kW ===
identification
parts code prefix: 075, 076
engine configuration & engine displacement
inline six (R6/I6) diesel (D); 2,383 cc (145.4 cu in); bore x stroke: 76.5 mm × 86.4 mm (3.01 in × 3.40 in), stroke ratio: 0.89:1 – undersquare/long-stroke, 397.1 cc per cylinder, compression ratio: 22.0:1
cylinder block & crankcase
gray cast iron; seven main bearings, die–forged steel crossplane crankshaft, pressed steel oil sump
cylinder head & valvetrain
cast aluminium alloy; two valves per cylinder each with two concentric valve springs, timing belt-driven single overhead camshaft (SOHC) directly acting on shim-adjustable bucket tappet valve lifters
aspiration
cast aluminium alloy intake manifold, two cast iron exhaust manifolds
fuel system
Bosch mechanical distributor injection pump, indirect fuel injection into whirl pre-combustion chamber
EWG-rated power & torque output, application, ID codes
55 kW (75 PS; 74 bhp) — Volkswagen Industrial Motor (761: 01/81-01/84, 751: 09/83-06/93)
DIN-rated power & torque outputs, ID codes
51 kW (69 PS; 68 bhp) — 1S, ACT
55 kW (75 PS; 74 bhp) at 4,000 rpm; 155 N⋅m (114 lbf⋅ft) at 2,800 rpm — CP, DW
60 kW (82 PS; 80 bhp) at 4,700 rpm; 145 N⋅m (107 lbf⋅ft) at 2,000 rpm — Volvo D24
applications
Volkswagen LT (CP: 08/78-11/82, DW: 12/82-07/92, 1S: 08/88-07/92, ACT: 08/92-12/95), Volvo 240, Volvo 740
reference
ID and detail from ETKA and Volvo pocket data booklet TP 0302035 7000.05.96 English

=== 2.4 R6 D24T 63-80kW ===
identification
parts code prefix: 075
engine configuration & engine displacement
inline six (R6/I6) turbodiesel (TD); 2,383 cc (145.4 cu in); bore x stroke: 76.5 mm × 86.4 mm (3.01 in × 3.40 in), stroke ratio: 0.89:1 – undersquare/long-stroke, 397.1 cc per cylinder, compression ratio: 22.0:1
cylinder block & crankcase
gray cast iron; seven main bearings, die–forged steel crossplane crankshaft, pressed steel oil sump
cylinder head & valvetrain
cast aluminium alloy; two valves per cylinder each with two concentric valve springs, timing belt-driven single overhead camshaft (SOHC) directly acting on shim-adjustable bucket tappet valve lifters
aspiration
cast aluminium alloy intake manifold, cast iron exhaust manifold, turbocharger
fuel system
Bosch mechanical distributor injection pump, indirect fuel injection into whirl pre-combustion chamber
EWG-rated power & torque output, application, ID code
66 kW (90 PS; 89 bhp) — Volkswagen Industrial Motor (752: 09/83-06/93)
DIN-rated power & torque outputs, ID codes
63 kW (86 PS; 84 bhp) at 4,000 rpm; 152 N⋅m (112 lbf⋅ft) at 2,500 rpm — ???
68 kW (92 PS; 91 bhp) — 1G
75 kW (102 PS; 101 bhp); 195 N⋅m (144 lbf⋅ft) — DV
79 kW (107 PS; 106 bhp) at 4,800 rpm; 190 N⋅m (140 lbf⋅ft) at 2,400 rpm — Volvo D24T (with EGR)
80 kW (109 PS; 107 bhp) at 4,800 rpm; 205 N⋅m (151 lbf⋅ft) at 2,500 rpm — Volvo D24T (non EGR)
applications
Volkswagen LT (DV: 12/82-07/92, 1G: 08/88-07/89), Volvo 740, Volvo 760, Volvo 940
reference
ID and detail from ETKA and Volvo pocket data booklet TP 0302035 7000.05.96 English

=== 2.4 R6 D24TIC 70-90kW ===
identification
parts code prefix: 075
engine configuration & engine displacement
inline six (R6/I6) turbodiesel (TD); 2,383 cc (145.4 cu in); bore x stroke: 76.5 mm × 86.4 mm (3.01 in × 3.40 in), stroke ratio: 0.89:1 – undersquare/long-stroke, 397.1 cc per cylinder, compression ratio: 23.0:1
cylinder block & crankcase
gray cast iron; seven main bearings, die–forged steel crossplane crankshaft, pressed steel oil sump
cylinder head & valvetrain
cast aluminium alloy; two valves per cylinder each with two concentric valve springs, timing belt-driven single overhead camshaft (SOHC) directly acting on shim-adjustable bucket tappet valve lifters
aspiration
cast aluminium alloy intake manifold, cast iron exhaust manifold, turbocharger, intercooler
fuel system
Bosch mechanical distributor injection pump, indirect fuel injection into whirl pre-combustion chamber
DIN-rated power & torque outputs, ID codes
70 kW (95 PS; 94 bhp) at 4,000 rpm; 220 N⋅m (162 lbf⋅ft) at 2,000 rpm — ACL
85 kW (116 PS; 114 bhp) at 4,000 rpm; 210 N⋅m (155 lbf⋅ft) at 2,400 rpm — ???
85 kW (116 PS; 114 bhp) at 4,000 rpm; 220 N⋅m (162 lbf⋅ft) at 2,400 rpm — ???
90 kW (122 PS; 121 bhp) at 4,600 rpm; 240 N⋅m (177 lbf⋅ft) at 2,500 rpm — Volvo D24TIC (with EGR)
90 kW (122 PS; 121 bhp) at 4,800 rpm; 235 N⋅m (173 lbf⋅ft) at 2,400 rpm — Volvo D24TIC (non EGR)
applications
Volkswagen LT (ACL: 08/91-12/95), Volvo 740, Volvo 760, Volvo 940
reference
ID and detail from ETKA and Volvo pocket data booklet TP 0302035 7000.05.96 English

=== 2.5 V6 24v TDI 110-132kW ===
This engine was never offered in North America.

identification
parts code prefix: 059
engine configuration & engine displacement
90° V6 engine, Turbocharged Direct Injection (TDI) turbodiesel; 2,496 cc (152.3 cu in); bore x stroke: 78.3 mm × 86.4 mm (3.08 in × 3.40 in), stroke ratio: 0.91:1 – undersquare/long-stroke, 416.0 cc per cylinder, compression ratio: 19.5:1, viscous-coupled engine cooling fan
cylinder block & crankcase
compacted vermicular graphite cast iron (GJV/CGI); four main bearings, die–forged steel crossplane crankshaft with split crankpins, light alloy pistons (Kolbenschmidt on 120 kW, Mahle or Kolbenschmidt on 132 kW), simplex roller chain-driven oil pump, two-part multi-baffled cast aluminium alloy oil sump, oil filter module (incorporating oil separator) mounted within the 'vee'
cylinder heads & valvetrain
cast aluminium alloy; four valves per cylinder, 24 valves total, initially: sliding finger cam followers, later: low-friction roller finger cam followers, both with automatic hydraulic valve clearance compensation, dual timing belt relay-driven 2x double overhead camshaft (2xDOHC – two overhead camshafts per cylinder bank – 'quad cam', one timing belt driven from the crankshaft drives both inlet camshafts, the second belt relay-drives the exhaust camshafts from the inlet), dual inlet ports
aspiration
hot-film air mass meter, one turbocharger mounted within the 'vee', two all-alloy side-mounted intercoolers (SMICs), two cast alloy intake manifolds
fuel system & engine management
timing belt driven Bosch VE VP44 mechanical distributor-type injection pump with direct injection (DI); early variants with proprietary electronic engine control unit (ECU) and European EU3 emissions compliant; later variants with water-cooled exhaust gas recirculation (EGR), Bosch EDC15 electronic ECU and EU4
exhaust system
cast iron exhaust manifolds, catalytic converter
DIN-rated power & torque outputs, ID codes
110 kW (150 PS; 148 hp) at ?,??? rpm; 310 N⋅m (229 lbf⋅ft) at 1,400 – 3,200 rpm — AFB, AKN
114 kW (155 PS; 153 hp) at ?,??? rpm; 310 N⋅m (229 lbf⋅ft) at 1,400 rpm — AYM
120 kW (163 PS; 161 hp) at 4,000 rpm; 310 N⋅m (229 lbf⋅ft) at 1,400 – 3,600 rpm — BCZ, BFC
120 kW (163 PS; 161 hp) at 4,000 rpm; 350 N⋅m (258 lbf⋅ft) at 1,500 – 3,000 rpm — BDG
132 kW (179 PS; 177 hp) at 4,000 rpm; 370 N⋅m (273 lbf⋅ft) at 1,500 – 2,500 rpm — AKE, BAU, BDH
applications
Audi A4 (AFB: 11/97-06/00, AKN: 07/98-09/01, AYM: 12/00-06/02, AKE: 12/00-05/03, BFC: 07/02-05/03, BAU/BDH: 06/03-12/04, BCZ: 06/03-12/05, BDG: 06/03-05/06),
Audi C5 A6 / Audi C5 allroad (AFB: 04/97-05/00, AKN: 10/98-05/01, AKE: 11/99-08/03, AYM: 06/01-06/02, BFC: 07/02-08/03, BDG/BDH: 02/03-01/05, BAU/BCZ: 02/03-08/05)
Audi D2 A8 (AFB: 06/97-06/00, AKN: 11/97-09/02, AKE: 11/99-09/02)
Škoda Superb B5 (AYM: 12/01-08/03, BDG: 08/03-03/08)
Volkswagen Passat (B5.5) (AFB: 08/98-08/00, AKN: 05/99-05/03, BAU/BDH: 01/03-05/05, BDG: 05/03-05/05)
reference
ID and detail from ETKA

==== awards ====
The 2.5 V6 TDI was winner of the "2.0-litre to 2.5-litre" category in the 1999 annual competition for International Engine of the Year

== Eight-cylinder diesels ==
=== 3.3 V8 32v TDI CR 165kW ===
identification
parts code prefix: 057.A; ID code: AKF
engine configuration & engine displacement
90° V8 engine, Turbocharged Direct Injection (TDI) turbodiesel; 3,328 cc (203.1 cu in); bore x stroke: 78.3 mm × 86.4 mm (3.08 in × 3.40 in), stroke ratio: 0.91:1 – undersquare/long-stroke, 416.0 cc per cylinder, compression ratio: 18.5:1, up to 160 bar (2,320 psi) cylinder pressure,
cylinder block & crankcase
compacted vermicular graphite cast iron (GJV/CGI); two-part cast aluminium alloy oil sump, five 86 mm (3.39 in) diameter main bearings, die–forged steel crossplane crankshaft with shared crankpins, diagonally split connecting rods, simplex roller chain-driven oil pump, pistons oil-cooled by cast-in cooling ducts
cylinder heads & valvetrain
cast aluminium alloy; four valves per cylinder, 32 valves total, sliding-finger cam followers with automatic hydraulic valve clearance compensation, 2x hybrid-driven double overhead camshafts (2xDOHC – two overhead camshafts per cylinder bank – 'quad cam', inlet camshafts are driven from a front-sited timing belt from the crankshaft, exhaust camshafts are gear-driven at the rear from the inlet camshafts)
aspiration
twin-turbo: two electronically controlled turbochargers with variable turbine geometry (VTG) (one turbo per cylinder bank), 2.2 bar (31.9 psi) maximum absolute pressure, combined 4-part inlet manifold and air-to-water intercooler mounted within the vee. With additional side-mounted coolant radiator and additional electric coolant pump
fuel system & engine management
(Common rail system) Low-pressure fuel lift pump mounted underneath the car turns on only when starter is being operated (when cranking); after that an electromagnetic valve bypass the pump. It uses a gear-type lift pump mounted on the passenger-side cylinder head driven by the camshaft; it is used to supply the high-pressure pump with sufficient pressure. Bosch CP3 high-pressure pump is used driven by the timing belt. Max rail pressure is 1350bar. Watercooled return line fuel cooler with an additional cooling pump (runs all the time) and side-mounted radiator and air-cooled return line cooler mounted on the bottom of the car. six-hole solenoid injection nozzles, CR electronic injection control. Dual Bosch EDC15 engine management computers running in master/slave configuration.
exhaust system
vacuum-operated water-cooled exhaust gas recirculation, two catalysts, European EU3 emissions standard compliant
dimensions
length: 717 mm (28.2 in), width: 842 mm (33.1 in), height: 688 mm (27.1 in)
DIN-rated power & torque output
165 kW (224 PS; 221 bhp) at 4,000 rpm; 480 N⋅m (354 lbf⋅ft) at 1,800–3,000 rpm
best specific consumption
205 g/kWh (41.1% energy efficiency)
application
Audi D2 A8 quattro (12/99-09/02)
reference
"Audi A8 3.3 TDI quattro: top TDI for the luxury class". AudiWorld.com. AUDI AG – press release. 10 July 2000.
"Compacted Graphite Iron for diesel engine cylinder blocks" (PDF). Tupy.com.br. Tupy Fundições. May 2004. p. 9.

=== 4.0 (Technically – 3.9 L) V8 32v TDI CR 202kW ===
When introduced in May 2003, this 3.9-litre V8 was the highest power and highest torque diesel V8 fitted in any production car worldwide. This was the second 'new' V engine from Audi which utilises new technologies – including chain-driven overhead camshafts and ancillary units, following the 4.2 40-valve V8 petrol engine first seen in the B6 S4. This engine was discontinued in July 2005, superseded by the bored-out and updated but fundamentally identical 4.2 V8 TDI.

identification
parts code prefix: 057.B, ID code: ASE
engine configuration & engine displacement
90° V8 engine, Turbocharged Direct Injection (TDI) turbodiesel; 3,937 cc (240.3 cu in), bore x stroke: 81.0 mm × 95.5 mm (3.19 in × 3.76 in), stroke ratio: 0.85:1 – undersquare/long-stroke, 492.1 cc per cylinder, 88 mm (3.46 in) cylinder spacing, compression ratio: 17.5:1, water-cooled alternator
cylinder block & crankcase
compacted vermicular graphite cast iron (GJV/CGI); cast reinforcing bed-plate lower frame incorporating five main bearings with each bearing affixed by four bolts, three-part oil sump consisting of cast alloy upper section, a middle baffle section and pressed steel lower section, die–forged steel crossplane crankshaft with shared crankpins, diagonally fracture-split connecting rods, chain-driven ancillaries, oil filter module (incorporating oil separator and water-to-oil cooler) mounted within the 'vee'
cylinder heads & valvetrain
cast aluminium alloy; four valves per cylinder, 32 valves total, operated by low-friction roller finger cam followers with automatic hydraulic valve clearance compensation, 2x double overhead camshafts (2xDOHC – two overhead camshafts per cylinder bank – 'quad cam') – the inlets driven in a relay method at the rear (flywheel) end of the engine by four simplex roller chains and the exhausts driven from the inlets by automatic slack adjusting spur gears at the front end, two unequal-length swirl-inducing switchable inlet ports, siamesed unequal-length exhaust ports
aspiration
two air filters, two hot-film air mass meters, 'biturbo': two water-cooled Garrett GT1749 turbochargers with electrically actuated Variable Turbine Geometry (VTG) (one turbo per cylinder bank) operating up to 210,000 rpm with a maximum boost of 2.2 bar (32 psi), two air-to-air fan-assisted side-mounted intercoolers (SMICs), two separate cast alloy intake manifolds interconnected by a "feedthrough" system to equalise the turbo boost pressure in the two cylinder banks, two-position variable swirl flaps integrated into the intake tract
fuel system & engine management
electric low-pressure fuel lift pump, one toothed belt driven 1,600 bar (23,210 psi) injection pump, one central fuel distributor supplying two common rail (CR) fuel rails (one per cylinder bank), Bosch solenoid-valve injectors with seven-hole nozzles for homogenous fuel delivery, single and double pilot injection; Bosch EDC16 electronic engine control unit (ECU)
exhaust system
twin water-cooled exhaust gas recirculation (mounted within the 'vee'), air-gap insulated fan-branch alloy steel exhaust manifolds, two close-coupled primary catalytic converters plus two main underfloor converters, Euro3 emissions standard
dimensions
length: 516 mm (20.3 in), mass: 270 kg (595 lb)
DIN-rated power & torque output
202 kW (275 PS; 271 bhp); 650 N⋅m (479 lbf⋅ft) at 1,800–2,500 rpm
application
Audi D3 A8 4.0 TDI quattro (05/03-07/05)
reference
"Audi A8 4.0 TDI quattro". AudiWorld.com. AUDI AG – press release. 4 March 2003.
"Audi A8 4.0 TDI quattro – in detail". WorldCarFans.com. AUDI AG – press release. 12 May 2003.

== Ten-cylinder diesels ==
=== 4.9/5.0 V10 TDI PD 230-258kW ===
This '4.9' or '5.0' badged V10 TDI diesel engine is only used in Volkswagen Passenger Cars 'premium' models. At its launch in the Volkswagen Phaeton, it became the most powerful diesel-engined car in the world. A heavily modified dry sump version was used in an LMP1 Lola sports car to compete in the 2004 Le Mans under a Caterpillar badge. "24 Heures du Mans". Perkins.com. Perkins Engines Co. Ltd. 16 March 2006.

identification
parts code prefix: 07Z
engine configuration & engine displacement
90° V10 engine, Turbocharged Direct Injection (TDI) turbodiesel; 4,921 cc (300.3 cu in), bore x stroke: 81.0 mm × 95.5 mm (3.19 in × 3.76 in), stroke ratio: 0.85:1 – undersquare/long-stroke, 492.1 cc per cylinder, 88 mm (3.46 in) cylinder spacing, compression ratio: 18.0:1, water-cooled alternator
cylinder block & crankcase
low-pressure die-cast aluminium alloy (AlSi8Cu3); bolted-on grey cast iron bearing tunnel and crank carrier with six main bearings, die-forged steel cross-plane crankshaft with 18-degree crankpin offset to achieve a 72-degree even firing order, contra-rotating balance shaft, diagonally cracked forged connecting rods, two-part cast aluminium alloy baffled oil sump
cylinder heads & valvetrain
cast aluminium alloy; two valves per cylinder, 20 valves total, each with two concentric valve springs and bucket tappets, gear-driven single overhead camshaft utilising a separate cassette-type 'motor control module'
aspiration
two air filters with two hot-film air mass meters, twin-turbo: two electrically controlled Garrett GT1852V variable vane turbochargers, two side-mounted intercoolers, two cast alloy intake manifolds
fuel system & engine management
Pumpe Düse (PD) diesel direct injection: one underfloor electric fuel lift pump, two camshaft-driven low-pressure fuel pumps supplying common fuel rails (one per cylinder bank), ten camshaft-actuated UI-P1 2,050 bar (29,730 psi) Unit Injectors with solenoid-actuated nozzles, 72° injection interval; two Bosch EDC16 32-bit electronic engine control units (ECUs) working on the 'master/slave' method
exhaust system
water-cooled exhaust gas recirculation (EGR), air-gap insulated cast iron exhaust manifolds, two close-coupled ceramic catalytic converters, two main underfloor oxidising catalytic converters, EU3 emissions compliant
dimensions
length: 544 mm (21.4 in)
4.9 DIN-rated power & torque output, ID codes
230 kW (313 PS; 308 bhp) at 3,750 rpm; 750 N⋅m (553 lbf⋅ft) at 2,000 rpm — AJS, BLE, BKW (North America)
5.0 DIN-rated power & torque outputs, ID codes
230 kW (313 PS; 308 bhp) at 3,750 rpm; 750 N⋅m (553 lbf⋅ft) at 2,000 rpm — AYH, BWF
258 kW (351 PS; 346 bhp) at 3,500 rpm; 850 N⋅m (627 lbf⋅ft) at 2,000 rpm — CBWA: Touareg R50
4.9 applications
Volkswagen Phaeton 4motion (AJS: 12/02-10/06), Volkswagen Touareg (BKW: 11/03-11/04, BLE: 11/04->)
5.0 application
Volkswagen Touareg (AYH: 11/02-11/06, BWF: 12/06-02/09), Touareg R50 (CBWA: 08/07->)
references
"Volkswagen Touareg – in depth". WorldCarFans.com. 7 October 2002.
"Volkswagen Phaeton V10 TDI in detail – The ten-cylinder diesel engine". WorldCarFans.com. 24 March 2003.
"Volkswagen Touareg R50 – in depth". WorldCarFans.com. Volkswagen Group – press release. 9 October 2007.

==== awards ====
Was the winner of the "Above 4.0-litre" category for two consecutive years in the 2003 and 2004 annual competition for International Engine of the Year "VW V10 TDI wins International Engine of the Year Award". WorldCarFans.com. VW UK – press release. 27 May 2004.

== See also ==
- list of Volkswagen Group petrol engines (current)
- list of Volkswagen Group diesel engines (current)
- list of discontinued Volkswagen Group petrol engines
- list of North American Volkswagen engines
- Turbocharged Direct Injection (TDI)
- Suction Diesel Injection (SDI)
- G-Lader
- G60 – for detailed development info and progression of forced induction in Volkswagen Group engines
- BlueMotion
- list of Volkswagen Group platforms
- list of Volkswagen Group factories
