= SEAT Exeo =

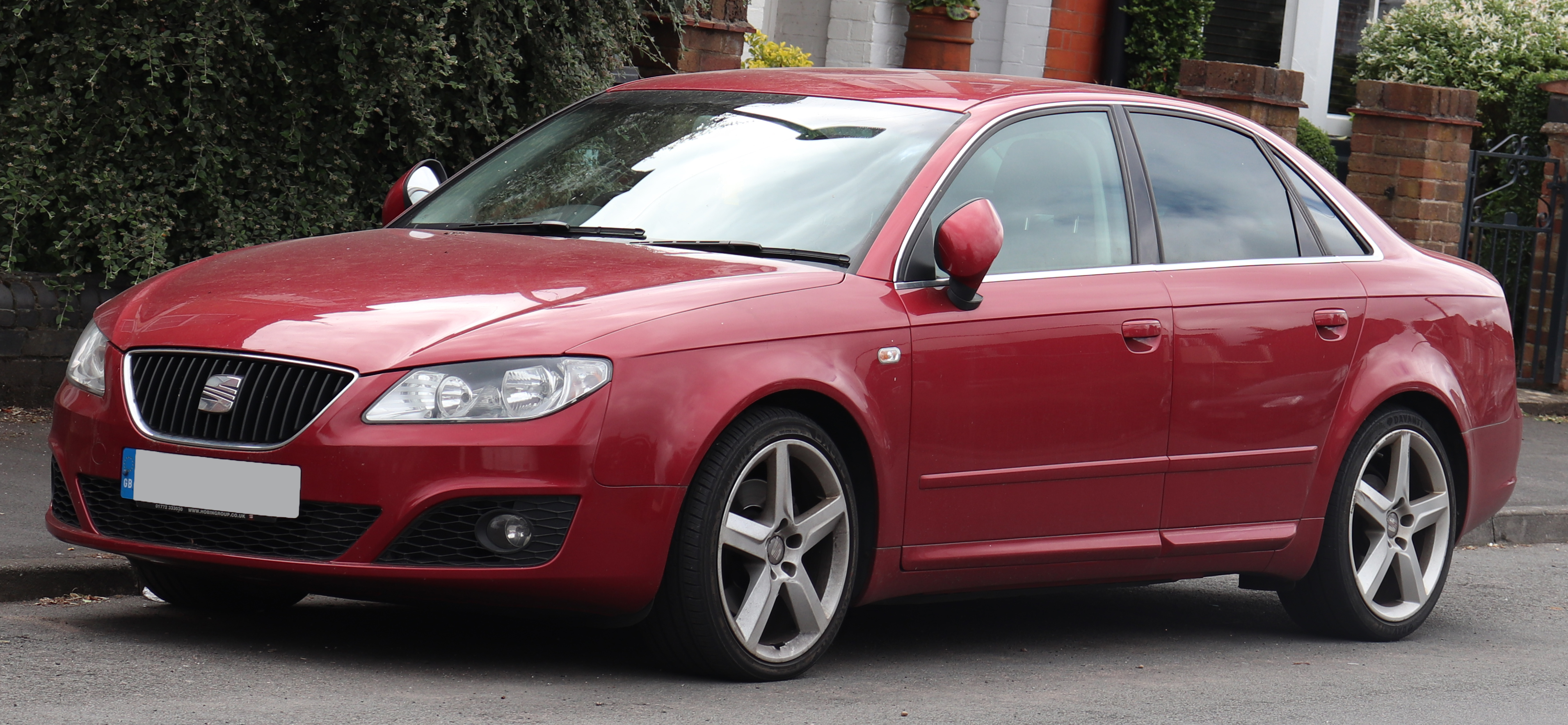

Overview
- Manufacturer: SEAT
- Production: 2008–2014
- Assembly: Spain: Martorell, Catalonia

Body and chassis
- Class: Large family car (D)
- Body style: 4-door saloon 5-door estate
- Layout: Longitudinally mounted front-engine, front-wheel-drive
- Platform: Volkswagen Group B7
- Related: Audi A4 (B7)

Powertrain
- Engine: Petrol: 1.6 L I4; 1.8 L I4 16v TSI; 1.8 L I4 20v Turbo; 1.8 L I4 16v TSI; 2.0 L I4 16v TSI; Diesel: 2.0 L I4 16v TDI CR
- Transmission: 6-speed manual 6/7-speed LuK multitronic CVT

Dimensions
- Wheelbase: 2,642 mm (104.0 in)
- Length: 4,661 mm (183.5 in) (saloon); 4,666 mm (183.7 in) (estate)
- Width: 1,772 mm (69.8 in)
- Height: 1,430 mm (56.3 in) (saloon); 1,454 mm (57.2 in) (estate)
- Kerb weight: 1,310–1,455 kg (2,888–3,208 lb)

Chronology
- Predecessor: SEAT 132; SEAT Bolero (concept)

The SEAT Exeo (Spanish: [eɣˈseo]) is a large family car and flagship model, that was built by the Spanish car manufacturer SEAT, subsidiary of the Volkswagen Group. The Exeo is an rebadged Audi A4 (B7) with a redesigned front and rear.

Previously codenamed Bolero (though not to be confused with SEAT's earlier concept car bearing the same name) and internally designated Typ 3R, the name Exeo derives from the Latin word exire, meaning "to go beyond", breaking SEAT's recent tradition to name its cars after Spanish cities.

This car was made available in four-door saloon or five-door estate styles only. Production of the Exeo ended in May 2014, with the final production number being 81,572. There was no direct replacement.

== Overview ==
The Exeo is a D-segment model, built on the Volkswagen Group B7 (PL46) platform. It is essentially a rebadged Audi A4 B7 generation, with styling changes to the front and rear by way of unique bonnet, front wings, boot lid, doors and exterior door mirrors.

It incorporates interior trim from the A4 Cabriolet, and extensively uses A4 B6 and B7 interior equipment and electrical components. To this purpose, the entire Audi A4 B7 production and assembly lines from Ingolstadt were dismantled and installed in Volkswagen Group's related SEAT factory in Martorell, Spain.

The Exeo was officially revealed at the 2008 Paris Motor Show, and at launch, it was confirmed to be available in just one car body style, as a four-door, five-seater saloon (Typ 3R5). However, from August 2009, it also became available as a five-door, five-seater estate, called Exeo ST (Typ 3R9). ST is an abbreviation for Sport Tourer.

It became available for purchase in Western Europe in March 2009, with a model lineup which initially included three petrol engines and two diesel engines, with a third lower-powered 88 kilowatts (120 PS; 118 bhp) diesel engine being added from September 2009.

In May 2010, three new petrol engines entered production, these were the 1.8 TFSI 88 kilowatts (120 PS; 118 bhp), the 1.8 TFSI 118 kilowatts (160 PS; 158 bhp) and the 2.0 TFSI 155 kilowatts (211 PS; 208 bhp). It was available with three different trim levels: Reference, Stylance and Sport.

In 2011, the Exeo got a minor facelift with new bi-xenon LED headlights, revised engines and a new honeycomb grille.

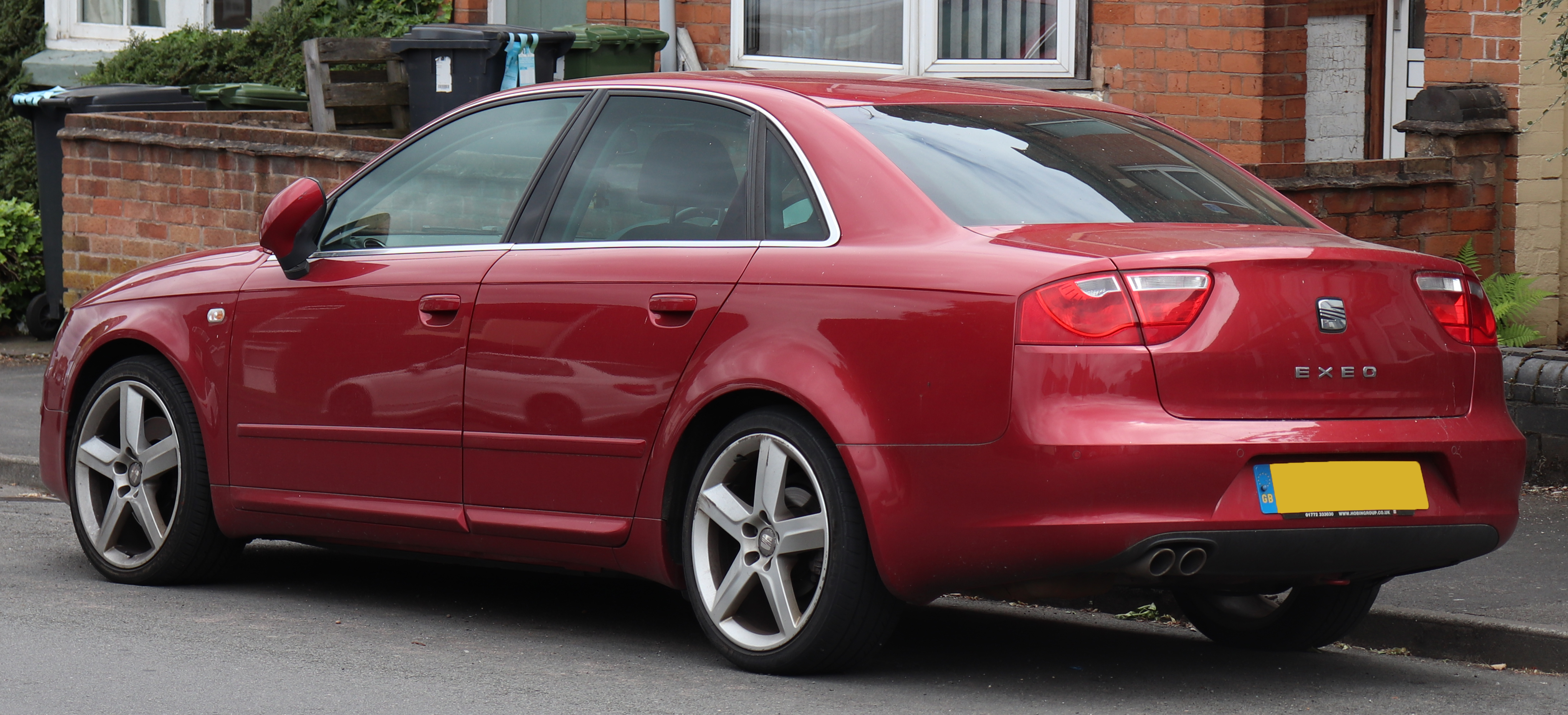
Sedan (pre-facelift)

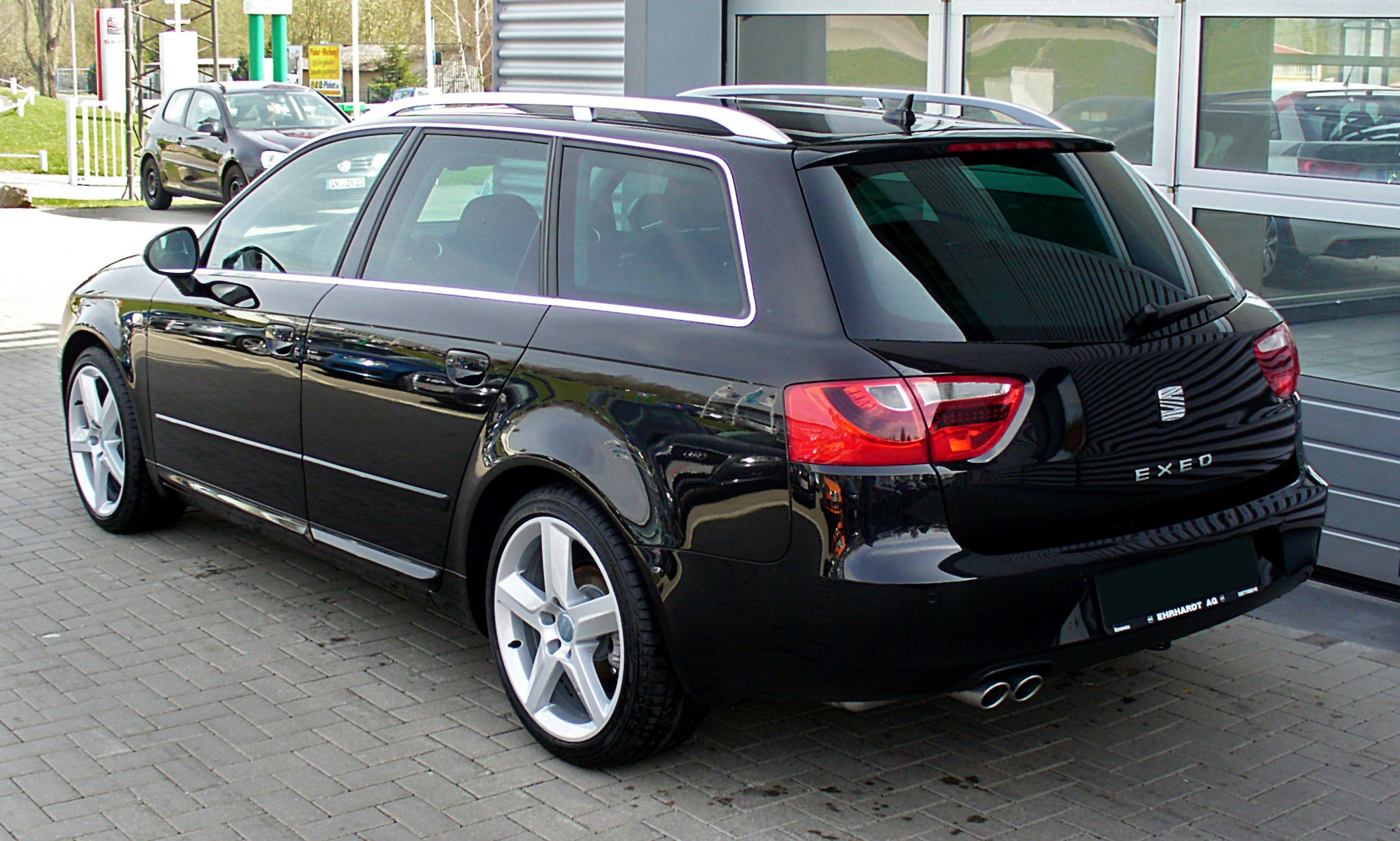
ST (pre-facelift)

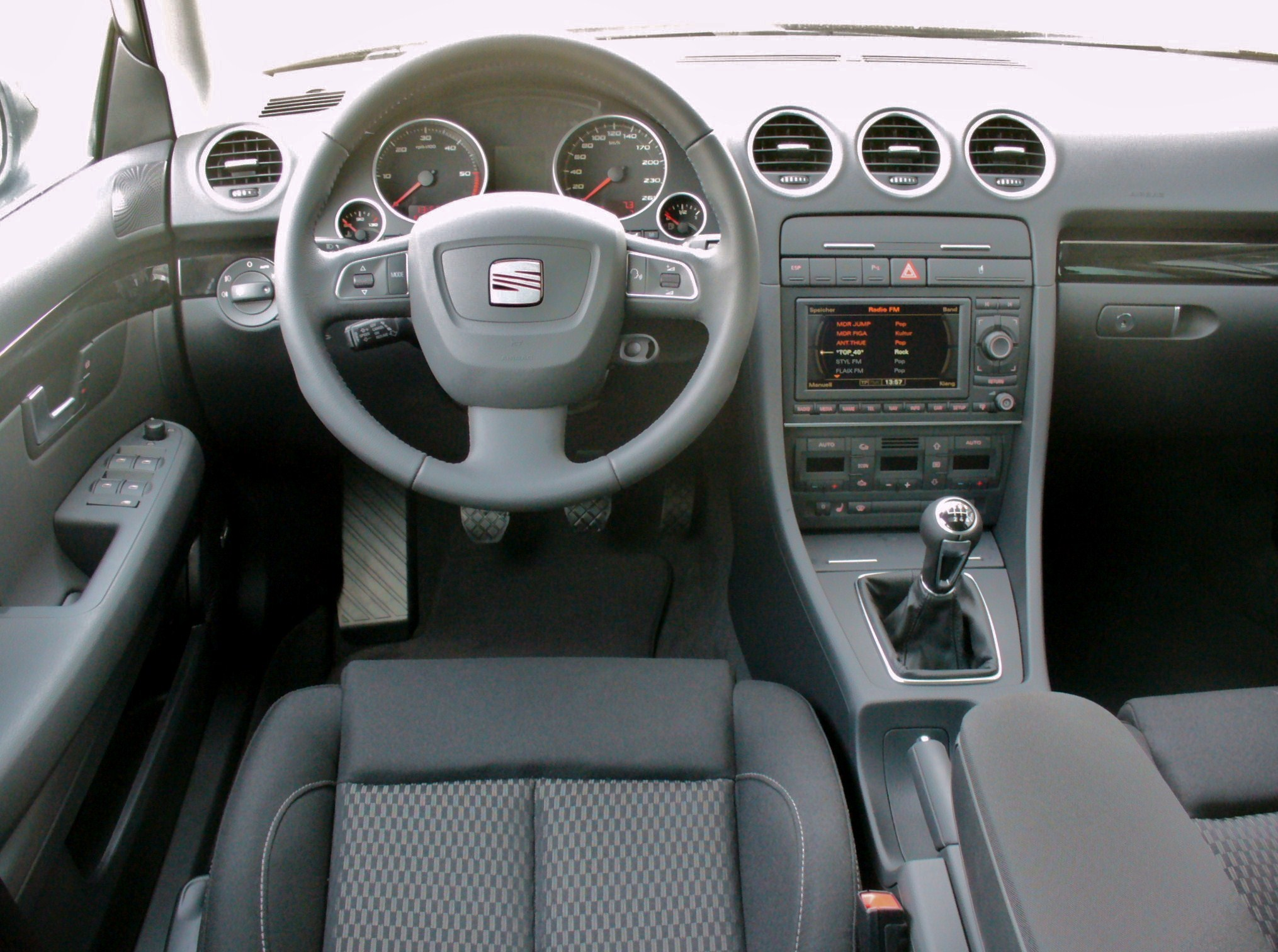
Interior (pre-facelift)

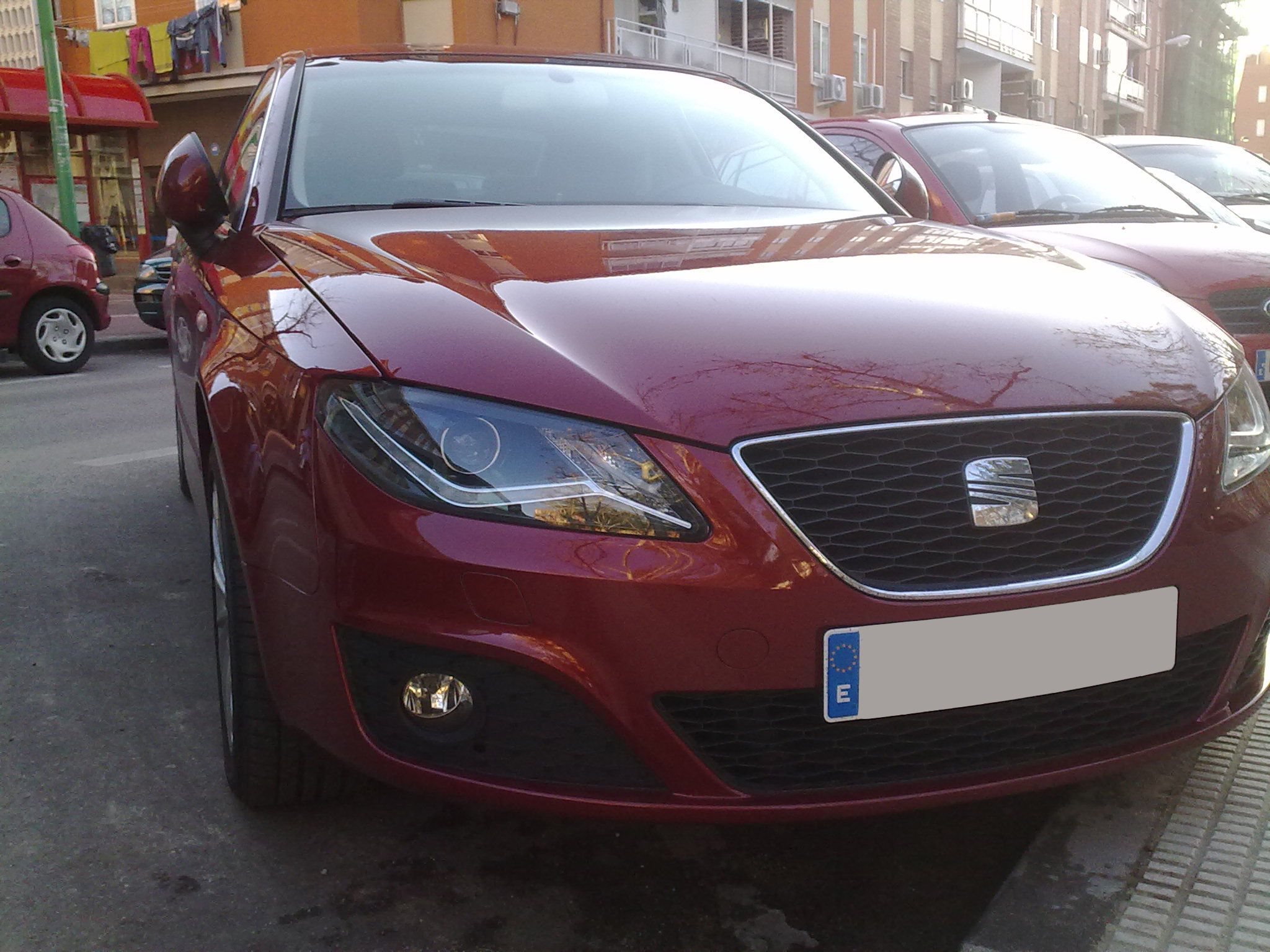
Front (facelift)

== Awards ==
- Golden Steering Wheel Award 2009 in Switzerland, in the upper medium sedan category
- Company Car 2009 in Germany, for the SEAT Exeo ST
- Car of the Year 2010 in Finland, by the Finnish magazine Tuulilasi
- Novelty of the Year 2009 in Catalonia

== Powertrain ==
The Exeo being derived from the Audi B7 A4, it shares the same fundamental powertrain layout. It has engines mounted at the front, and they are oriented longitudinally, i.e.: "north south", rather than the "east west" transverse engine layout used in the remainder of the SEAT range. The gearboxes are of a transaxle type (containing the gearbox, along with the front final drive and differential), and are also mounted longitudinally at the rear of the engine.

For the 1.8-litre 20 valve Turbo petrol engine, one side-mounted intercooler (SMIC) is fitted to the lower front left of the car, below the left headlamp. For the 2.0 TSI petrol, along with the 147 and 155 kilowatts (200 and 211 PS; 197 and 208 bhp) 2.0-litre Turbocharged Direct Injection diesel engines, these use two SMICs, one below the left and right headlamps.

All diesel engine variants are common rail (CR) Turbocharged Direct Injection (TDI) engines and includes an exhaust catalytic converter along with a diesel particulate filter (DPF).

Transmission options initially included only a six-speed manual gearbox. Shortly after launch, the LuK originated multitronic continuously variable transmission (CVT), with selectable six or seven speeds, became available on models equipped with the 2.0 TSI petrol and 2.0 TDI diesel engines. Distribution of the engine torque to the driven roadwheels is only via the front wheels, and there is not a four-wheel-drive offering, which the Audi A4 used as an option in its 'trademark' quattro.

=== Engine specifications ===
All available internal combustion engines are inline four cylinder four stroke designs and are based on existing units capable to be fitted longitudinally in the Exeo's PL46 platform and have also been used in other marques of the Volkswagen Group. They all comply with the European Euro 5 emissions standard, and offer the following performance statistics (for the saloon version in standard configuration):

Engine designation	Displacement, valvetrain, fuel system	ID code	Max. motive power at rpm	Max. torque at rpm	0–100 km/h (0–62 mph)	Top speed	CO_{2} (g/100 km)	Production dates	Trim level (saloon)		
Engine designation	Displacement, valvetrain, fuel system	ID code	Max. motive power at rpm	Max. torque at rpm	0–100 km/h (0–62 mph)	Top speed	CO_{2} (g/100 km)	Production dates	Reference	Stylance	Sport
Petrol engines
1.6 SRE	1595 cc, 8v SOHC multi-point fuel injection	ALZ (EA113)	75 kW (102 PS; 101 bhp) at 5,600 rpm	148 N⋅m (109 lbf⋅ft) at 3,800 rpm	12.6 sec.	190 km/h (118.1 mph)	179	03/2009– 2013	✓	✓	✗
1.8 SRE T	1781 cc, 20v DOHC; Turbocharged multi-point fuel injection	CFMA (EA113)	110 kW (150 PS; 148 bhp) at 5,700 rpm	220 N⋅m (162 lbf⋅ft) at 1,800 rpm	9.3 sec.	217 km/h (134.8 mph)	184	12/2008– 05/2010	✓	✓	✓
1.8 TSI	1798 cc, 16v DOHC; Turbocharged Fuel Stratified Injection	CDH (EA888)	88 kW (120 PS; 118 bhp) at 4,000–6,200 rpm	230 N⋅m (170 lbf⋅ft) at 1,500–3,650 rpm	10.7 sec.	202 km/h (125.5 mph)	166	09/2010– 2013	✓	✓	✗
1.8 TSI	1798 cc, 16v DOHC; Turbocharged Fuel Stratified Injection	CDH (EA888)	118 kW (160 PS; 158 bhp) at 4,500-6,200 rpm	250 N⋅m (184 lbf⋅ft) at 1,500–4,500 rpm	8.6 sec.	225 km/h (139.8 mph)	166	05/2010– 2013	✓	✓	✓
2.0 TSI	1984 cc, 16v DOHC; Turbocharged Fuel Stratified Injection	BWE (EA113)	147 kW (200 PS; 197 bhp) at 6,000 rpm	280 N⋅m (207 lbf⋅ft) at 1,800–5,000 rpm	7.3 sec.	241 km/h (149.8 mph)	179	03/2009– 2013	✗	✓	✓
2.0 TSI	1984 cc, 16v DOHC; Turbocharged Fuel Stratified Injection	CDN (EA888)	155 kW (211 PS; 208 bhp) at 4,300-6,000 rpm	320 N⋅m (236 lbf⋅ft) at 1,500–4,600 rpm	7.1 sec.	244 km/h (151.6 mph)	159	05/2010– 2013	✗	✓	✓
Diesel engines
2.0 TDI CR + DPF	1968 cc, 16v DOHC common rail	CAGC (EA189)	88 kW (120 PS; 118 bhp) at 4,000 rpm	290 N⋅m (214 lbf⋅ft) at 1,750–2,500 rpm	10.5 sec.	204 km/h (126.8 mph)	139	09/2009– 2013	✓	✓	✗
2.0 TDI CR + DPF	1968 cc, 16v DOHC common rail	CAGA (EA189)	105 kW (143 PS; 141 bhp) at 4,200 rpm	320 N⋅m (236 lbf⋅ft) at 1,750–2,500 rpm	9.2 sec.	214 km/h (133.0 mph)	143	12/2008– 2013	✓	✓	✓
2.0 TDI CR + DPF	1968 cc, 16v DOHC common rail	CAHA (EA189)	125 kW (170 PS; 168 bhp) at 4,200 rpm	350 N⋅m (258 lbf⋅ft) at 1,750–2,500 rpm	8.4 sec.	229 km/h (142.3 mph)	153	02/2009– 2013	✗	✓	✓

== Other features ==
The Exeo also features the same multi link fully independent front and rear suspension as used on the Audi A4, again with light weight cast aluminium alloy front suspension arms and virtual steering axis uprights. All models are equipped with ZF-supplied power steering, with some models having speed sensitive 'servotronic' variable assistance.

Disc brakes are fitted front and rear, with the radially ventilated fronts ranging in diameter from 280 millimetres (11.0 in) by 22 millimetres (0.87 in) thick, to 320 millimetres (12.6 in) by 30 millimetres (1.18 in). At the rear are solid (un ventilated) discs ranging from 245 millimetres (9.6 in) by 10 millimetres (0.39 in) to 288 millimetres (11.3 in) by 12 millimetres (0.47 in). All discs, front and rear, use a single piston sliding brake caliper.

Chassis electronics feature as standard the Bosch ESP 8.0 Electronic Stability Programme, which also includes Anti lock Braking System (ABS), Electronic Brakeforce Distribution (EBD), and emergency Brake Assist (BA). This ESP system also includes Anti Slip Regulation (ASR, or traction control), and Electronic Differential Lock (EDL) traction aids.

Roadwheel options vary from a basic 7Jx16 steel wheel with plastic wheel covers, to a number of variants of alloy wheels, from 16" to 18" in diameter. Conventional halogen dual bulb (H7 dip and H1 main) headlamps are standard, with self leveling single source Bi Xenon high-intensity discharge (HID) headlights available as an option.

Luggage capacity in the saloon variant, measured according to the VDA 'block' method, is 460 litres (16.2 cu ft). On the other hand, in the estate Exeo ST variant, the boot size starts from 442 litres (15.6 cu ft) (or 564 litres (19.9 cu ft) when loaded up to roof) and after folding rear seats it rises to 882 litres (31.1 cu ft) (or 1,354 litres (47.8 cu ft) when loaded up to roof with rear seats down).

== Sales ==
In the year of 2009, the total annual retail sales number of SEAT Exeo cars was 21,013 vehicles (12,837 units for the Exeo and 8,176 for the Exeo ST version), while the annual production came up to 22,981 cars made in SEAT's plant in Martorell.

The total production per year of SEAT Exeo and Exeo ST cars is shown below:

Model	2008	2009	2010	2011	2012
SEAT Exeo	348	13,952			
SEAT Exeo ST	21	9,029			
Total annual production	369	22,981	23,108	19,559	10,854

== See also ==
- Audi A4
