= SDI (engine) =

Type of diesel engine

The SDI engine is a design of naturally aspirated (NA) direct injection diesel engine developed and produced by Volkswagen Group for use in cars and vans, along with marine engine (Volkswagen Marine) and Volkswagen Industrial Motor applications.

The SDI brand name (derived from "Suction Diesel Injection" or "Suction Diesel Direct Injection", the latter a literal translation of the German: Saugdiesel-Direkteinspritzung) was adopted in order to differentiate between earlier and less efficient indirect injection engines, called SD or "Suction Diesel", which were also produced by Volkswagen Group.

SDI engines are only produced in inline or straight engine configurations; and as they originate from a German manufacturer, are designated as either R4 or R5, taken from the German: Reihenmotor. They are available in various displacements (from 1.7 to 2.5 litres), in inline-four (R4 or I4) and inline-five (R5 or I5), in various states of tune, depending on intended application.

The SDI engine is generally utilised in applications where reliability and fuel economy are of primary concern. These engines lack any type of forced induction, hence the use of 'suction' in the title, and their power output is lower than a turbocharged engine of similar displacement. For example, the 2.0 SDI engine fitted to the Volkswagen Golf Mk5 has a peak power output of 55 kilowatts (75 PS; 74 bhp); whereas the same engine in Turbocharged Direct Injection (TDI) form is rated at 103 kilowatts (140 PS; 138 bhp) or 125 kilowatts (170 PS; 168 bhp), depending on specifications.

== SDI engines and applications ==
SDI engines: specifications, performance and applications
model	designation or ID code(s)	engine displacement	peak power at rpm (Directive 80/1269/EEC)	max. torque at rpm	notable design features	notes & application(s)
automotive engines
1.7 SDI	AHB, AHG, AKU, AKW	1,716 cubic centimetres (104.7 cu in)	44 kW (60 PS; 59 bhp) @ 4,200	115 N⋅m (85 lbf⋅ft) @ 2,200	Bosch VP37 (German: VerteilerPumpe) electronic distributor injection pump	Volkswagen Lupo, SEAT Arosa, Volkswagen Polo (some markets), Volkswagen Caddy Typ 9K
1.9 SDI	ASY, AEY, AGD	1,896 cubic centimetres (115.7 cu in)	47 kW (64 PS; 63 bhp) @ 4,200	125 N⋅m (92 lbf⋅ft) @ 1,600-2,800	Bosch VP37 (VerteilerPumpe) electronic distributor injection pump	Volkswagen Polo Mk3, Volkswagen Polo Classic, Volkswagen Golf Mk3, Volkswagen Caddy Typ 9U/9K, SEAT Inca, Škoda Octavia (Mk1), Škoda Fabia, Volkswagen Bora (some markets), Volkswagen Jetta King, Volkswagen Jetta Pioneer
1.9 SDI	AGP, AQM	1,896 cubic centimetres (115.7 cu in)	50 kW (68 PS; 67 bhp) @ 4,000	133 N⋅m (98 lbf⋅ft) @ 1,800	Bosch VP37 (VerteilerPumpe) electronic distributor injection pump	Volkswagen Polo Mk3, Volkswagen Golf Mk4, Volkswagen Caddy Typ 9U/9K, SEAT Ibiza, SEAT Inca, SEAT León Mk1 (1M), Škoda Octavia (Mk1) Volkswagen Bora (some markets)
2.0 SDI PD	BDJ, BST	1,968 cubic centimetres (120.1 cu in)	51 kW (69 PS; 68 bhp) @ 4,200	140 N⋅m (103 lbf⋅ft) @ 2,200-2,400	Bosch Pumpe Düse technology	Volkswagen Caddy Typ 2K
2.0 SDI PD	BDK	1,968 cubic centimetres (120.1 cu in)	55 kW (75 PS; 74 bhp) @ 4,200	140 N⋅m (103 lbf⋅ft) @ 2,200-2,400	Bosch Pumpe Düse technology	Volkswagen Golf Mk5
2.5 R5 SDI	AGX	2,461 cubic centimetres (150.2 cu in)	55 kW (75 PS; 74 bhp)	160 N⋅m (118 lbf⋅ft)	Inline-five engine, Bosch VP37 (VerteilerPumpe) electronic distributor injection pump	Volkswagen LT28 and LT35 vans (05/96-04/01)
marine engines
1.9 SDI	SDI 40–4, SDI 50–4, SDI 60-4	1,896 cubic centimetres (115.7 cu in)	29 kW (39 PS; 39 bhp) @ 2,600 / 37 kW (50 PS; 50 bhp) @ 3,000 / 44 kW (60 PS; 59 bhp) @ 3,600	126 N⋅m (93 lbf⋅ft) @ 2,000 / 130 N⋅m (96 lbf⋅ft) @ 2,000 / 129 N⋅m (95 lbf⋅ft) @ 2,000	Bosch VP37 (VerteilerPumpe) electronic distributor injection pump	Small motor cruisers. Optional connection for heater core or hot water preparation for use in sailboats
2.5 R5 SDI	SDI 55–5, SDI 75-5	2,461 cubic centimetres (150.2 cu in)	40 kW (54 PS; 54 bhp) @ 2,500 / 55 kW (75 PS; 74 bhp) @ 3,600	155 N⋅m (114 lbf⋅ft) @ 2,250	Inline-five engine, Bosch VP37 (VerteilerPumpe) electronic distributor injection pump	Yachts and motor cruisers
industrial engines (80/1269/EEC-rated)
1.9 SDI	430/BXT	1,896 cubic centimetres (115.7 cu in)	30 kW (41 PS; 40 bhp)		Bosch VP37 (VerteilerPumpe) electronic distributor injection pump	Volkswagen Industrial Motor
1.9 SDI	444	1,896 cubic centimetres (115.7 cu in)	44 kW (60 PS; 59 bhp) @ 3,600	130 N⋅m (96 lbf⋅ft) @ 2,200	Bosch VP37 (VerteilerPumpe) electronic distributor injection pump	Volkswagen Industrial Motor

Notes: Volkswagen Marine engines were originally rated according to Directive 80/1269/ EEC. However, some are now being rated to ISO 8178-4.

== Lubricants ==
Like their related Volkswagen Group Turbocharged Direct Injection diesel engines, Volkswagen AG requires that motor oil lubricants for SDI engines must conform to one of the officially approved standards VW505.00, 505.01, 506.00, 506.01, or 507.00. 'Generic' oil standards such as the American Petroleum Institute 'API', or European Automobile Manufacturers Association 'ACEA' are not in themselves recognised or approved by VW, although such an oil may also conform to one of the specific VW standards.

Many formulations of motor oils from most brands are now "VW Approved" to the above standards. However some unapproved 'off brands' print the VW number on the label, implying that they meet the said standard, but hide in small type the word "recommended". Only Volkswagen AG can grant the necessary approvals, following in-house testing. Volkswagen Germany (and Volkswagen of America) publish up-to-date lists of currently approved oils on their respective websites, along with the technical resource, erWin.

All SDI-engined models with "LongLife Servicing", "Extended Service Intervals", "ESI", or "WIV", must be lubricated by official 'LongLife' lubricants, namely VW506.00 (for non-PD), VW506.01 (for PD), or VW507.00. According to VW 'generic' longlife lubricants, or those certified by other manufacturers such as General Motors, BMW or Mercedes-Benz should not be used.

== SDI vs other VW Group diesel engines ==
The following table contains a selection of current and historical Volkswagen Group compression-ignition SDI diesel engines for comparison of performance and operating characteristics with other naturally aspirated and forced induction engines of the same capacity:

engine model	engine displacement	engine configuration & diesel fuel system	valvetrain	max. power: kW (PS)	rpm for max. power	max. torque: Nm (ft·lbf]	rpm for max. torque	specific power: kW/L (PS/L)	max MEP: bar	MEP @ max. power: bar	max operating revs: rpm	dates installed
1.4 SD	1,391 cc (84.9 cu in)	inline 4, indirect injection mechanical distributor injection pump	8v SOHC	35 (48)	4,500	82 (60)	2,700 – 3,500	25.2 (34.5)			5,000	Polo 2, 2F late 1980s - early 1990s
1.4 TDI	1,422 cc (86.8 cu in)	inline 3, turbo direct injection mechanically pressurised, electrically triggered pumpe-duse unit injectors	12v SOHC	59 (80)	4,000	195 (144)	2,200	41.5 (56.3)				Polo Bluemotion, first generation 2006 - 2010
1.7 D	1,716 cc (104.7 cu in)	inline 4, indirect injection mechanical distributor injection pump	8v SOHC	42 (57)	4,500	103 (76)	2,800	24.5 (33.2)				10/1986- 05/1992
1.7 SDI	1,716 cc (104.7 cu in)	inline 4, direct injection electronic distributor injection pump	8v SOHC	44 (60)	4,200	115 (85)	2,200	25.6 (35.0)				07/1996- 07/2005
1.9 D	1,896 cc (115.7 cu in)	inline 4, indirect injection mechanical distributor injection pump	8v SOHC	47 (64)	4,300	124 (91)	2,500- 3,200	24.8 (33.8)				
1.9 SD	1,896 cc (115.7 cu in)	inline 4, indirect injection electronic distributor injection pump	8v SOHC	36 (49)	3,000	121 (89)	1,800	19.0 (25.8)				current (Industrial)
1.9 SDI	1,896 cc (115.7 cu in)	inline 4, direct injection electronic distributor injection pump	8v SOHC	50 (68)	4,000	133 (98)	1,800	26.4 (35.9)				current
1.9 TD	1,896 cc (115.7 cu in)	inline 4, indirect injection mechanical distributor injection pump	8v SOHC	55 (75)	4,200	150 (111)	2,000	29.0 (39.6)				
1.9 TDI	1,896 cc (115.7 cu in)	inline 4, direct injection electronic distributor injection pump	8v SOHC	66 (90)	3,750	210 (155)	1,900	34.8 (47.5)				
1.9 TDI PD	1,896 cc (115.7 cu in)	inline 4, direct injection Pumpe Düse (PD) Unit Injector	8v SOHC	96 (131)	4,000	310 (229)	1,900	50.6 (69.1)				current
2.0 SDI PD	1,968 cc (120.1 cu in)	inline 4, direct injection Pumpe Düse (PD) Unit Injector	8v SOHC	55 (75)	4,200	140 (103)	2,400	27.9 (38.1)				current
2.0 TDI PD; 140 PS	1,968 cc (120.1 cu in)	inline 4, direct injection Pumpe Düse (PD) Unit Injector	8v SOHC	103 (140)	4,000	320 (236)	1,800	52.3 (71.1)	20.43	15.70		current
2.0 TDI PD 16v 170 PS	1,968 cc (120.1 cu in)	inline 4, direct injection Pumpe Düse (PD) Unit Injector	16v DOHC	125 (170)	4,200	350 (258)	1,800- 2,500	63.5 (86.4)				current
2.0 TDI CR 16v 170 PS	1,968 cc (120.1 cu in)	inline 4, direct injection common rail (CR)	16v DOHC	125 (170)	4,200	350 (258)	1,750- 2,500	63.5 (86.4)				current
2.5 R5 SDI; 75 PS	2,461 cc (150.2 cu in)	inline 5, direct injection electronic distributor injection pump	10v SOHC	55 (75)	3,600	155 (114)	2,250	22.3 (30.5)				02/2002- current
2.5 R5 TDI CR; 163 PS	2,461 cc (150.2 cu in)	inline 5, direct injection common rail (CR)	10v SOHC	120 (163)	3,500	350 (258)	2,000	48.8 (66.3)				current
2.5 R5 TDI PD; 174 PS	2,461 cc (150.2 cu in)	inline 5, direct injection Pumpe Düse (PD) Unit Injector	10v SOHC	128 (174)	3,500	400 (295)	2,000	52.0 (70.7)	20.43	17.84		current
engine model	engine displacement	engine configuration & diesel fuel system	valvetrain	max. power: kW (PS)	rpm for max. power	max. torque: Nm (ft·lbf)	rpm for max. torque	specific power: kW/L (PS/L)	max MEP: bar	MEP @ max. power: bar	max operating rpm	dates installed
