= List of Volkswagen Group engines =

This list of Volkswagen Group engines includes internal combustion engines and related technologies produced by the German automotive concern, Volkswagen Group.

== Lists of all engines ==
The following articles list Volkswagen Group engines which are available worldwide. These include motor vehicle engines, marine engines sold by Volkswagen Marine and industrial engines sold by Volkswagen Industrial Motor.

- List of Volkswagen Group petrol engines (current)
- List of Volkswagen Group diesel engines (current)
- List of discontinued Volkswagen Group petrol engines
- List of discontinued Volkswagen Group diesel engines

== Specific engines, engine series, regional engines ==
- Volkswagen air-cooled engine
- Volkswagen Wasserboxer engine
- Volkswagen EA211 engine
- Volkswagen EA827 engine
- Volkswagen D24 engine
- Volkswagen D24T engine
- Volkswagen D24TIC engine
- G60
- VR6 engine
- List of North American Volkswagen engines

== Technologies ==
Some of the technologies which are unique to Volkswagen Group include:

- G-Lader
- Turbocharged Direct Injection
- Suction Diesel Injection
- Pumpe Düse
- Digifant Engine Management system
- Fuel Stratified Injection
- BlueMotion
- Cylinder On Demand
