= BlueMotion =

Certain Volkswagen car models

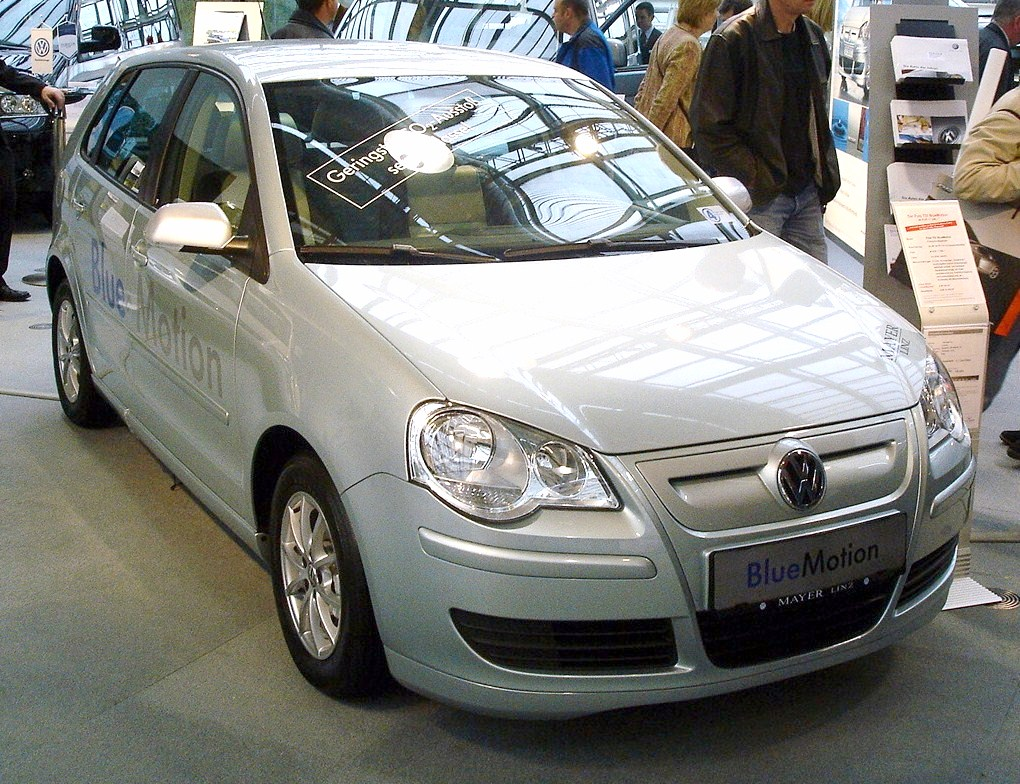
BlueMotion Volkswagen Polo with a more streamlined radiator grille

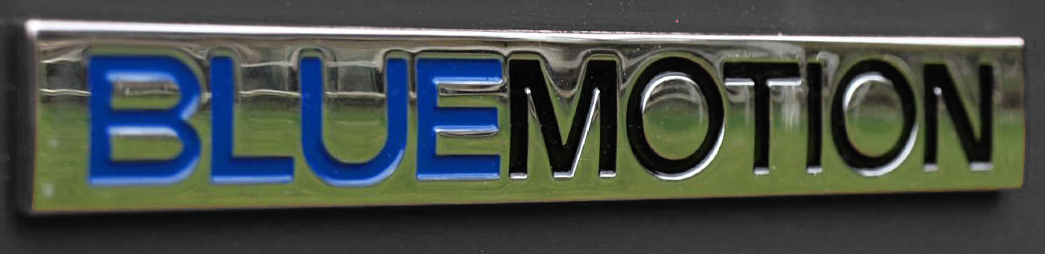
The BlueMotion Badge

BlueMotion is a trading name for certain car models from the Volkswagen Group, emphasizing higher fuel efficiency.

Volkswagen introduced the name in 2006 on the Polo Mk4 BlueMotion, and in 2007 a version based on the current Passat Mk6 was released. BlueMotion versions of the Golf Mk5 and Touran, as well as the Sharan, were released in 2008. It was also added to other models in 2009 including the Jetta Mk5, Caddy and Touareg, with others following afterwards. The name refers to Volkswagen Group's corporate color, blue, with the word 'motion' added to denote mobility, and echoes DaimlerChrysler's BlueTec engines with NNOx-reducing reducing technology for diesel-powered vehicle emissions control.

This technology has also been used in SEAT's models like the SEAT Ibiza or the SEAT León under the name 'EcoMotive', and in the Škoda Fabia and Superb, where the technology is called "GreenLine".

The BlueMotion Polo (Mk4) and Ibiza Ecomotive used a special 1.4 L three cylinder Turbocharged Direct Injection (TDI) diesel engine with 59 kW (80 PS; 79 bhp) power and an estimated fuel efficiency of 3.9 L/100 km (72 mpg_{‑imp}; 60 mpg_{‑US}), emitting 99 g/km of CO_{2} (base model), or 102 g/km with the trim package. The Ibiza was subsequently changed to the 1.2 L TDI engine. The BlueMotion Golf Mk6 uses a 1.6 L TDI engine, and Polo Mk5 uses a 1.2 L TDI engine, which produces 87 to 90 g/km of CO_{2}.

== Fuel economy ==
BlueMotion encompasses a variety of features, including a fuel-efficient engine, an aerodynamic body, a low ride height, an auto stop-start system, a programmed battery charging system, longer gearing, and low rolling resistance tires. On June 30, 2011, a Volkswagen Passat 1.6 TDI BlueMotion set a world record for the greatest distance driven on a single tank of fuel, which was recognized by the Guinness Book of Records. The vehicle achieved 1,526.63 miles (2,456.87 km). The average consumption amounted to 74.8 miles per US gallon (3.14 L/100 km; 89.8 mpg_{‑imp}).

== BlueMotion strategy ==
BlueMotion technologies include products and technologies to improve fuel economy and reduce emissions. Currently, they cover the TDI (turbocharged diesel direct injection) and TSI (boosted petrol stratified direct injection) engines and the Direct Shift Gearbox (DSG). They are supplemented by technologies like drive variants including EcoFuel (natural gas engines), BiFuel (liquid natural gas engines), MultiFuel (ethanol engines), hybrid systems and electric drives, as well as NOx emissions control, regenerative braking and the Stop-Start system. Products / vehicles, including these, are currently grouped under three Volkswagen brands: 'BlueMotion', 'BlueMotion Te technology', and 'BlueTDI'.

The BlueMotion brands represent the most fuel efficient models that Volkswagen offers of the following:

Engine
The engine has a number of modifications, including revised engine mapping, diesel particulate filters and oxidizing catalytic converters help lower fuel consumption and NOx levels. In the later models, there's also a start-stop system that halts and restarts the motor at brief stops.
Transmission
The last two gear ratios are longer than on standard TDI engine gearboxes.
Reduced rolling resistance
Low-resistance tires and better aerodynamics through lowered suspension, redesigned spoilers and additional enhancements underneath the car giving less drag which produces better fuel economy.

=== BlueMotion Technology ===
BlueMotion Technology packages can be configured with TSI and TDI engines. The package includes start-stop system, a change gear indicator, and regenerative braking technology. The 2015 Golf (mark VII) is available in a BlueMotion variant.

=== In Brazil ===
Currently BlueMotion in Brazil focuses on reduced rolling resistance and taller gearbox ratios, among other changes.

The Polo BlueMotion, the first model with the BlueMotion label in Brazil, uses the 1.6 TotalFlex (gasoline/alcohol) engine which is found in the other models. In April 2012 VW introduced the Fox BlueMotion with the same engine in Brazil.

=== Volkswagen Commercial Vehicles ===
Volkswagen Commercial Vehicles offers Multivan, Transporter and Crafter vehicles as either BlueMotion models or as BlueMotion Technology variants.

== See also ==
- Volkswagen emissions scandal
- Efficient Dynamics – BMW's equivalent branding
- BlueTec – Daimler's equivalent branding
- ECOnetic – Ford of Europe's similar branded low emissions range
