= Directive 80/1269/EEC =

Council Directive 80/1269/EEC of 16 December 1980 on the approximation of the laws of the Member States relating to the engine power of motor vehicles was a directive and law of the European Union concerning the measurement of engine power in motor vehicles. It applied to vehicles intended for road use with at least four wheels and a maximum speed exceeding 25 km/h. It was amended and replaced by Regulation (EC) No 595/2009 in 2013.

== Background ==
The directive aimed to harmonise the requirements of the Member States relating to the measurement of engine power for motor vehicles and to facilitate EEC type approval.

== See also ==
- Motor vehicle type approval
