= VR-5 =

VR5 or variations thereof may refer to:

- VR.5, American science-fiction television series
- VR5 engine, a family of petroleum fuelled Internal combustion engines
- VRC-30 (formerly VR-5), a United States Navy Fleet Logistics Support squadron
