= Volkswagen Bora =

Volkswagen Bora (A4)
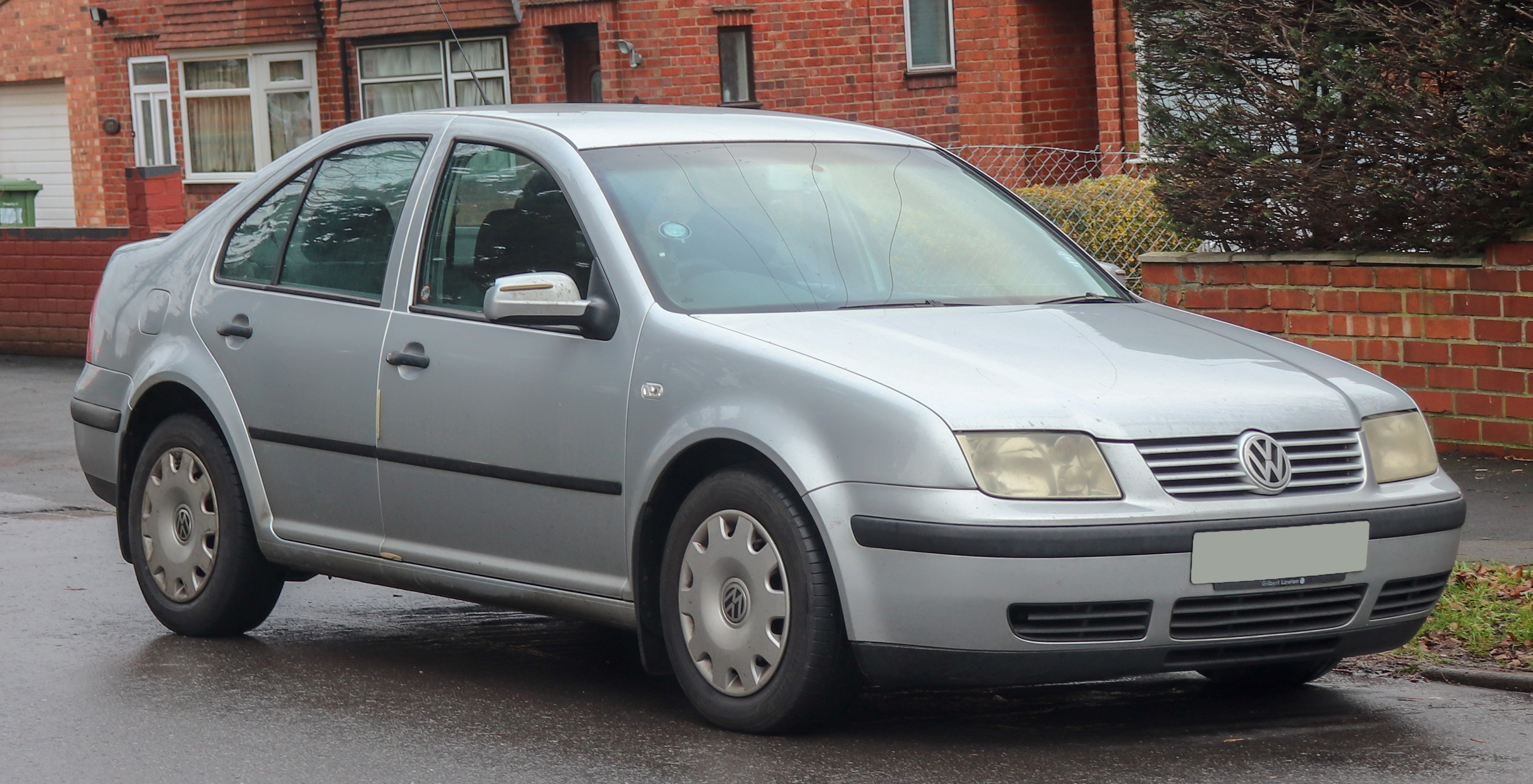
- 2003 Volkswagen Bora

Overview
- Manufacturer: Volkswagen
- Model code: 1J
- Also called: Volkswagen Jetta (North America and South Africa); Volkswagen Bora Classic (China, 2006–2008); Volkswagen City Jetta/Jetta City (Canada, 2007–2010); Volkswagen Clásico (Mexico, 2010–2015)
- Production: 1999–2006 (Europe); 1999–2015 (Mexico); 2001–2008 (China)
- Model years: 1999–2005 (US); 1999–2010 (Canada); 2000–2015 (Latin America)
- Assembly: Germany: Wolfsburg; Poland: Poznań; Slovakia: Bratislava; China: Changchun (FAW-VW); Mexico: Puebla; South Africa: Uitenhage
- Designer: Hartmut Warkuß; Freeman Thomas; J Mays

Body and chassis
- Body style: 4-door notchback sedan / saloon 5-door wagon / estate
- Layout: Front-engine, front-wheel-drive or four-wheel-drive
- Platform: Volkswagen Group A4 (PQ34) platform
- Related: Volkswagen Golf Mk4; Audi A3 Mk1; SEAT León Mk1; SEAT Toledo Mk2; Škoda Octavia Mk1

Powertrain
- Engine: 1.4 L I4 16V (petrol); 1.6 L SR I4 8V (petrol); 1.6 L I4 8V (petrol); 1.6 L I4 16-valve (petrol); 1.6 L FSi I4 (Petrol); 1.8 L I4 20-valve (petrol); 1.8 L I4 20-valve turbo (petrol); 2.0 L I4 (petrol); 2.3 L VR5 10-valve (petrol); 2.3 L VR5 20-valve (petrol); 2.8 L VR6 12-valve (petrol); 2.8 L VR6 24-valve (petrol); 1.9 L I4 SDI (diesel); 1.9 L I4 TDI (diesel)
- Transmission: 5-speed manual (02J); 6-speed manual (02M); 4-speed automatic (01M); 5-speed automatic Tiptronic (09A); 6-speed automatic (09G)

Dimensions
- Wheelbase: sedan: 2,510 mm (98.8 in) estate: 2,520 mm (99.2 in)
- Length: sedan: 4,380 mm (172.4 in) estate: 4,410 mm (173.6 in)
- Width: 1,730 mm (68.1 in)
- Height: sedan: 1,440 mm (56.7 in) estate: 1,490 mm (58.7 in) '08 City Jetta sedan: 1,445 mm (56.9 in)

Chronology
- Predecessor: Volkswagen Vento (A3); Volkswagen Citi Golf (China)
- Successor: Volkswagen Jetta (A5); Volkswagen Bora (second generation) (China)

The Volkswagen Bora is a small family car, the fourth generation of the Volkswagen Jetta, and the successor to the Volkswagen Vento. Volkswagen began production of the car in July 1999. Carrying on the wind nomenclature from previous generations, the car was known as the Bora in much of the world. Bora is a winter wind that blows intermittently over the coast of the Adriatic Sea, as well as in parts of Greece, Russia, Turkey, and the Sliven region of Bulgaria. In North America and South Africa, the Jetta moniker was kept once more due to the continued popularity of the car in those markets.

The Bora debuted shortly after its larger sibling, the fifth-generation Passat, with rear passenger doors differing from those of a five-door Golf. The car was also offered as an estate/wagon. Options included rain sensor-controlled windshield wipers and automatic climate control.

Two new internal-combustion engines were offered: the 1.8-litre turbo four-cylinder (often referred to as the 1.8 20vT), and the VR6. The suspension setup remained much as before, but was softened considerably in most models to give a comfortable ride. This was met with some criticism, as it was still quite hard in comparison to vehicles offered from French carmakers.

== Diesel ==
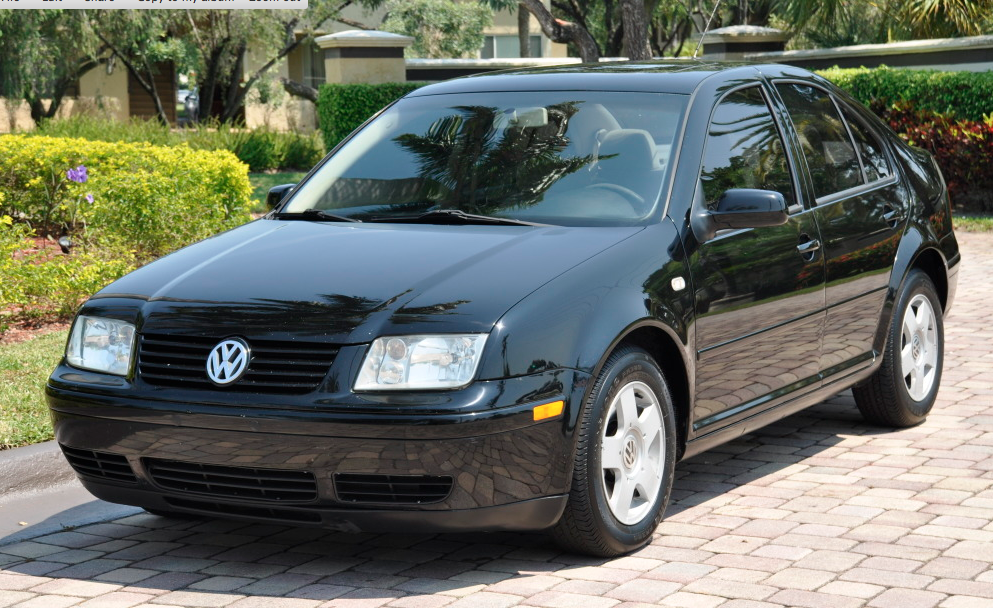
2002 Volkswagen Jetta TDI turbodiesel (US)

In 2004, a new range of Pumpe-Düse (PD) Unit Injector diesel engines were offered. The design employed unit injectors along with additional electronics and emissions equipment to meet emissions standards in Europe and North America, and is more complex than diesel engines previously offered. To accomplish the task of producing sufficient power while meeting emissions standards, the "PD" technology injects fuel directly into the combustion chamber at pressures up to 2,050 bar (30,000 psi). The purpose of the high pressure is to promote fine atomisation of the fuel, which supports more complete combustion. To reduce noise, the engine employs a "pilot injection" system that injects a small amount of fuel prior to the main injection. All of the new generation of diesel engines required a special motor oil to meet Volkswagen oil specification 505.01 (or newer), noting that serious damage to the engine, particularly the camshaft and injectors, will result if oil not meeting this standard is used.

== Safety ==
The car was manufactured using highly mechanised presses, improved measuring techniques, and laser welding of the roof. In crash tests, the fourth-generation car received very good marks. In the New Car Assessment Program tests conducted by the United States National Highway Traffic Safety Administration, the car received five out of five stars for both driver and passenger protection in a 56-km/h (35-mph) frontal impact. New side-impact tests at 62 km/h (38.5 mph) awarded the car four out of five stars for both driver and rear-seat passenger protection. Side-curtain airbags became standard in the 2001 model year. In the more severe 64-km/h (40-mph) offset test conducted by the US Insurance Institute for Highway Safety, the car was awarded the highest score of "Good". Injury, collision, and theft losses were low for a car of its class.

The Bora, in its most basic Latin American market configuration with two airbags, received three stars for adult occupants and three stars for toddlers from Latin NCAP 1.0 in 2012.

Latin NCAP 1.0 test results Volkswagen Clásico (Bora) + 2 Airbags (2012, based on Euro NCAP 1997)
Test	Points	Stars
Adult occupant:	10.27/17.0	3 /5 stars
Child occupant:	35.82/49.00	3 /5 stars

== Testing and review ==
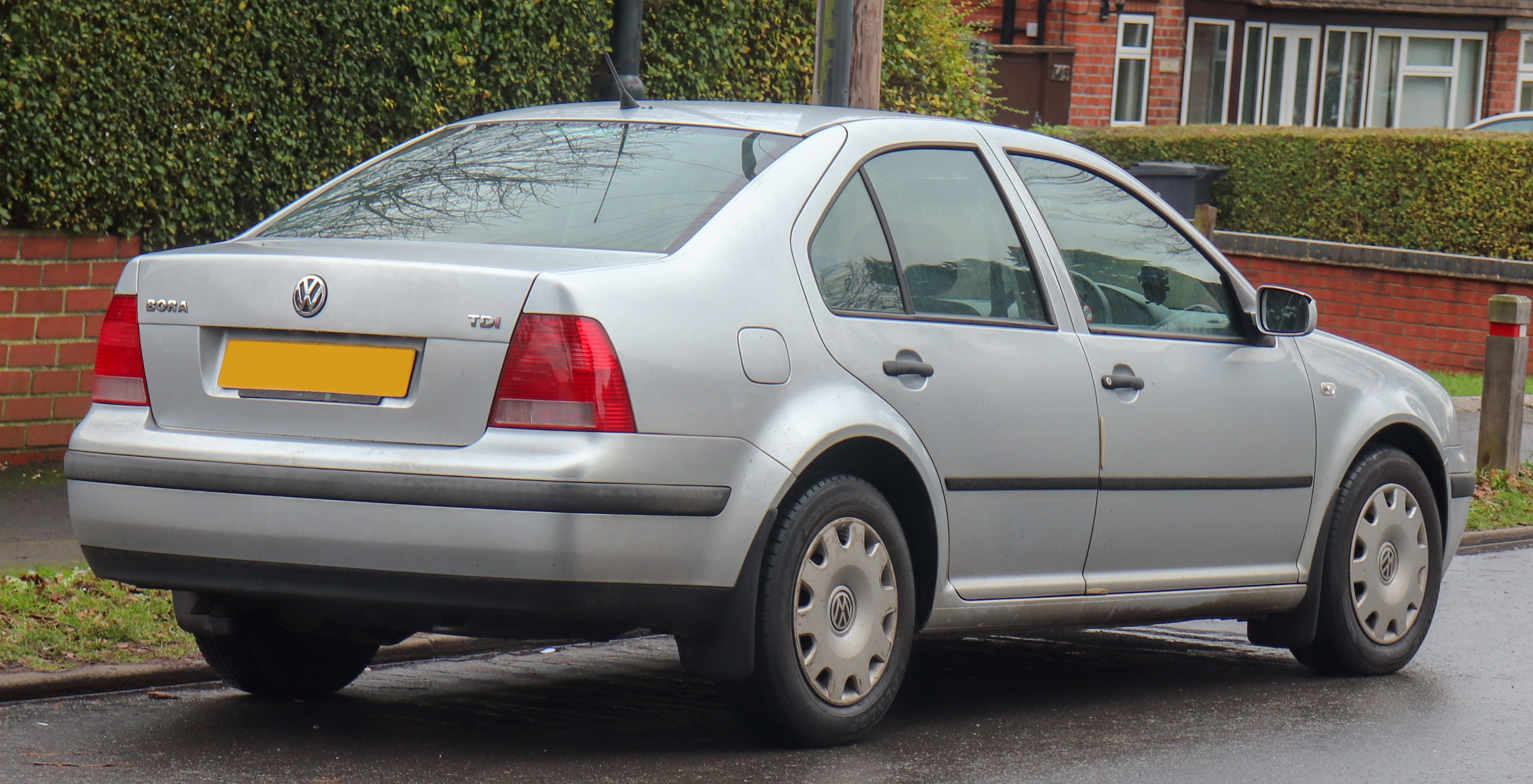
2003 Volkswagen Bora (rear view)

The Bora/Jetta A4 was praised for its adequate handling and a moderately comfortable ride. Other reviewers noted the car to be a somewhat expensive choice in the compact-car segment. Some complaints were made that the back seats lacked adequate room for two adults. Some found the seat cushioning too firm. The interior was praised for the high level of fit, but is sparsely equipped. New in this generation was Volkswagen's signature blue and red instrument lighting, which became standard in all models in 1999. The climate controls were placed low on the console. The recirculation mode cannot be turned on when air is vented to the windshield, and if the driver changes the climate control to vent air to the windshield, an internal mechanism would turn off the recirculation mode. The power outlet is recessed next to the ash tray and is covered with two flaps, one of which is shared with the ash tray. Retractable cup holders were placed directly above the stereo, obscuring vision of the stereo display and could allow beverages to spill on the stereo, gear selector, and other sensitive components during vehicle movement. Rear passengers have a pair of retractable cup holders located under the cylindrical ash tray on the center console. These problems were rectified for the US market in 2003 by placing two recessed cup holders in tandem in the center console and another behind the arm rest pedestal for rear passengers. The driver must raise the arm rest to access the center cup holder, and a large beverage occupying the front cup holder obstructs the driver's ability to pull the hand brake. European cars were given a redesigned retractable cup holder in front.

The front bumper cover offered inadequate ground clearance to clear a curb in a parking space, whereby the bumper cover could hook onto the curb and be torn off the vehicle. In the US, a class-action lawsuit regarding this problem was filed in 2009, and a settlement was reached awarding owners a $140 reimbursement for repair costs.

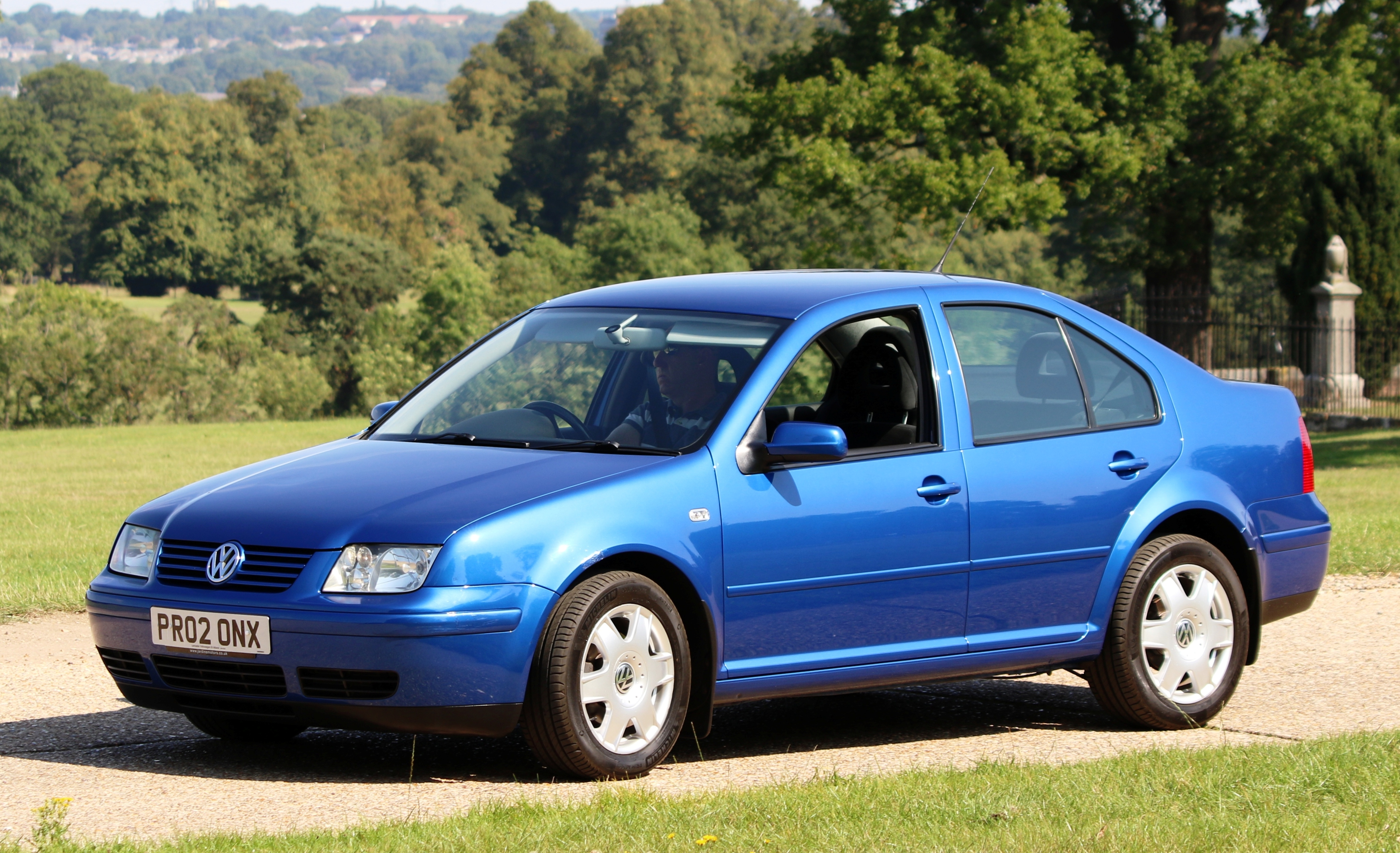
2002 Volkswagen Jetta, 1984 cc

Owners reported windows falling into the doors, electrical problems, body panels rusting from the inside out, especially on the front wheel arches and wagon lift door, and emissions system defects. The fourth generation takes approximately 52 hours per vehicle to assemble in the Puebla factory.

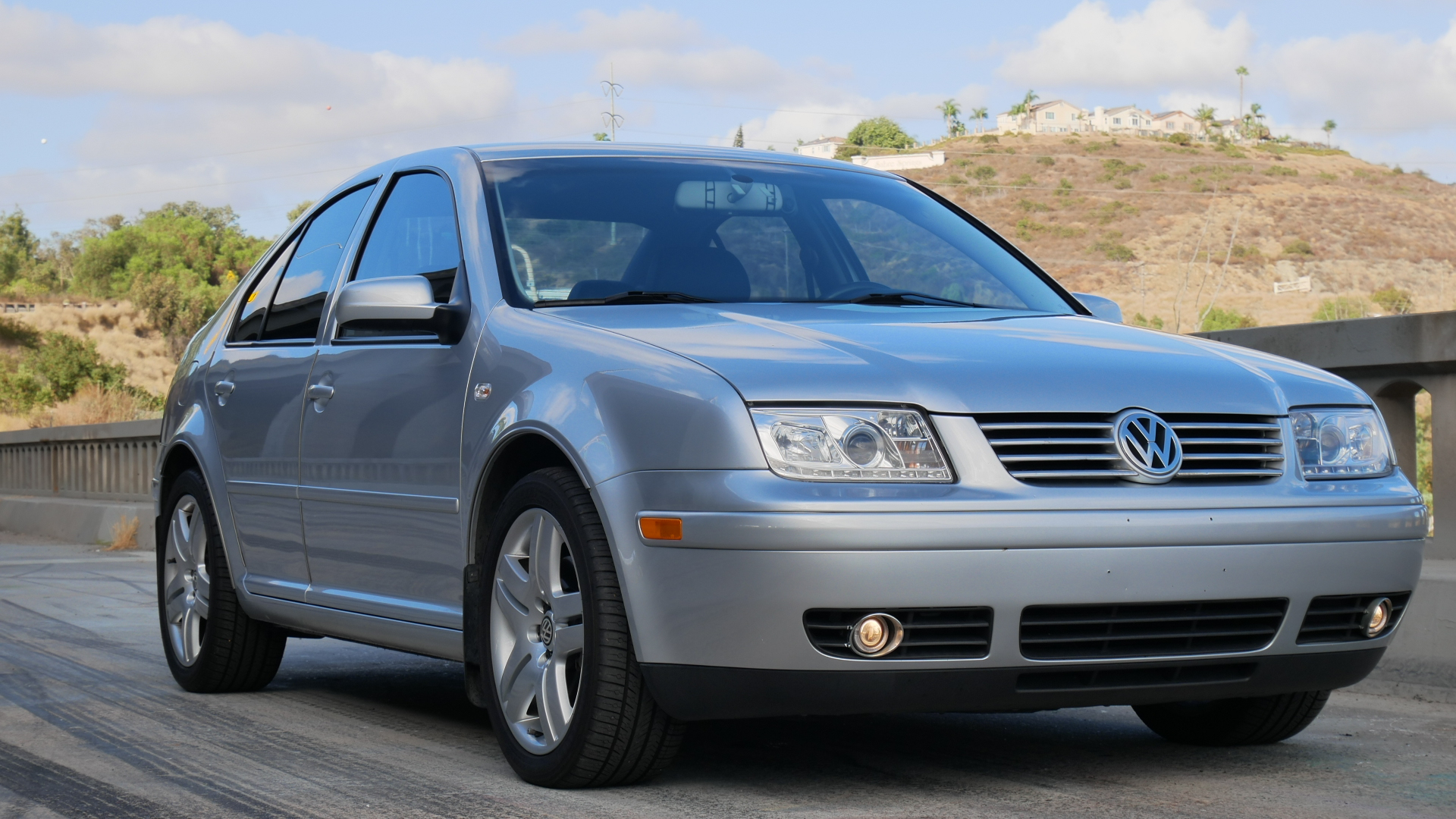
Volkswagen Jetta GLX with 2.8 VR6 engine

== Engines ==
Model	Years	Engine and code		Displacement	Power	Torque
Petrol
1.4	1998–2005	I4 16V	AHW/AXP/BCA	1,390 cc (85 cu in)	55 kW (74 hp; 75 PS) @ 5,000 rpm	126 N⋅m (93 lb⋅ft) @ 3,800 rpm
1.6	1998–2000	I4 8V	AEH/AKL/APF	1,595 cc (97.3 cu in)	74 kW (99 hp; 101 PS) @ 5,600 rpm	145 N⋅m (107 lb⋅ft) @ 3,800 rpm
1.6	2000–2005	I4 8V	AVU/BFQ	1,595 cc (97.3 cu in)	75 kW (101 hp; 102 PS) @ 5,600 rpm	148 N⋅m (109 lb⋅ft) @ 3,800 rpm
1.6	2000–2005	I4 16V	AUS/AZD/ATN/BCB	1,598 cc (97.5 cu in)	77 kW (103 hp; 105 PS) @ 5,700 rpm	148 N⋅m (109 lb⋅ft) @ 4,500 rpm
1.6 FSI	2001–2005	I4 16V	BAD	1,598 cc (97.5 cu in)	81 kW (109 hp; 110 PS) @ 5,800 rpm	155 N⋅m (114 lb⋅ft) @ 4,400 rpm
2.0	1998–2001	I4 8V	APK/AQY	1,984 cc (121.1 cu in)	85 kW (114 hp; 116 PS) @ 5,200 rpm	170 N⋅m (125 lb⋅ft) @ 2,400 rpm
2.0	2001–2005	I4 8V	AVH/AZG/AZH/BEV	1,984 cc (121.1 cu in)	85 kW (114 hp; 116 PS) @ 5,400 rpm	172 N⋅m (127 lb⋅ft) @ 3,200 rpm
1.8	2001–2005	I4 20V	AGN/BAF	1,781 cc (108.7 cu in)	92 kW (123 hp; 125 PS) @ 5,900 rpm	170 N⋅m (125 lb⋅ft) @ 3,500 rpm
1.8 T	2000–2005	I4 20V	AWD/AWW/BAE	1,781 cc (108.7 cu in)	110 kW (148 hp; 150 PS) @ 5,700 rpm	210 N⋅m (155 lb⋅ft) @ 1,750–4,600 rpm
1.8 T Bora R	2005–2007	I4 20V	BTH	1,781 cc (108.7 cu in)	132 kW (177 hp; 179 PS) @ 5,700 rpm	235 N⋅m (173 lb⋅ft) @ 2,000–4,700 rpm
2.3 V5	1998–2001	VR5 10V	AGZ	2,324 cc (141.8 cu in)	110 kW (148 hp; 150 PS) @ 6,200 rpm	209 N⋅m (154 lb⋅ft) @ 3,300 rpm
2.8 V6	1999–2001	VR6 12V	AAA/AFP	2,792 cc (170.4 cu in)	132 kW (177 hp; 179 PS) @ 5,800 rpm	245 N⋅m (181 lb⋅ft) @ 3,200 rpm
2.3 V5	2000–2003	VR5 20V	AQN	2,324 cc (141.8 cu in)	125 kW (168 hp; 170 PS) @ 6,200 rpm	220 N⋅m (162 lb⋅ft) @ 3,300 rpm
1.8 T	2001–2005	I4 20V	AUQ	1,781 cc (108.7 cu in)	132 kW (177 hp; 179 PS) @ 5,500 rpm	235 N⋅m (173 lb⋅ft) @ 1,950–5,000 rpm
2.8 V6	2001–2004	VR6 24V	AQP/AUE/BDE	2,792 cc (170.4 cu in)	150 kW (201 hp; 204 PS) @ 6,000 rpm	270 N⋅m (199 lb⋅ft) @ 3,200 rpm
Diesel
1.9 SDI	1998–2005	I4 8V	AGP/AQM	1,896 cc (115.7 cu in)	50 kW (67 hp; 68 PS) @ 4,200 rpm	133 N⋅m (98 lb⋅ft) @ 2,200–2,600 rpm
1.9 TDI	1998–2003	I4 8V	AGR/ALH	1,896 cc (115.7 cu in)	66 kW (89 hp; 90 PS) @ 3,750 rpm	210 N⋅m (155 lb⋅ft) @ 1,900 rpm
1.9 TDI	2000–2005	I4 8V	ATD/AXR	1,896 cc (115.7 cu in)	74 kW (99 hp; 101 PS) @ 4,000 rpm	240 N⋅m (177 lb⋅ft) @ 1,800–2,400 rpm
1.9 TDI	1998–2001	I4 8V	AHF/ASV	1,896 cc (115.7 cu in)	81 kW (109 hp; 110 PS) @ 4,150 rpm	235 N⋅m (173 lb⋅ft) @ 1,900 rpm
1.9 TDI	1998–2000	I4 8V	AJM	1,896 cc (115.7 cu in)	85 kW (114 hp; 116 PS) @ 4,000 rpm	285 N⋅m (210 lb⋅ft) @ 1,900 rpm
1.9 TDI	1999–2001	I4 8V	AUY	1,896 cc (115.7 cu in)	85 kW (114 hp; 116 PS) @ 4,000 rpm	310 N⋅m (229 lb⋅ft) @ 1,900 rpm
1.9 TDI	2001–2005	I4 8V	ASZ	1,896 cc (115.7 cu in)	96 kW (129 hp; 131 PS) @ 4,000 rpm	310 N⋅m (229 lb⋅ft) @ 1,900 rpm
1.9 TDI	2000–2005	I4 8V	ARL	1,896 cc (115.7 cu in)	110 kW (148 hp; 150 PS) @ 4,000 rpm	320 N⋅m (236 lb⋅ft) @ 1,900 rpm

== Bora Variant (wagon/estate version) ==
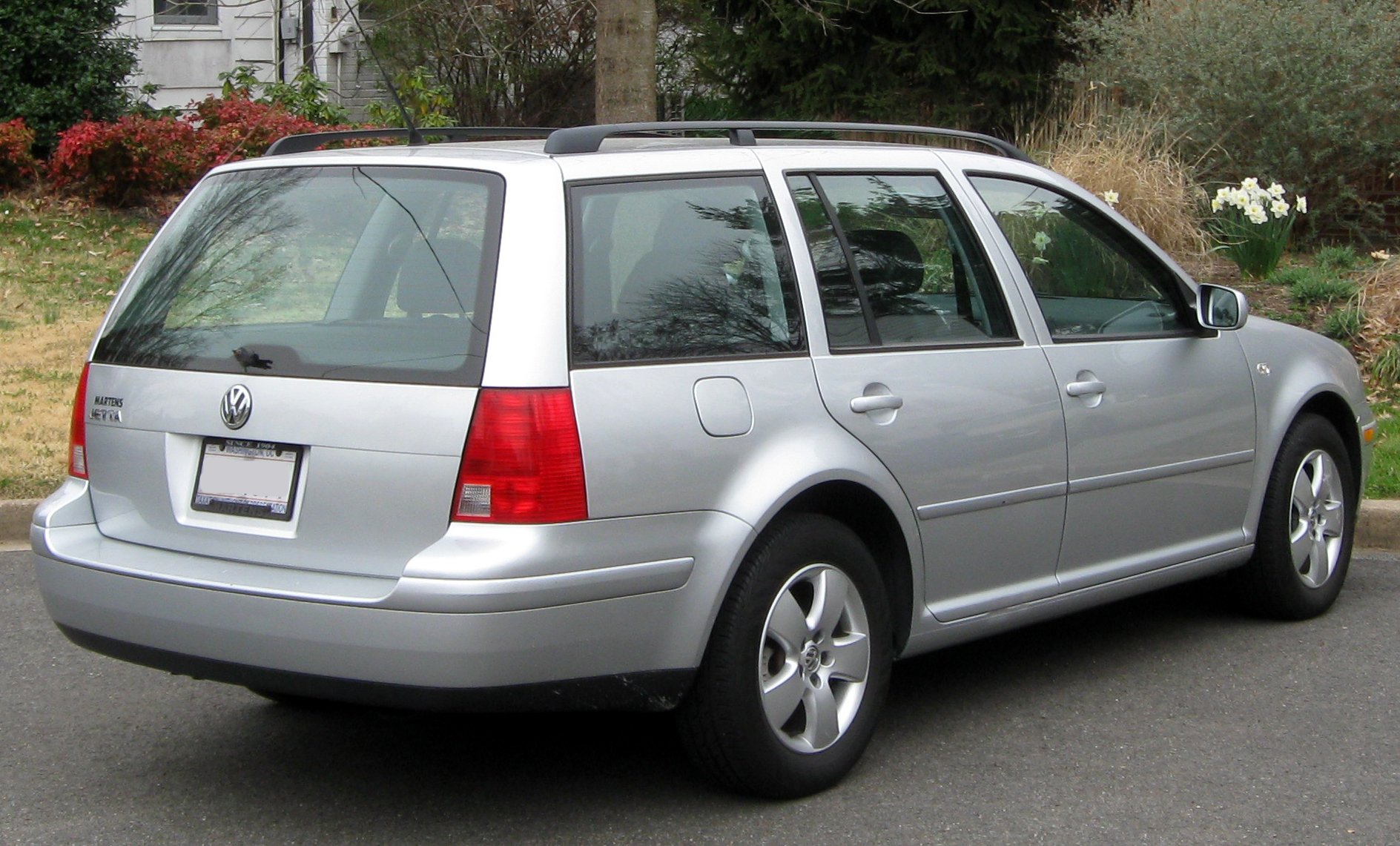
Volkswagen Jetta wagon (US)

Volkswagen introduced an estate/station wagon version of the fourth-generation car at the 2001 Los Angeles Auto Show as the first C-segment wagon Volkswagen offered in North America — the body style solely manufactured in Wolfsburg. The wagon offered 963 L (34 ft^{3}) of volume with the rear seat up, and with rear seats were folded provided 1,473 L (52 ft^{3}).

In Europe, the estate version was at times marketed as a Golf wagon, either in addition to or instead of the Bora. Other than different front bumpers, fenders, headlights, and hood, the cars were identical. In some countries, VW marketed both Golf Variant and Bora Variant, with the Bora Variant being more upmarket than its counterpart.

== Extended production ==
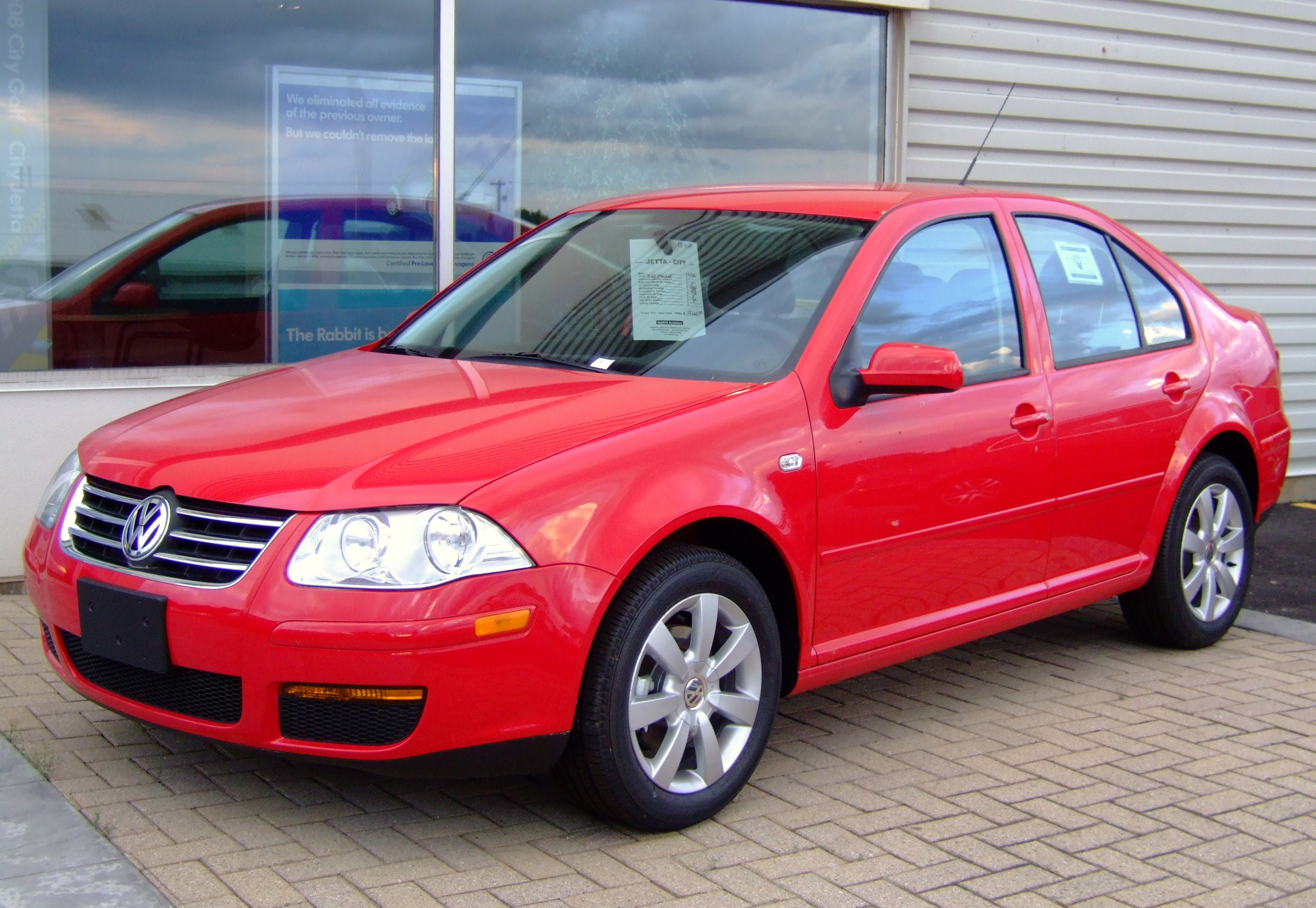
2008 Volkswagen City Jetta (Canada) Front

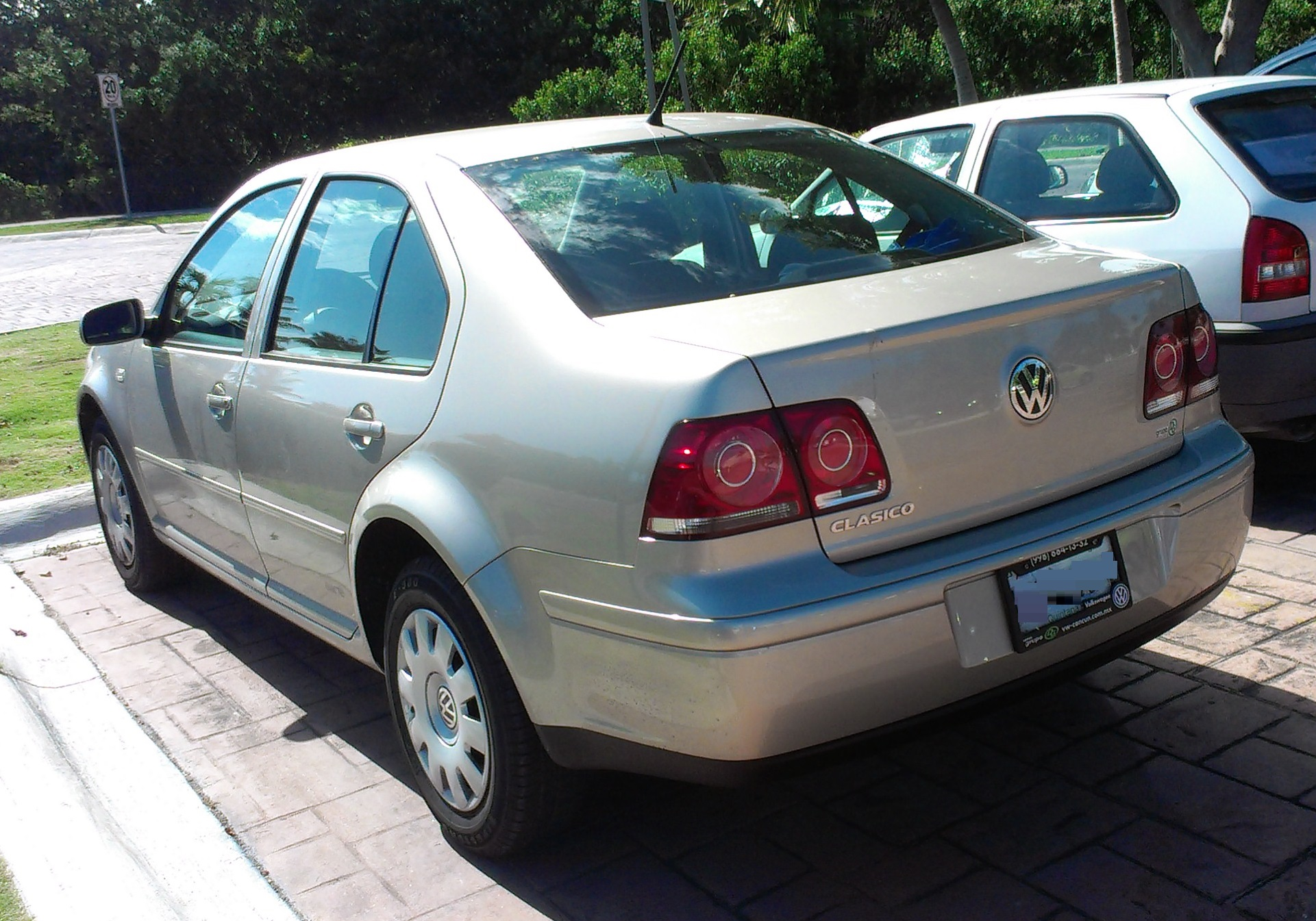
2009 Volkswagen Clásico (Mexico) Rear view

As of 2008, the fourth-generation car marketed alongside the fifth-generation due to higher pricing of the fifth-generation in some countries such as Colombia, China, Canada, Dominican Republic, Mexico, Brazil, and Argentina. Like its second-generation predecessor, the Mark 4 continued to be manufactured and marketed in China by Volkswagen Group's joint venture partner FAW-Volkswagen.

In October 2006, Volkswagen re-released the fourth-generation Golf and Jetta in Canada (for the 2007 model year) as the City Jetta, to allow Volkswagen to be more competitive in the compact class. In 2008, the car was restyled to bring its looks up to date with the Volkswagen range. Its engine was the 2.0-l, eight-valve SOHC 85 kW (116 PS; 114 hp) gasoline four-cylinder with an available six-speed tiptronic (with Sport mode) that was added as an option in 2008. In 2009, both model names were changed to Jetta City and Golf City. The two models were discontinued, the Jetta City for 2010 MY and Golf City for MY 2011. The MK4.5 City Jetta (Clásico/Bora) was manufactured alongside the fifth generation in the Puebla Assembly Plant in Mexico.

== See also ==
- List of Volkswagen Group diesel engines
- List of Volkswagen Group petrol engines
- Compact car
- Volkswagen Group A platform
