= Volkswagen Golf Mk4 =

Fourth generation of Golf compact car

Volkswagen Golf Mk4 (1J)
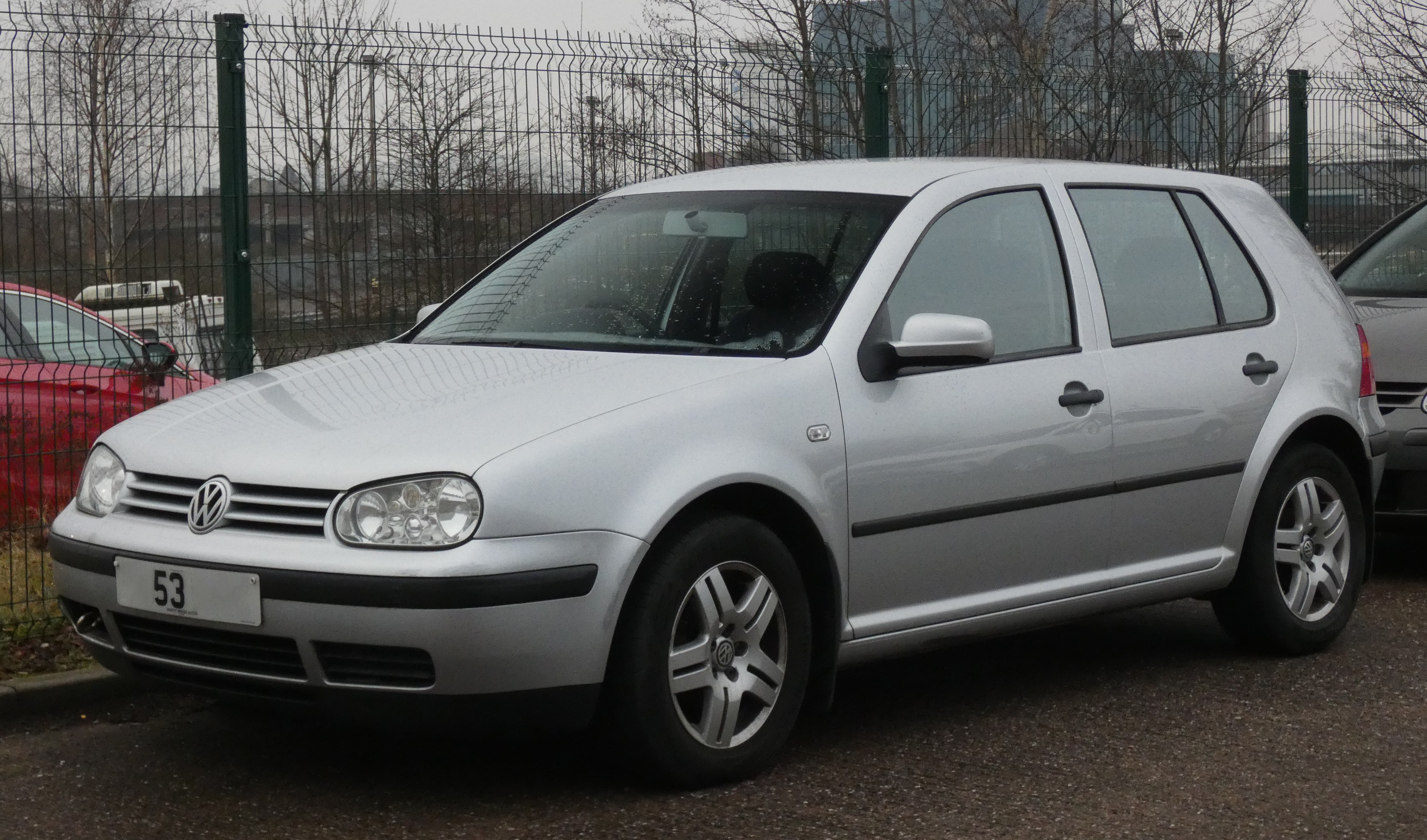

Overview
- Manufacturer: Volkswagen
- Also called: VW Bora HS (China, 2006–2008); VW City Golf (Canada, 2007–2010); VW Golf Town (2009–2010)
- Production: October 1997–2006 (Europe); 1999–2014 (Brazil); 2003–2010 (China)
- Assembly: Germany: Wolfsburg; Germany: Zwickau (Volkswagen Zwickau-Mosel Plant); Brazil: São José dos Pinhais (Volkswagen do Brasil); Mexico: Puebla (Volkswagen de México); Belgium: Brussels; Slovakia: Bratislava; Bosnia and Herzegovina: Sarajevo (Volkswagen Sarajevo); South Africa: Uitenhage; China: Changchun
- Designer: Peter Schreyer; Hartmut Warkuß

Body and chassis
- Class: Compact car (C)
- Body style: 3-door hatchback 5-door hatchback 5-door station wagon
- Layout: Front engine, front-wheel-drive / four-wheel-drive
- Platform: Volkswagen Group A4 (PQ34) platform
- Related: Volkswagen Jetta Mk4 (Bora); Audi A3 Mk1; Audi TT Mk1; Volkswagen New Beetle; SEAT León Mk1; SEAT Toledo Mk2; Škoda Octavia Mk1

Powertrain
- Engine: Petrol: 1.4 L EA111 16v I4; 1.6 L EA827 I4; 1.6 L EA111 16v I4; 1.6 L EA111 FSI 16v I4; 1.8 L EA113 20v I4; 1.8 L EA113 20v turbo I4; 2.0 L EA827 I4; 2.3 L AGZ VR5; 2.3 L AQN 20v VR5; 2.8 L EA390 VR6; 2.8 L EA390 24v VR6; 3.2 L EA390 24v VR6 (R32); Petrol CNG: 2.0 L ATM I4; Diesel: 1.9 L EA180 SDI I4; 1.9 L EA180 TDI I4 (Verteilerpumpe - VE); 1.9 L EA188 TDI PD I4 (Pumpe Düse)
- Transmission: 01M 4-speed automatic 09A 5-speed tiptronic automatic 02J 5-speed manual 02M 6-speed manual 6-speed DSG - R32 only

Dimensions
- Wheelbase: 2,512 mm (98.9 in); R32: 2,517 mm (99.1 in)
- Length: 1998–2002 GTI/Golf: 4,148 mm (163.3 in); 2003–2006 GTI/Golf: 4,188 mm (164.9 in); R32: 4,176 mm (164.4 in); Bora/Jetta: 4,376 mm (172.3 in)
- Width: 1,735 mm (68.3 in)
- Height: 1,440 mm (56.7 in); R32: 1,425 mm (56.1 in); City Golf: 1,445 mm (56.9 in)

Chronology
- Predecessor: Volkswagen Golf Mk3
- Successor: Volkswagen Golf Mk5

The Volkswagen Golf Mk4 (or VW Type 1J) is a compact car, the fourth generation of the Volkswagen Golf and the successor to the Volkswagen Golf Mk3. Launched in October 1997 for the 1998 model year, it was the best-selling car in Europe in 2001 (though it slipped to second place, behind the Peugeot 206, in 2002).

The Mk4 was a deliberate attempt to take the Volkswagen Golf series further upmarket with a high-quality interior and higher equipment levels - a policy which Volkswagen began a year earlier with the Passat B5. This move however however placed the Golf in direct competition with its luxury branded stablemate - the Audi A3 - with some of the higher trim versions of the Golf actually being as expensive as the A3.

It was replaced in late 2003 for the 2004 model year by the Volkswagen Golf Mk5 in European markets. However, manufacturing continued in South America and China for developing markets until 2014.

== Design and engineering ==
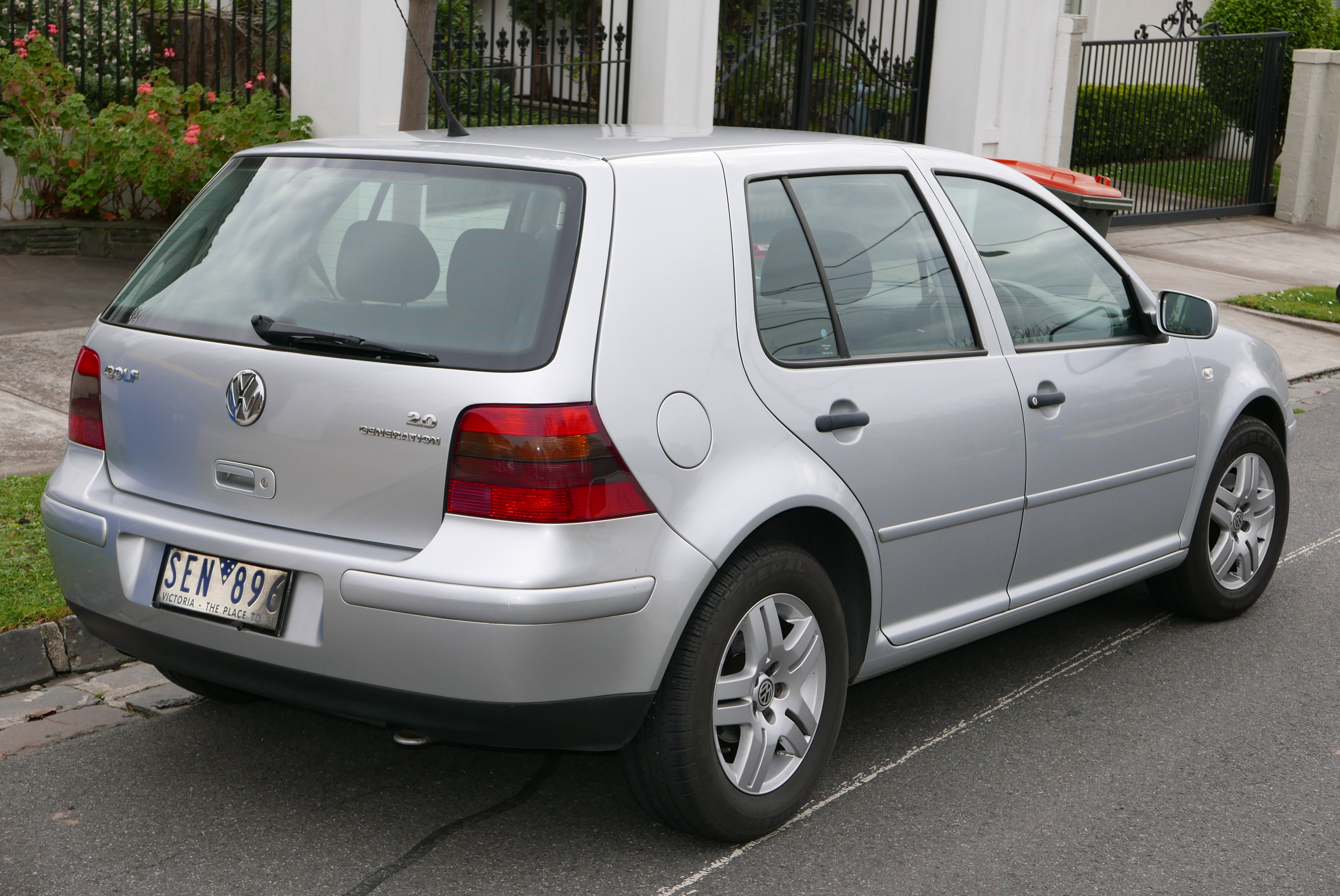
Generation 2.0 5-door hatchback

As with the larger Passat, launched a year earlier, the MK4 Golf helped form a part of Volkswagen's strategy of moving its products upmarket to plug a gap between mainstream economy cars and premium cars, with SEAT and Škoda, two other VW Group owned marques, poised to fill the gap below the new Golf. In fact, the quality of the Golf was comparable with the Audi A3, which was the first car based on this floor pan when it was launched a year earlier, but cost considerably more than most of its competitors.

This generation of the Golf brought in the Haldex 4 Wheel Drive system, which was previously only available on Audi products. The system was used with the 1.9TDI Sport Engines, i.e. PD115 (then replaced by the PD130) and the PD150 Engines (Codes: AJM/ASZ/ARL) and with the VR6-powered models. This featured a totally revised rear axle and rear floor pan, which was shared with the Audi TT 8N. This went on to be used in the R32 model in 2003–2004.

This version of the Golf was the only version to do away with the GTD nameplate—there were petrol and diesel versions of the GTI, which featured slightly lowered suspension, the 1.8T or the 1.9 TDI (PD 150) and premium interior features like Climatronic, full leather, and wood trims; however, it was not as sporty as the preceding generations of the GTI. As part of VW's move upmarket, the firm downplayed the sportiness of the hatchback in favour of comfort. The Mk4 GTI is looked down upon because of this, and VW restored the GTI's reputation as a sporting hatch with the 25th Anniversary Edition and the Mk5 Golf that followed it.

It was also one of the first Golfs to come with xenon headlamps (optional) and rain-sensing wipers at the end of its manufacturing in Europe, and along with this, a full 12-year anti-corrosion warranty, which was rarely seen at this time.

The Mk4 Golf was praised for its quality improvements, but was criticized for its handling characteristics, and was compared with the Mk1 Ford Focus of the time, which had an independent rear suspension in the 2WD models, unlike the Mk4, which had a torsion beam rear axle setup in the 2WD models.

The Mk4 Golf platform remained widely used in the VW Group much after its demise in 2004 (2006 for the Bora and Variant models).

== Models ==
=== Golf Cabriolet ===
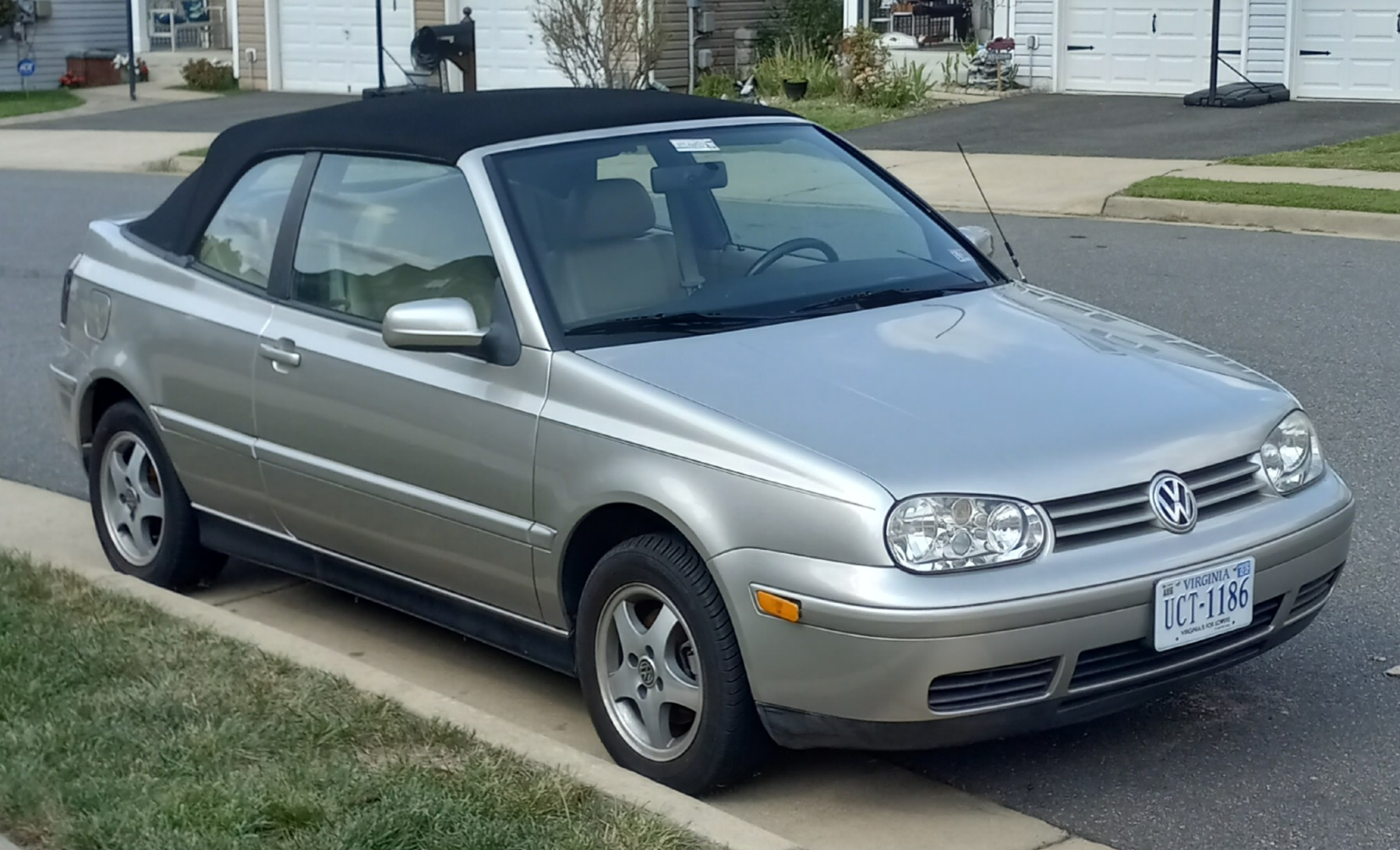

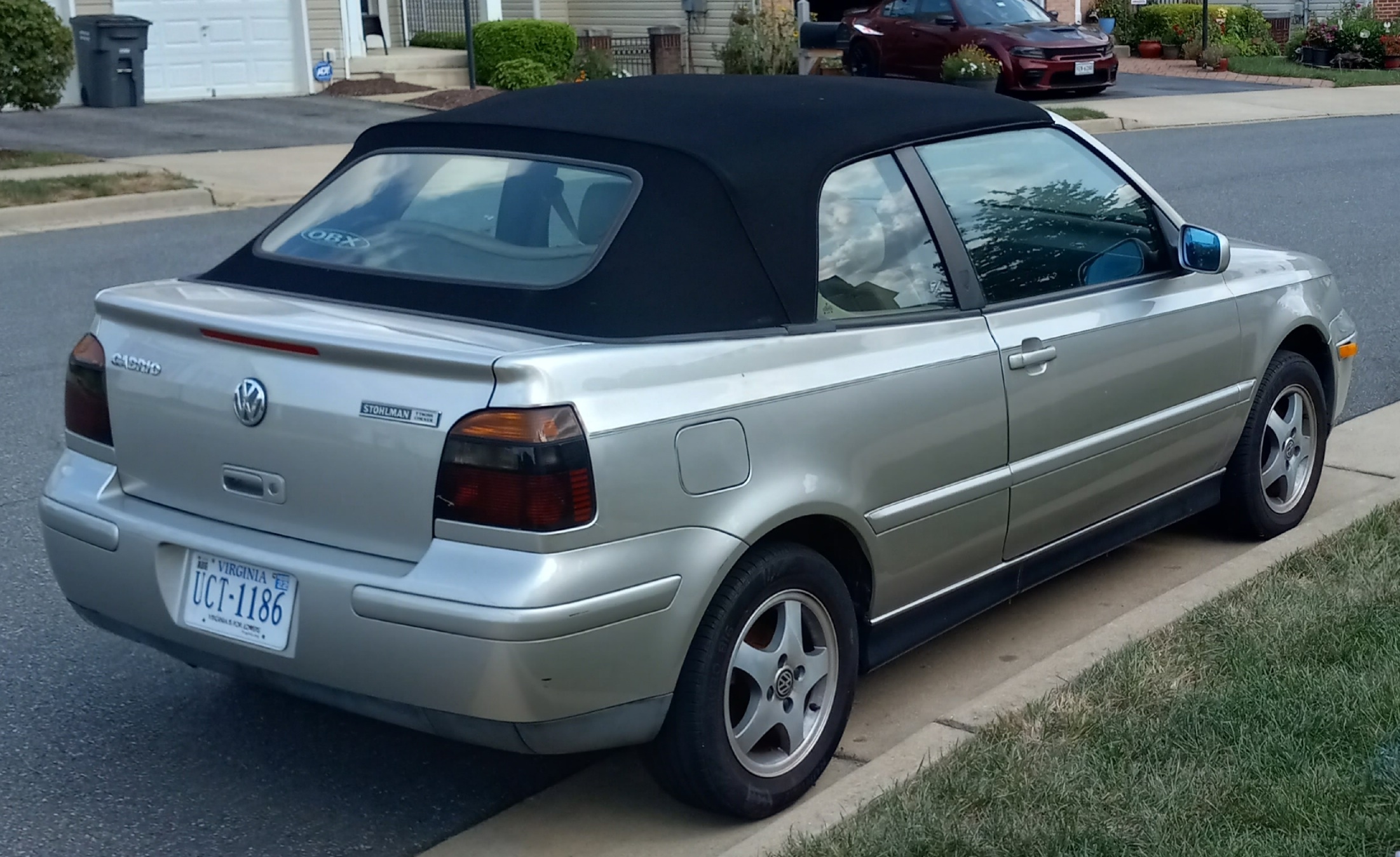
Golf Mk3.5 Cabriolet

As with the Mk2 Golf, Volkswagen did not make a convertible version of the Mk4 Golf. Instead, they facelifted the front bumper, grille, fenders, and hood of the Mk3 Golf Cabrio to resemble the styling of the Mk4 Golf (colloquially referred to as the Mk3.5). Changes to the rear included a redesigned trunk, which moved the number plate tub to a restyled rear bumper, in addition to a larger VW emblem more closely resembling the rear of a Mk4 Golf. VW incorporated other non-structural parts from the Mk4 as well, such as headlights, fender repeaters, side mirror caps, hatch handle, steering wheel airbag, etc. The interior remained largely similar to the Mk3 interior save for a Mk4 style three-spoke leather steering wheel, a textured dashboard (also known as "dimpled dash" or "shark skin dash"), heavily bolstered front seats with incorporated side airbags, and a chromed finish on several parts, such as the inner door handles, emergency brake button, door strikers, front seat-belt anchors, key lock cylinders, and shifter button in automatic transmission equipped cars. The instrument panel was updated with a relocated hazard light switch and blue and red backlighting, as found in the Mk4. Technical updates, beginning with the 2000 model, include the immobilizer and engine computer from the Mk4 Golf being retrofitted to the older Mk3 engine mechanicals.

=== Variant ===
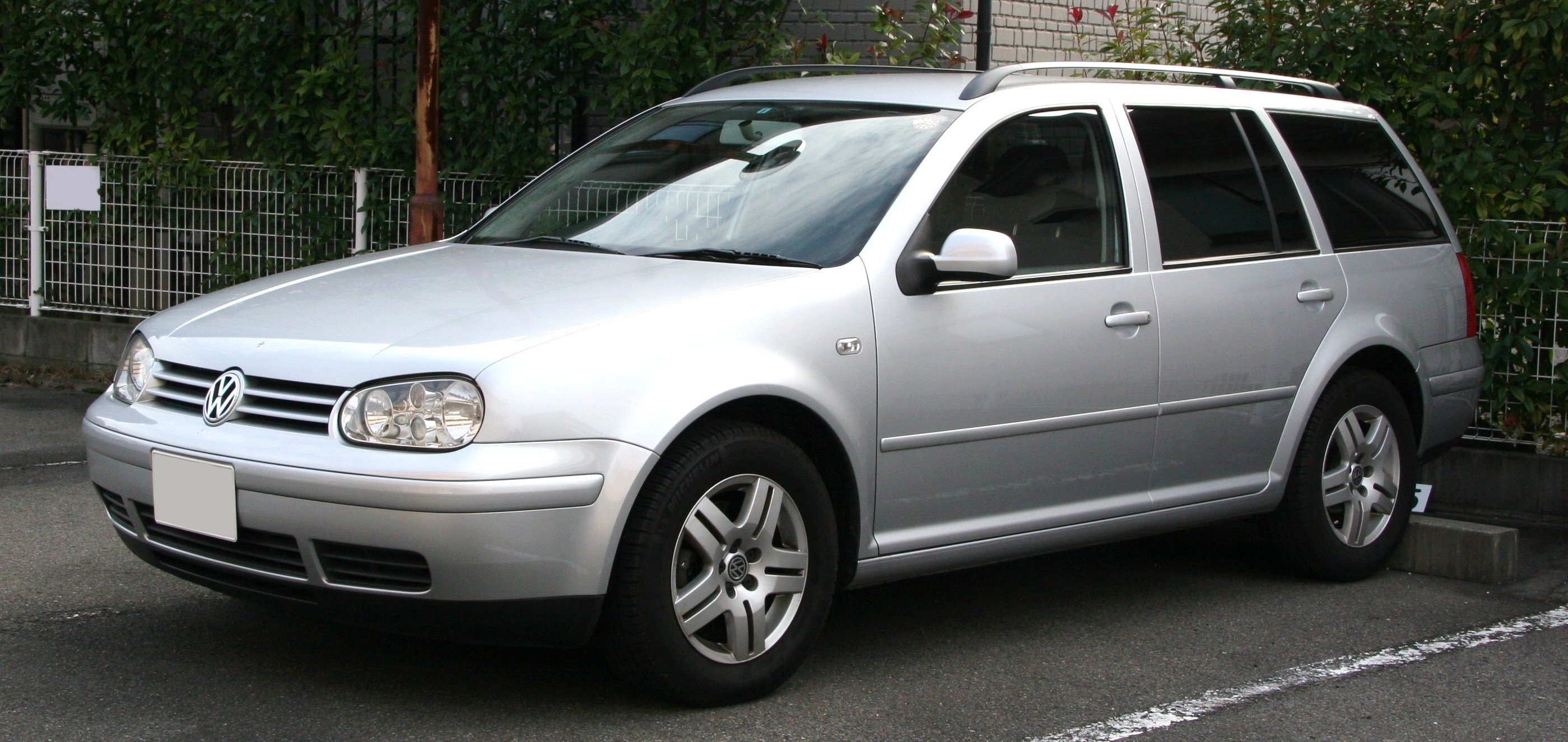

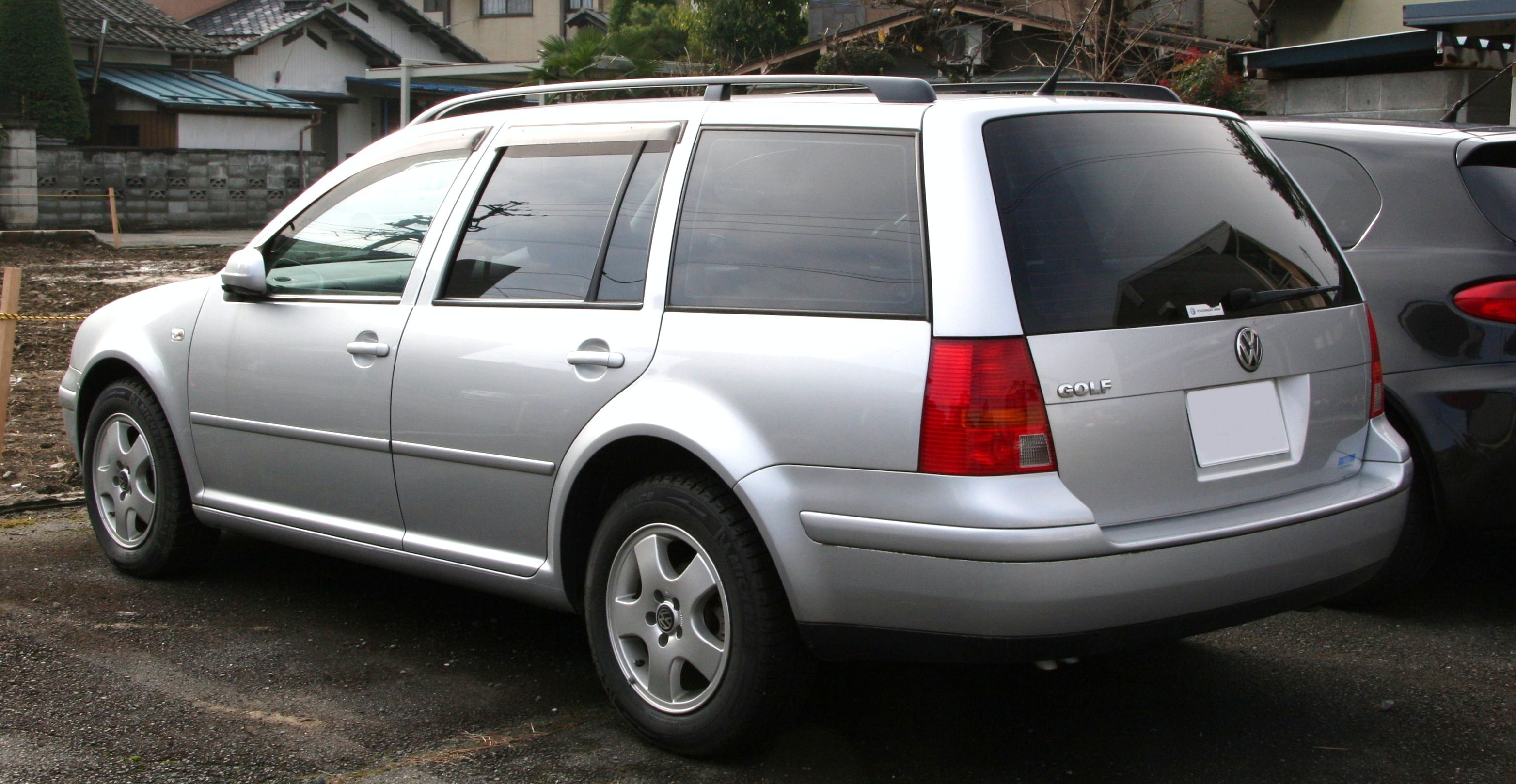
Golf Mk4 Variant

The Volkswagen Golf Mk4 Variant was introduced in 1999. It was discontinued in 2006, and succeeded in 2007 by the Volkswagen Golf Mk5 Variant. Unlike the Mk3, it was offered in North America with the "Jetta" name with corresponding front styling. The "Jetta Wagon" was used in North America instead of the "Bora" name.

=== Volkswagen Bora/Jetta Mk4 ===
Volkswagen produced a saloon version of the Mk4 Golf, launched around a year later. As with previous incarnations of the Golf, it had its own identity, and this time it was called the Volkswagen Bora, although the name Jetta remained in North America and South Africa. Unlike its predecessors, the Bora/Jetta featured unique rear doors, front wings and bonnet. The front doors were the only body panels it shared with the Golf. The interior, though, was almost identical to the Golf, featuring very minor styling changes like its predecessor.

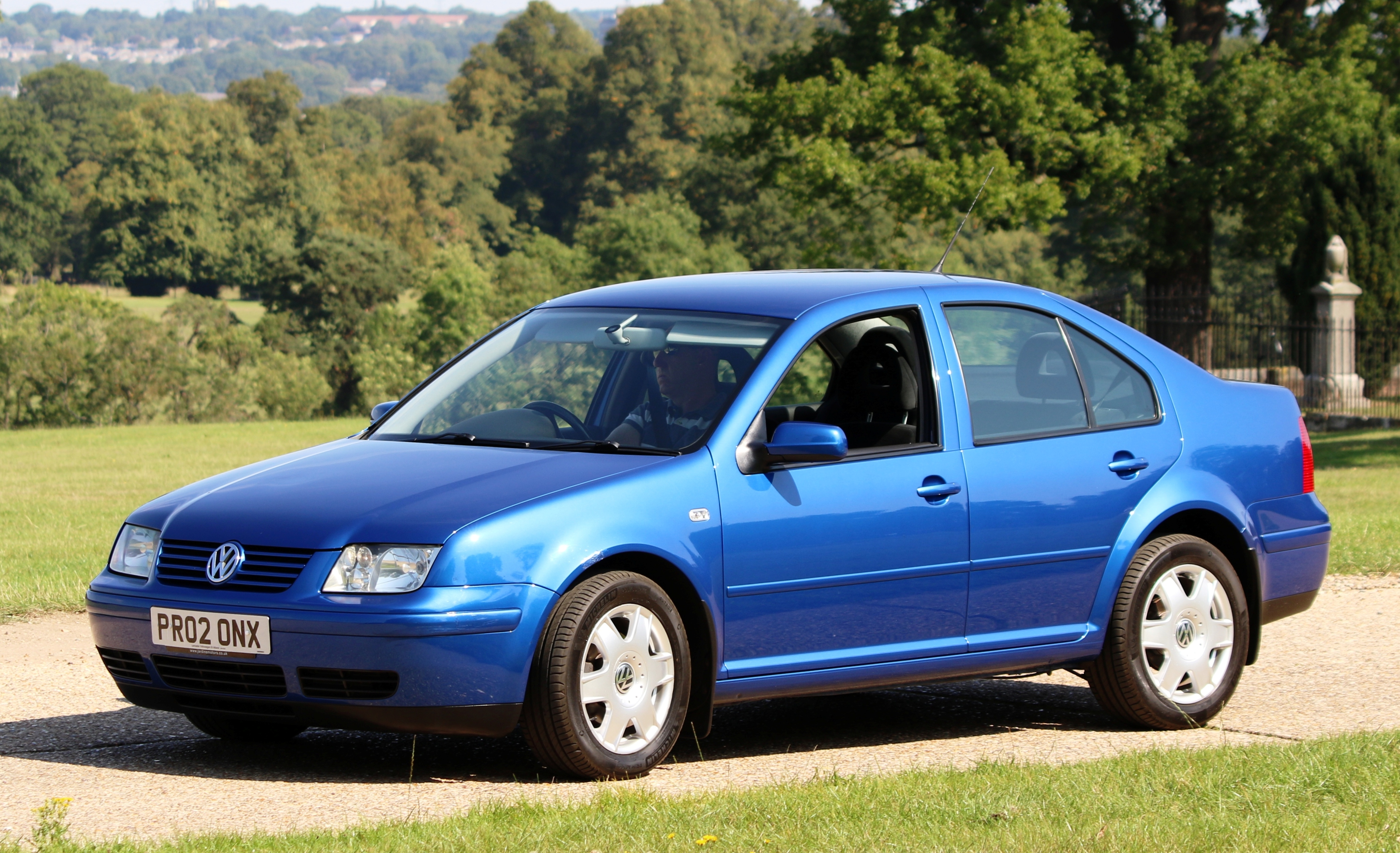
Volkswagen Jetta

The Golf 4 was produced in Germany, South Africa, Slovakia, Brazil, Belgium, and China. Eastern European locations making the Golf 4 included Bosnia and Herzegovina, in Vogošća, which also made Mk1 and Mk2 models.

The Golf/Jetta Mk4 engine choices included 1.4, 1.6, 1.8, 2.0, 2.3 litre VR5, 2.8 litre V6 and 3.2 litre R32 petrol engines, 1.9-litre naturally aspirated diesel SDI engine, and a 1.9-litre turbodiesel, with power ranging from 90 to 150 PS (66 to 110 kW). The R32 engine was not added to the range until much later, while the 2.3 V5 was a new addition to the Golf range. The rest of the engine line-up differed little from that of the MK3 Golf.

Volkswagen made a choice of three and five-door hatchbacks or a five-door station wagon available. The European Golf wagon, launched in the spring of 1999, was nearly identical to the North American Jetta Wagon. The only difference was the use of the Golf front headlights, bumpers, grille, hood, and fenders, as these parts are interchangeable between the Mk4 Golf and Bora/Jetta.

The Golf 4 was introduced to North America in mid-1999. Available engines for the Golf at its introduction to the American market were a 2.0L gasoline engine, and a 48mpg 1.9L TDI engine. In 2004, the updated 1.9L TDI PD or Pumpe-Düse engine was installed in the Golf and Jetta. The Pumpe-Düse or pump nozzle was a Robert Bosch extreme high-pressure fuel injection system for direct cylinder injection. A 1.8 L turbocharged gas engine was introduced in 2000, along with the 12-valve 2.8L VR6. At the same time, the 1.6L 8-valve unit was replaced with the 16-valve unit from the Polo GTI, but detuned to 77 kW (105 PS). For 2000, Volkswagen opted for the relatively new 1.8L 20-valve turbocharged gasoline engine as a base engine for the GTI. The top-of-the-line GLX model was equipped with Volkswagen's 2.8 L VR6, which produced 174 hp (130 kW). The VR6 engine, with its narrow 15-degree Vee design, was unique to Volkswagen. This engine is shorter and lighter (featuring a single cylinder head) than other V6 engines. For the 2002.5 model year, Volkswagen introduced a 24-valve version of its VR6 engine to the North American market under engine code BDF. This engine had the same torque characteristics as the older 12-valve version, which had been carried over from the Mk3 Golf under engine codes AAA and AFP. The 24-valve version gained an additional 26 hp (19 kW) over the 12-valve to reach 204BHP. In Europe, the VR6-engined V6 4Motion variant was produced from 1999 with 204BHP and a 24-valve engine from the outset, using engine codes AUE and AQP. In 2002, the European market began using the BDF-code engine at the same time as the North American market. This had the same 204BHP power output but now featured variable valve timing on the exhaust valves, which allowed the engine to rev more freely in the higher ranges, and now had "coil-on-plug" ignition coils. The 1.8T and VR6 models continued until 2005, when the Mk4 platform came to an end in North America (except Canada). Both the Mk4 Golf and the Mk4 Jetta were still in production in Brazil, Mexico, and China as of 2008, with these models nicknamed the Mk4.5.

The Mk4.5 Brazilian Golf TDI PD was sold in Canada due to its popularity as a full 2006 model in base, GL and GLS trim levels for the full model year, as there were no diesel engine versions for the North American 2007 Mk5 Golf (Rabbit).

In Europe, trim levels were country-specific; however, the base trim levels were: Trendline, Comfortline, Highline and GTI. Any others, like the Ocean, Pacific and Edition Trim levels, were modifications of the regular four trim levels.

The United Kingdom sold the Mk4 with the following trim levels: E, S, SE, GT TDI, GTI TDI, GTI and V5/V6/V6 4MOTION versions. The V5 was available in 150 bhp/110 kW (1997–2000) and 170 bhp/125 kW (1999–2003) versions.

== Special editions ==
=== GTI 25th Anniversary Edition (2001) / 337 Edition (2002) ===
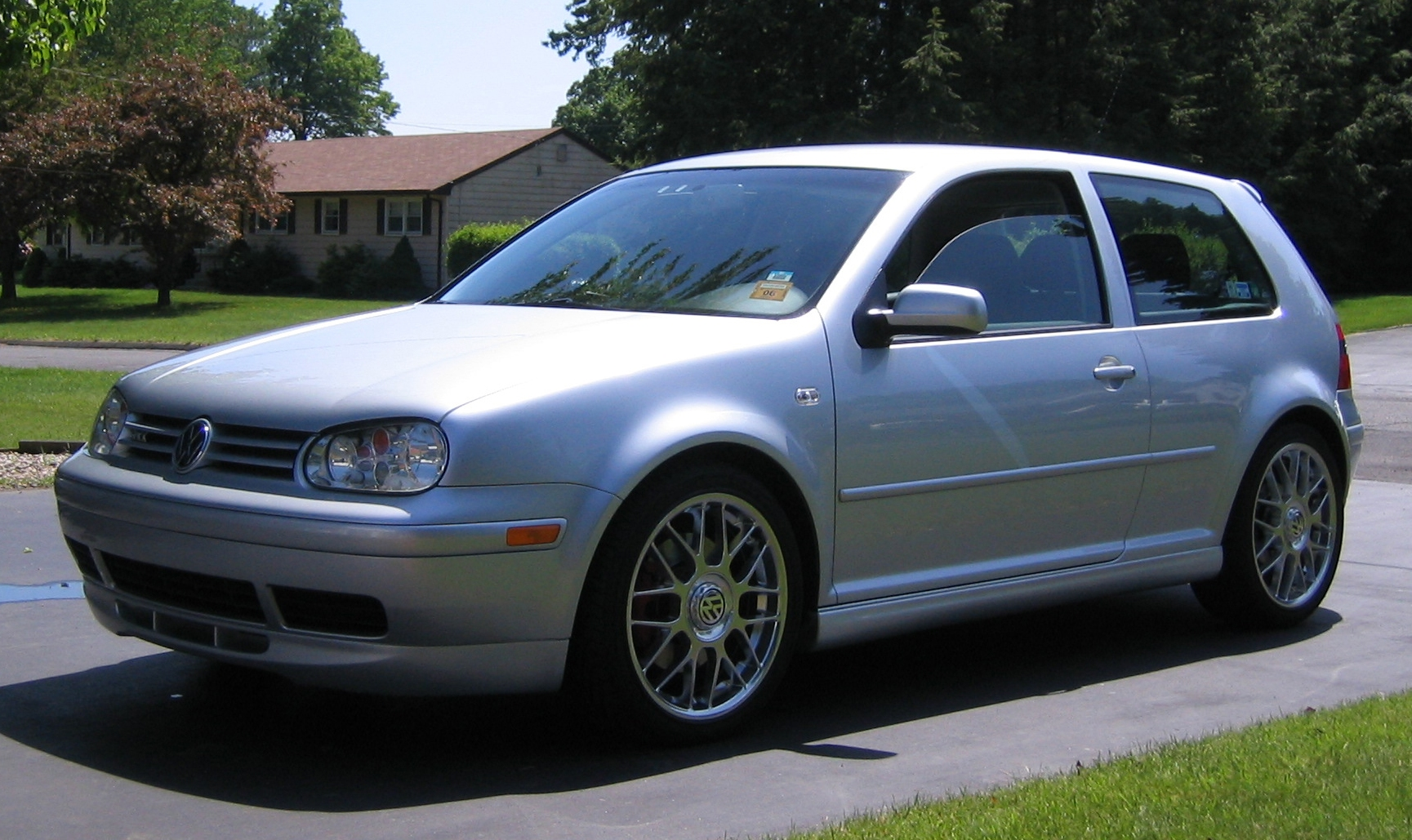
Volkswagen GTI 337 Edition

The GTI 25th Anniversary Edition was a special version of the Golf GTI for the European market to commemorate the first GTI, launched in 1976. The 25th Anniversary edition was available in three paint colour options: Tornado Red, Reflex Silver & Diamond Black.

The GTI 25th anniversary edition was equipped with many extra features not included in the standard GTI, which included: 18x7.5" BBS RC wheels with a special shot peened finish, a perforated leather steering wheel, shift boot, and handbrake, red accented seat belts, red and black upholstered Recaro seats, a body kit (front valance, side skirts, hatch spoiler, and rear valance), blackened headlights, a 02M 6-speed manual transmission, larger 312mm front brakes and 256mm vented rear brakes with red painted calipers, a lowered sport tuned suspension, and brushed aluminium interior trim.

At the 2002 New York International Auto Show, VW announced the 25th Anniversary Edition would be sold in the US Market as the GTI 337 Edition, named for the early 1970s Golf/GTI codename. Available only in Reflex Silver, the 337 Edition was substantially the same as the European 25th Anniversary GTI, albeit without the black headlight trim.

These models were never equipped with a sunroof to take the car back to its roots, the Mk1 GTI, and improve handling and performance. However, one instance of the 337 edition is known to have been specially ordered with a sunroof.

This version of the GTI was only available in a 3-door configuration and was also available with the PD150 TDI engine, running the shortest ratio EFF 02M 6 speed manual gearbox. (Standard GTI TDI models had the PD150 engine with the ERF 02M gearbox, the mid-way point for ratio length).

The UK versions of the Anniversary edition were numbered with individual plaques placed on the fusebox cover.

=== GTI 20th Anniversary Edition (North American market) ===
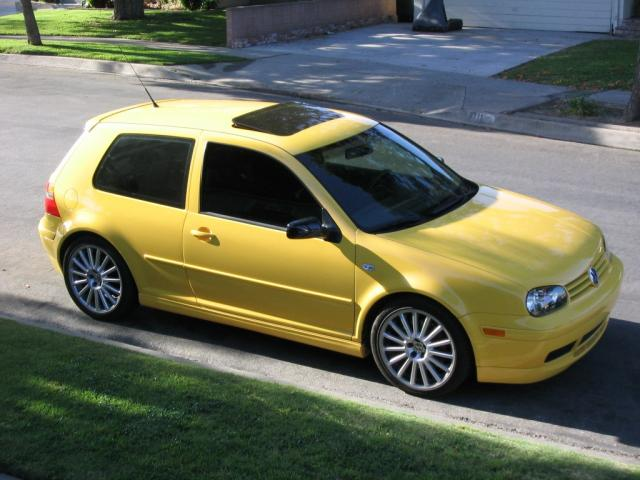
Volkswagen GTI 20th Anniversary Edition

Following the initial commemorative anniversary edition MK3 GTI produced in Europe in 1996, celebrating the introduction of the GTI model in 1976, and the popularity of the 25th anniversary edition GTI produced in 2001, Volkswagen of America produced 4,200 "20th Anniversary Edition" GTIs for 2003; 4,000 were shipped to the United States and 200 to Canada. This marked the 20th anniversary of the GTI's 1983 introduction to the U.S. and Canadian market, some seven years after the GTI was introduced to the European market. Several special features distinguish the 20th Anniversary GTI from the standard GTI, most of which were shared with the 337 Edition of 2002.

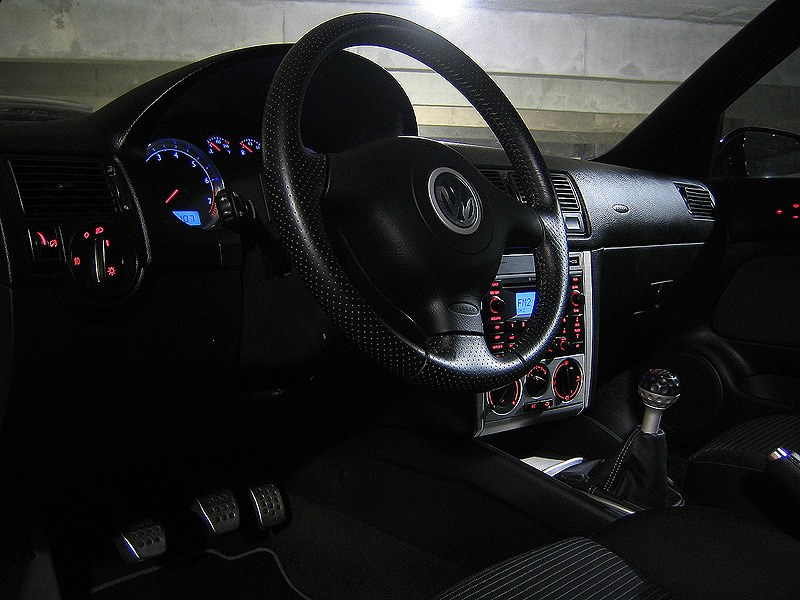
Volkswagen GTI 20th Anniversary Edition Interior

On the outside, the 20th Anniversary edition came with throwback red-lettered GTI logos on the left front and right rear. The rear was also accompanied by a vintage-look chrome rabbit. Similar to the 25th Anniversary edition, exterior included Votex front and rear valences, side skirts, and hatch spoiler, black headlight trim, black painted wing mirrors, and 18" OZ Aristo alloy wheels wrapped in Michelin Pilot Sport tires. These models were only produced in three colours: Imola Yellow, Jazz Blue, and Black Magic Pearl. Distribution of production was 50% Black Magic Pearl, 25% Jazz Blue and 25% Imola Yellow.

Inside, all 20th Anniversary GTIs included a sunroof, a black headliner, and a golf ball shift knob. The steering wheel, shifter boot, and handbrake handle were trimmed in black leather with silver stitching. Unique black cloth Recaro bucket seats with silver stitching accents and red GTI embroidery were also included. Aluminum trim came standard and included a numbered nameplate above the radio identifying the exact production number (US production only) of the vehicle. Volkswagen's premium eight-speaker Monsoon stereo system was also standard.

Mechanically, the 20th Anniversary Edition GTI is nearly identical to the GTI 337 Edition. Including the 6-speed manual 02M transmission, 30mm lowered suspension, and 1.8T engine. The brakes were also upgraded with 12.3" vented rotors up front and 10.3" vented rotors in the rear, as well as red powder-coated callipers.

== Golf R32 (2003) ==
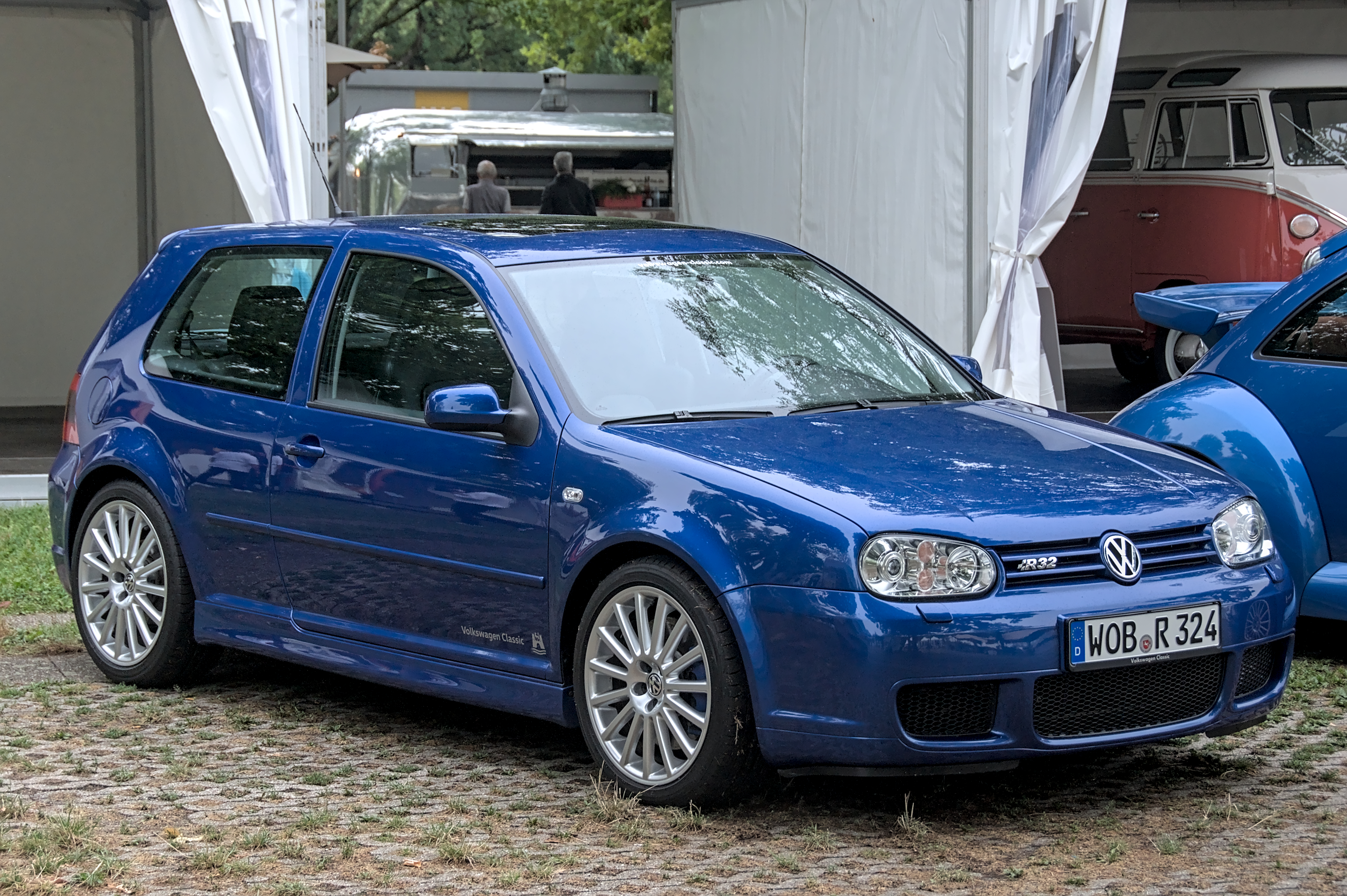
Deep Blue Pearl VW Golf R32 - front

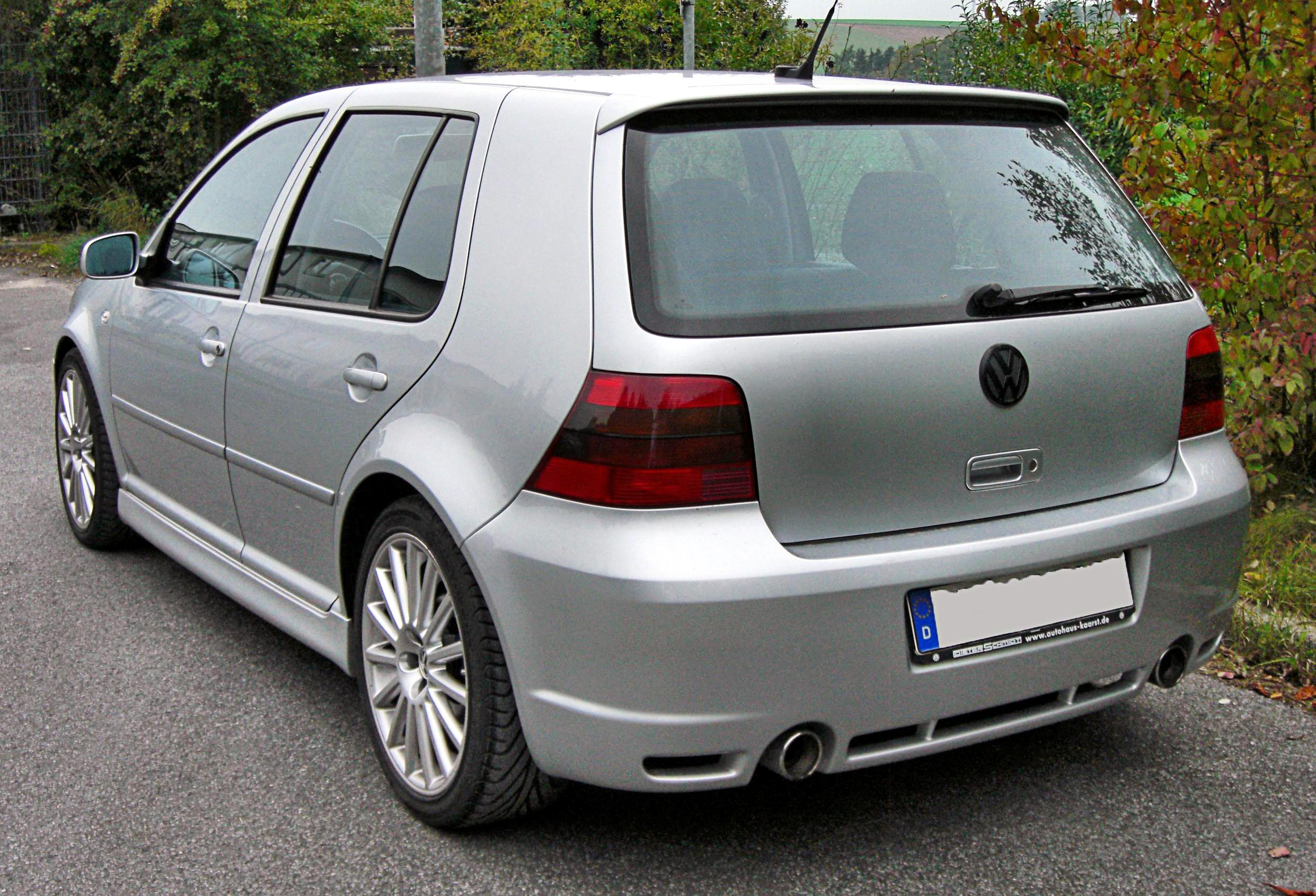
European-spec R32 - rear. The 5-door R32 was only offered for the European market.

In 2002, Volkswagen produced the Golf R32 in Europe as a 2003 model year. It was the world's first production car with a dual-clutch gearbox (DSG) — available for the German market. Due to unexpected popularity, Volkswagen decided to sell the car in the United States and Australia for the 2004 model year Volkswagen R32.

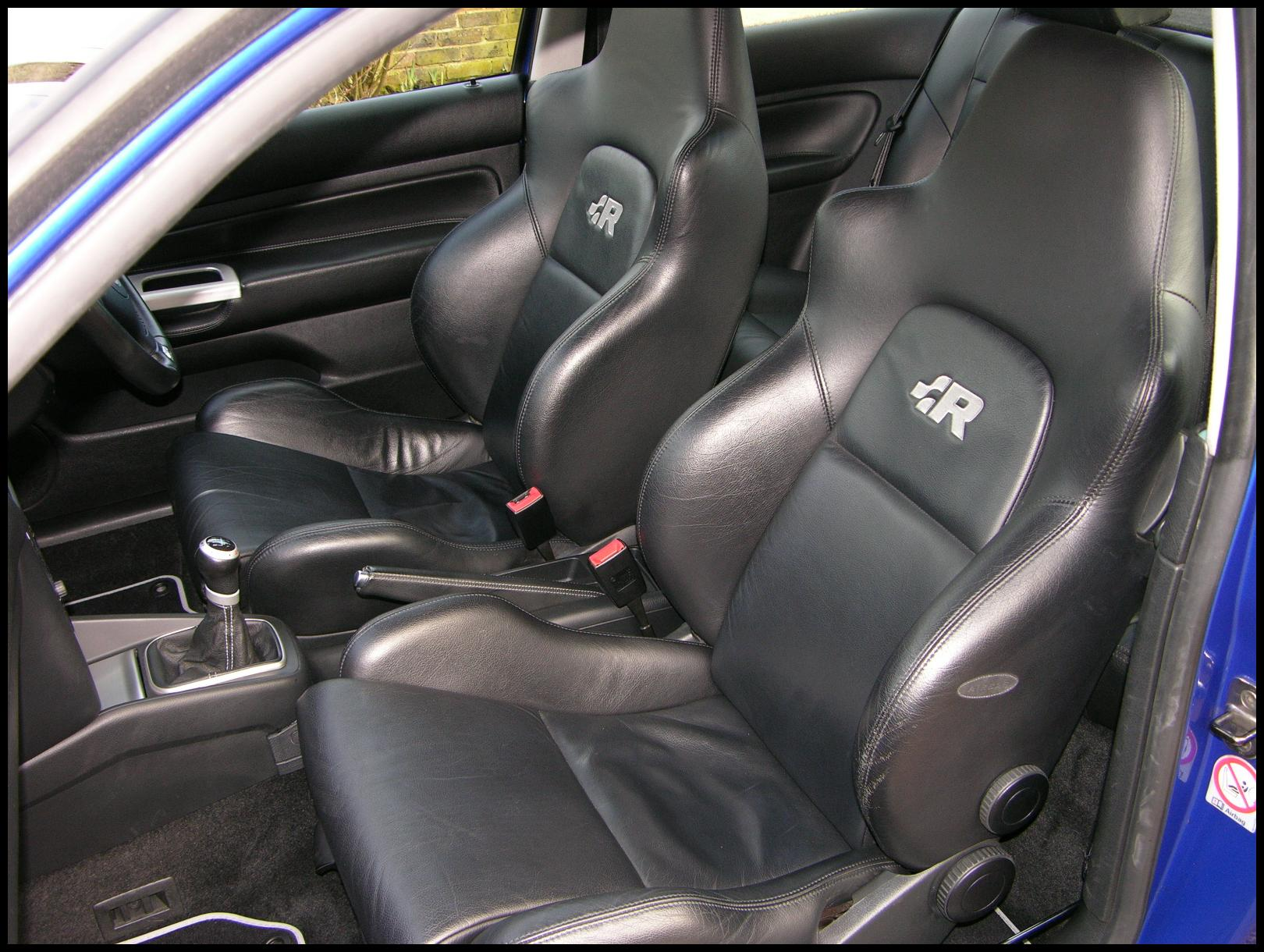
Volkswagen R32 interior

The R32 shared many mechanical components with the 3.2-litre Audi TT, including the 3,189 cc (3.2 L; 194.6 cu in) DOHC 24v VR6 engine (ID codes: BFH/BML), which produced 241 PS (238 bhp; 177 kW) at 6,250 rpm and 320 N⋅m (236 lb⋅ft) at 2,800 rpm. Further additions included Haldex Traction-based 4motion on-demand four-wheel drive system, a six-speed manual transmission, aluminum front control arms, independent rear suspension, and larger 334 mm (13.1 in) disc brakes with gloss blue painted calipers. Exterior changes included R32-specific bumpers and side skirts, a hatch spoiler, and 18" OZ Aristo alloy wheels (Ronal produced the wheels towards the end of production). The interior of the R32 was equipped with Climatronic automatic climate control, sport seats from König with R logo embroidery, a sunroof (US only), Xenon Headlamps (for Europe), and more.

For Australia, two hundred "Edition 200" cars were produced, each uniquely plaqued and available in three colours: Black Magic Pearl, Deep Blue Pearl and Reflex Silver.

For the US, Tornado Red was an available fourth colour. The distribution of US-spec R32 colours were:

- Deep Blue Pearl: 40%
- Reflex Silver: 35%
- Black Magic Pearl: 15%
- Tornado Red: 10%

For the US, five thousand cars were produced and intended to be sold over a two-year period. The allotment sold out in 13 months.

The R32 is capable of 0-100 km/h (62.1 mph) in 6.6 seconds, reduced to 6.4 seconds with the dual clutch gearbox, and can clear the quarter mile in 14.1 seconds at 99.2 mph (159.6 km/h).

== Extended production Mk4.5 ==
=== China ===
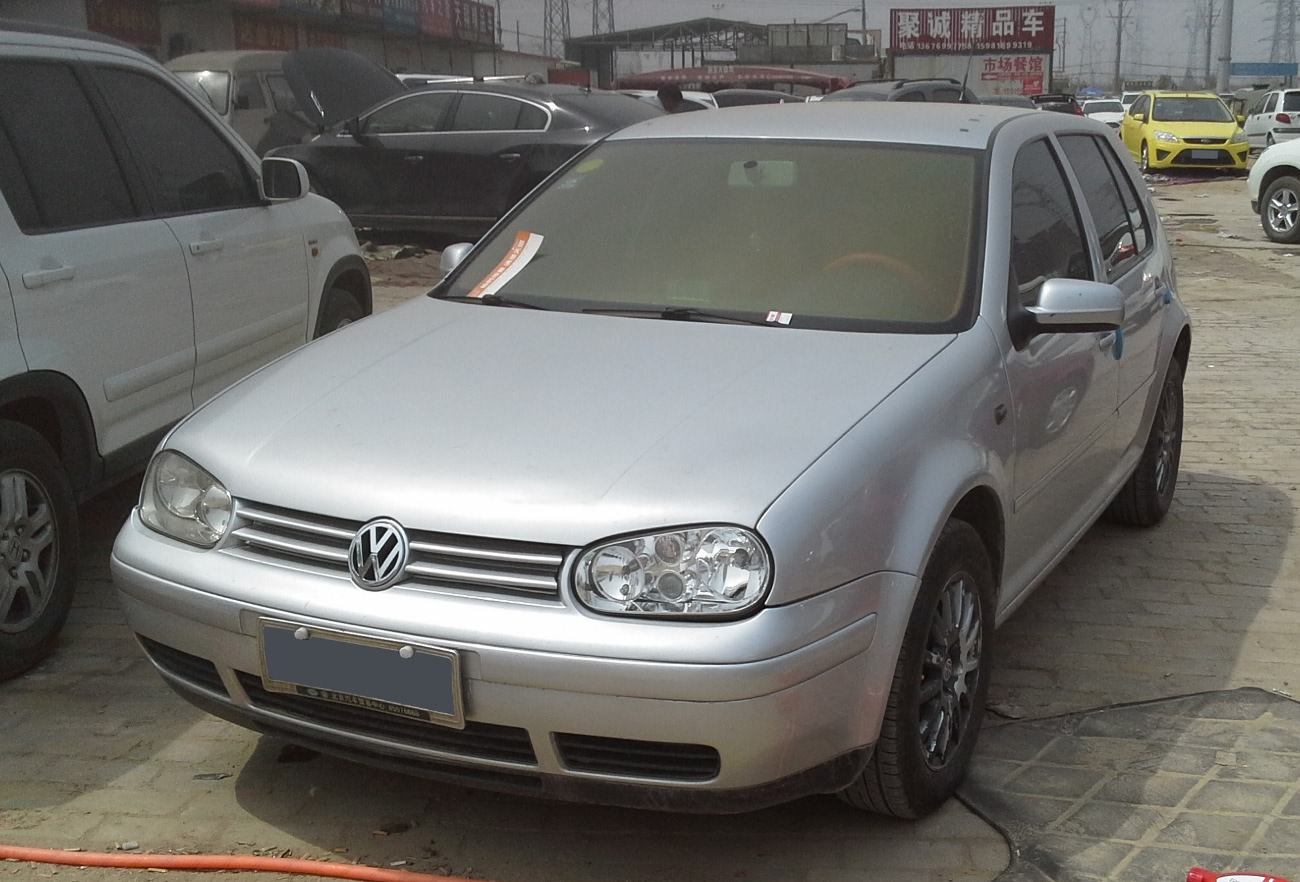

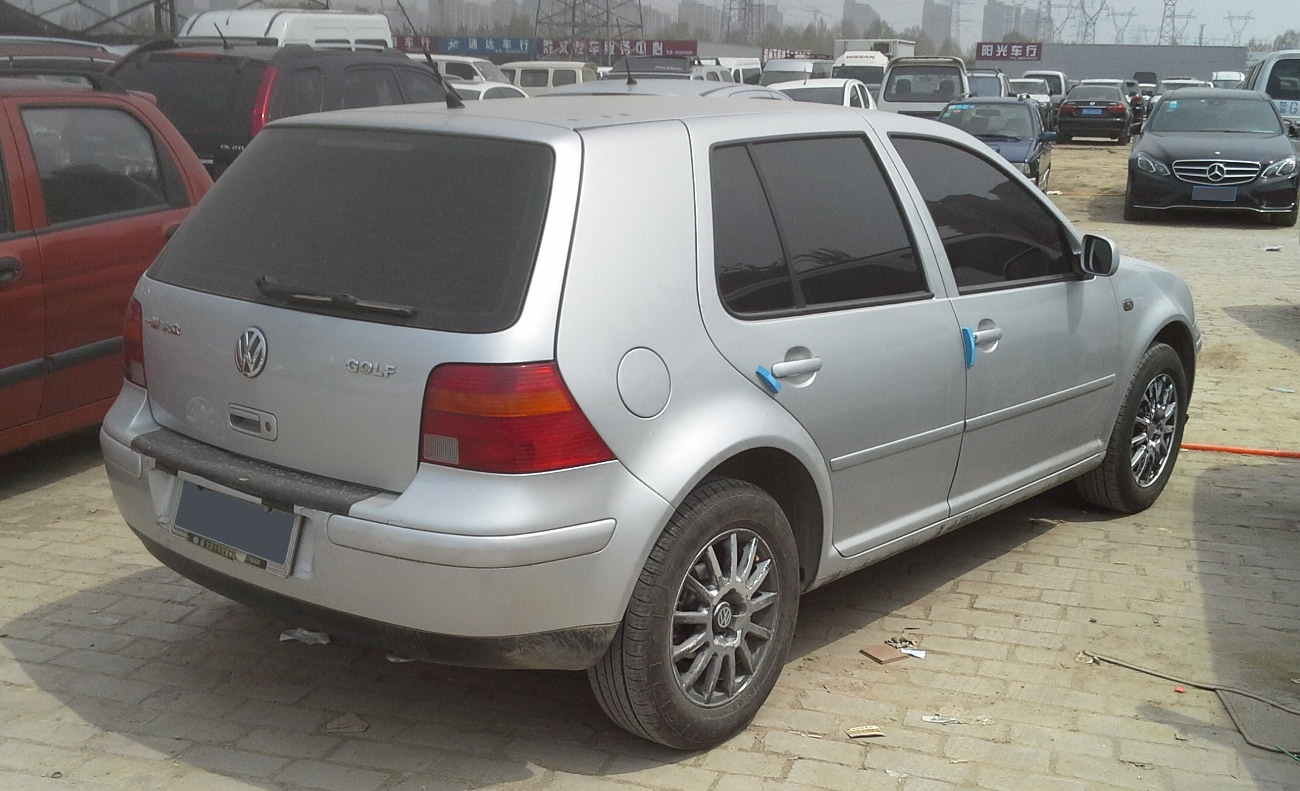
FAW-Volkswagen Golf Mk4

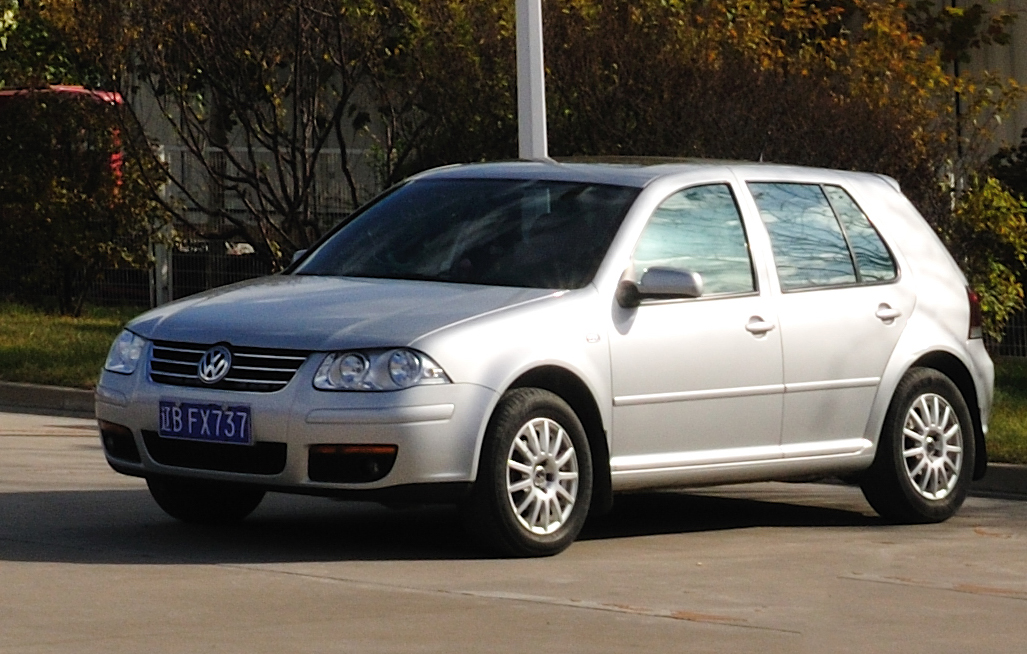

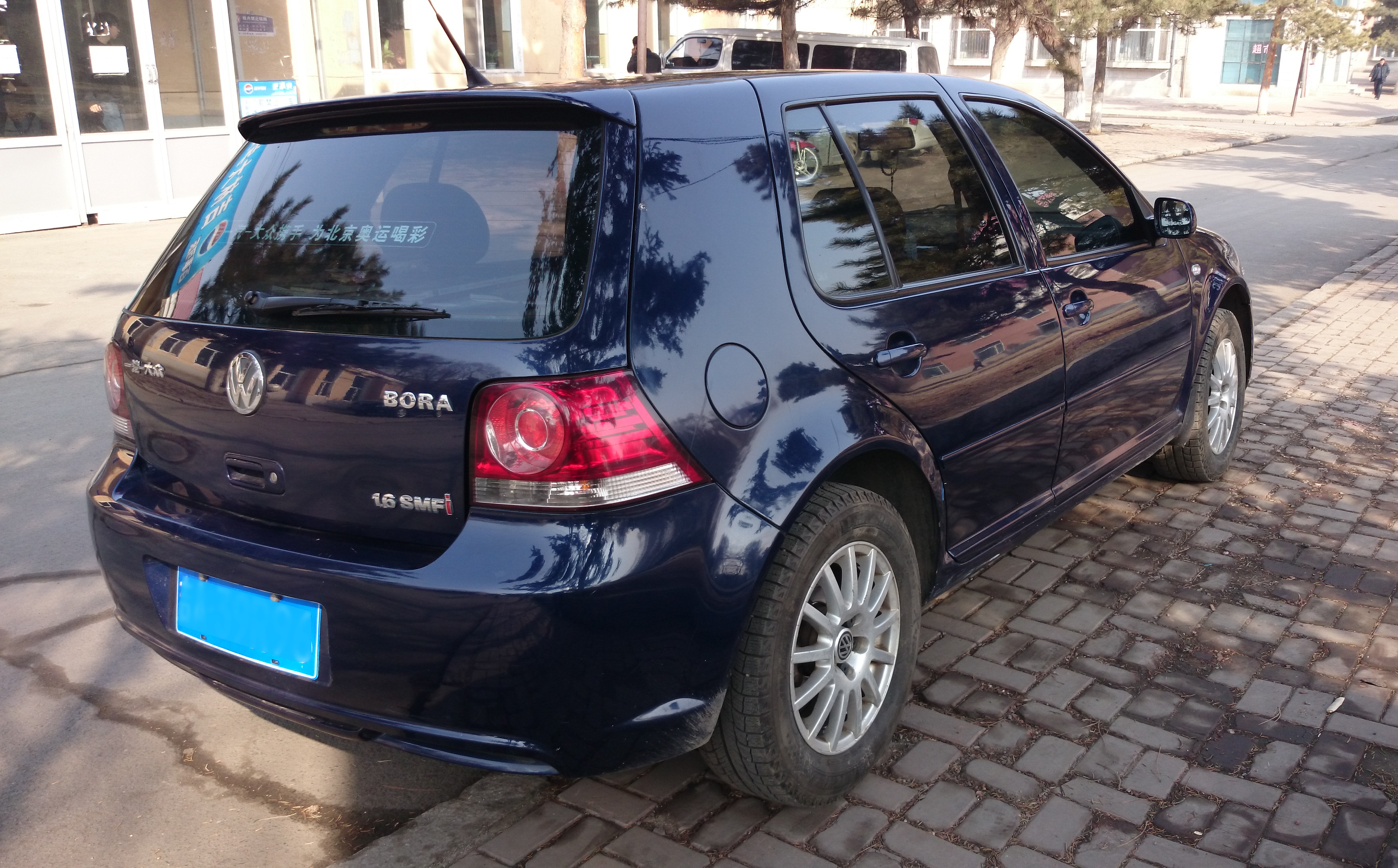
2006–2008 FAW Volkswagen Bora HS Mk4.5 (China)

In China, the Golf Mk4 commenced production in 2003 by FAW-Volkswagen, where it was sold alongside a new version of the Golf IV with FAW-VW's facelifted Bora front. It was shown at the Beijing International Automobile Exhibition in 2006 and was named as the Bora HS to complement the Bora Mk IV range and shared similar styling cues. The Mk4 Golf and Bora HS ended production in 2008 and 2009, respectively, where they were both succeeded by the Volkswagen Golf Mk6 for the 2010 model year. The Golf came standard with the 1.6 litre engine and 1.8 litre engine for the 2005 model year. The engines were paired to a 5-speed manual or 4-speed automatic gearbox as standard. Its Bora counterpart came standard with the same 1.6 litre engine and transmission options as the Golf. In comparison to pricing and trim levels, the 2004 Golf was priced from 116,000 to 139,000 yuan ($17,680 to $21,190 US – March 2021 exchange rate) and two trim levels available, known as Fashion and Charming. For the Bora HS, pricing ranged from 112,500 to 129,800 yuan ($17,150 to US$19,780 - March 2021 exchange rate) also with 2 trim levels known as Fashion and Luxury.

=== Americas ===
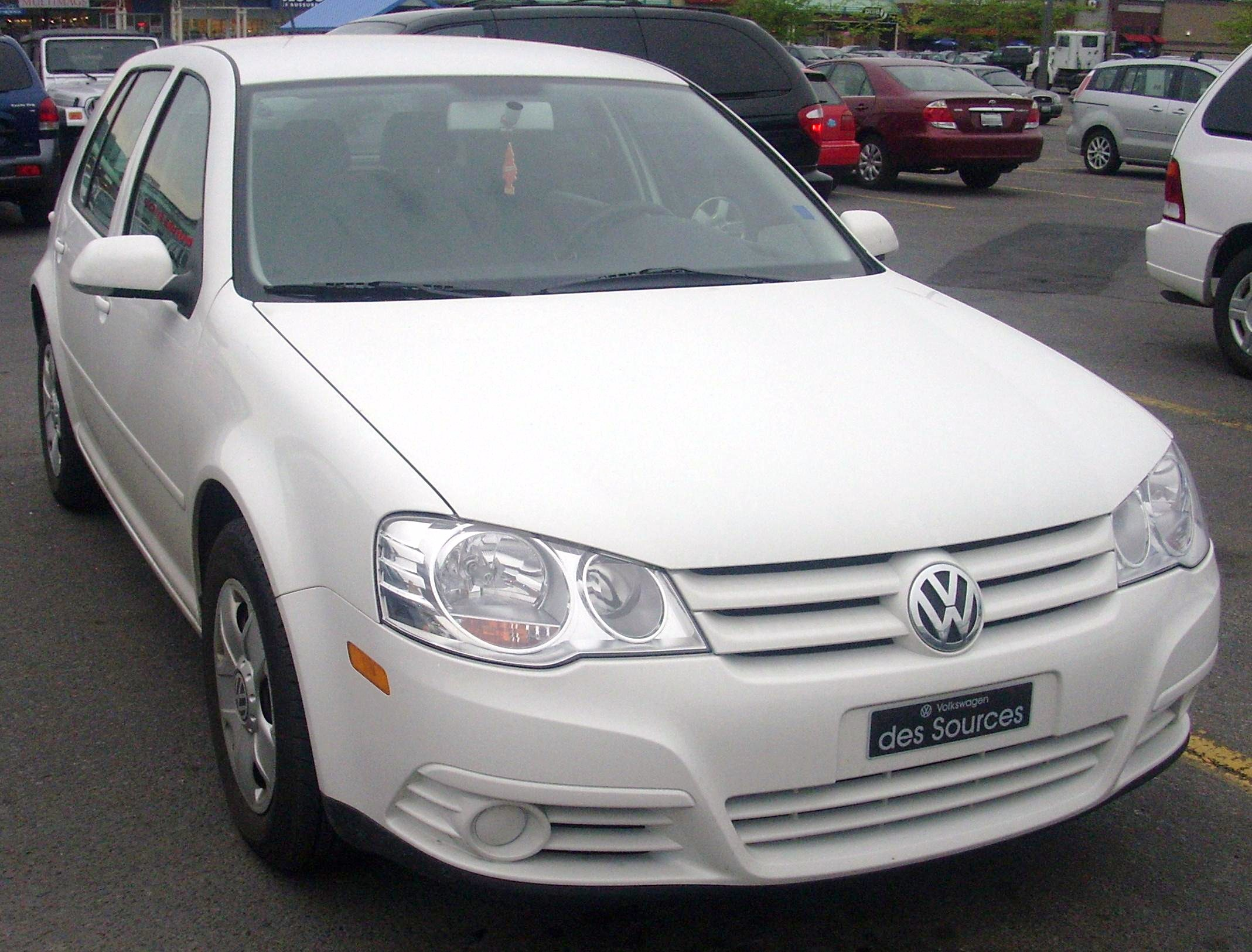

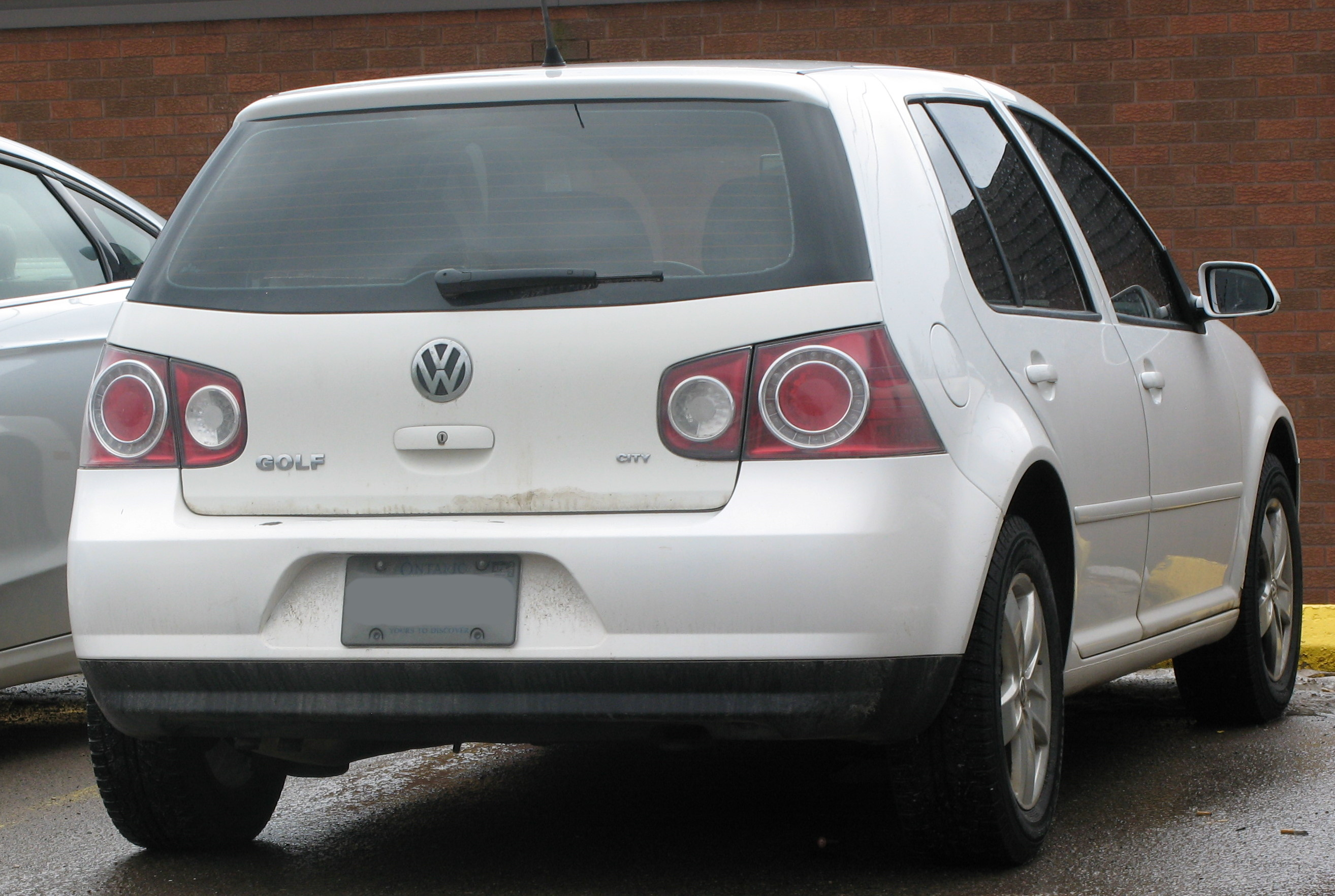
2008 Volkswagen City Golf Mk4.5 (Canada/Latin America)

The facelifted Golf Mk4 (nicknamed the Mk4.5) continued to be produced in Brazil until 2013. In Argentina, the range was available with a 1.6L or 2.0L petrol four-cylinder, a 1.8L turbocharged petrol four-cylinder, or with a 1.9L 130 bhp (97 kW) turbodiesel. In Chile, it was also sold until 2010, with a 1.6 to 2.0&L petrol range. All of these are Brazilian-built models, although the diesels are only for export markets.

In Brazil, the Mk4.5 Golf has a 1.6 L engine (with Volkswagen's Total Flex system, which accepts both gasoline and ethanol), or a 2.0 L engine (the 1.8 turbo engine was discontinued in 2009). It is available in two trim levels: the basic Sportline model with the 1.6 engine, and the 2.0 version with a Tiptronic 6-speed transmission.

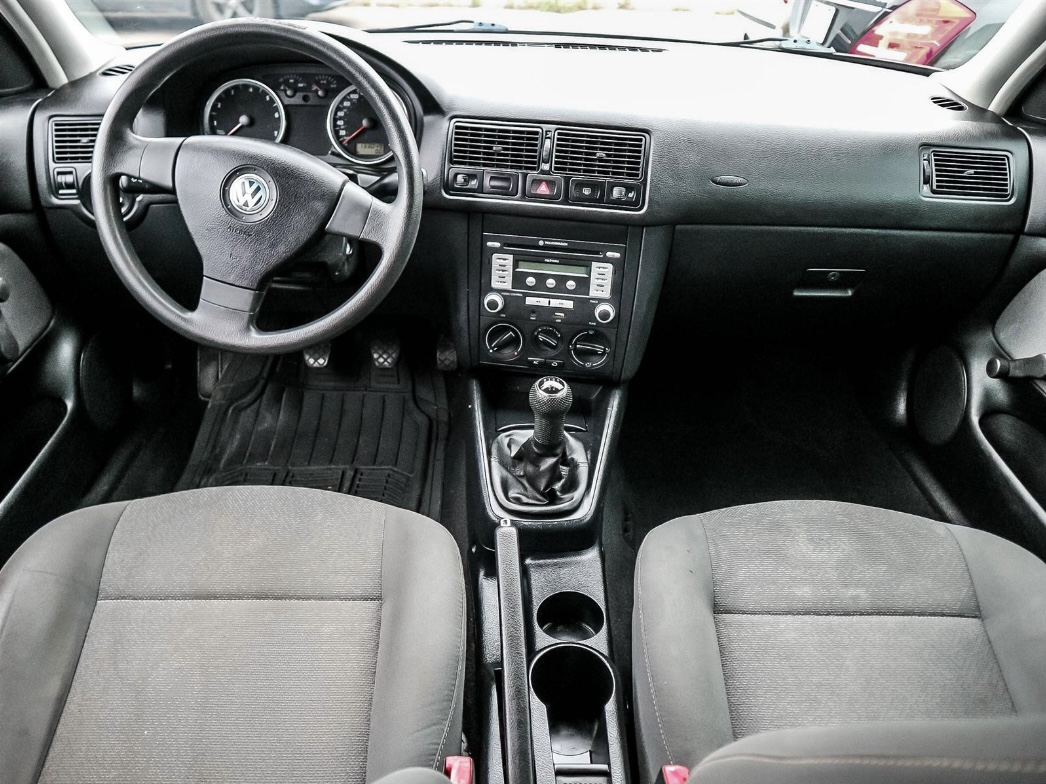
Volkswagen City Golf Mk4.5 interior

In 2007, Volkswagen Brazil introduced a major restyling of the fourth-generation Golf. The front takes styling cues from the current Volkswagen Polo and the back of the car is inspired by the Golf 5. It is exported in most Latin America countries, since it is produced in Brazil. It was also sold in Canada, where the Mk4.5 model (City Golf) was sold alongside the Mk5 model (badged as the Rabbit). This car was not sold in the United States. The lack of diesel models for the 2007 model year led Volkswagen Canada to continue sales of an entry-level car that was designed as an alternative to the TDI models for budget-minded shoppers. The Canadian model was originally rebadged as the City Golf, but in 2009, it was renamed the Golf City alongside the Jetta City. Pricing of the Golf City started at C$15,300 as of 2008. As an entry-level alternative to the Rabbit, it offered only one engine: the 2.0L SOHC 8 valve with 115 hp (86 kW). It was not related to the South African Volkswagen Citi Golf, despite the similarity in name. The Mk4.5 Jetta was similarly reintroduced in Canada for the 2007 model year as the City Jetta. Although the Golf City was dated, its attractive price enabled good sales. The Golf City was discontinued after the 2010 model year.

== Awards ==
- 2004 SEMA: Gran Turismo Award
- 2000 CAP Used Car of the Year Awards – Best Small Hatch
- 2000 Diesel Car 2000 Awards – Best Hatchback
- 1999 Used Car Buyer Greatest Used Buy Awards – Best Small Family Car
- 1998 What Car? Car of the Year Awards – Best Small Hatch
- 1998 Top Gear Magazine Top Cars – Best Family Car

== Engine choices ==
=== Golf and Jetta ===
Model	Year	Engine	Code	Displ.	Power	Torque
1.4	1998–2004	I4 16V	AHW/AXP/BCA/AKQ/APE/AUA	1390 cc	55 kW (75 PS; 74 hp) at 5,500 rpm	128 N⋅m (94 lb⋅ft) at 3,300 rpm
1.6	1998–2000	I4 8V	AEH/AKL/APF	1595 cc	74 kW (101 PS; 99 hp) at 5,600 rpm	145 N⋅m (107 lb⋅ft) at 3,800 rpm
1.6	2000–2006	I4 8V	AVU/BFQ	1595 cc	75 kW (102 PS; 101 hp) at 5,600 rpm	148 N⋅m (109 lb⋅ft) at 3,800 rpm
1.6	2000–2006	I4 16V	AUS/AZD/ATN/BCB	1598 cc	77 kW (105 PS; 103 hp) at 5,700 rpm	148 N⋅m (109 lb⋅ft) at 4,500 rpm
1.6 FSI	2002–2005	I4 16V	BAD	1598 cc	81 kW (110 PS; 109 hp) at 5,800 rpm	155 N⋅m (114 lb⋅ft) at 4,400 rpm
1.8	1998–2006	I4 20V	AGN/BAF	1781 cc	92 kW (125 PS; 123 hp) at 5,900 rpm	170 N⋅m (125 lbf⋅ft) at 3,500 rpm
1.8 T	1998-2001	I4 20V	AGU/ARX/ARZ/AUM/AWD/AWW/BAE	1781 cc	110 kW (150 PS; 148 hp) at 5,500 rpm	210 N⋅m (155 lb⋅ft) at 2,200–4,200 rpm
1.8 T	2001-2006	I4 20V	AUQ/AWP	1781 cc	132 kW (179 PS; 177 hp) at 5,500 rpm	235 N⋅m (173 lb⋅ft) at 1,950–4,700 rpm
2.0	1999–2001	I4 8V	AEG/APK/AQY	1984 cc	85 kW (115 PS; 113 hp) at 5,200 rpm	170 N⋅m (125 lb⋅ft) at 2,400 rpm
2.0	2001–2006	I4 8V	AZH/AZJ	1984 cc	85 kW (115 PS; 113 hp) at 5,400 rpm	172 N⋅m (127 lb⋅ft) at 3,200 rpm
2.3 VR5	1998–2000	VR5 10V	AGZ	2324 cc	110 kW (150 PS; 148 hp) at 6,000 rpm	205 N⋅m (151 lb⋅ft) at 3,200 rpm
2.3 VR5	2000–2003	VR5 20V	AQN	2324 cc	125 kW (170 PS; 168 hp) at 6,200 rpm	220 N⋅m (162 lbf⋅ft) at 3,300 rpm
2.8 VR6	1999–2002	VR6 12V	AAA/AFP	2792 cc	128 kW (174 PS; 172 hp) at 5,800 rpm	235 N⋅m (173 lb⋅ft) at 4,200 rpm
2.8 VR6	1999–2002.5	VR6 24V	AQP/AUE	2792 cc	150 kW (204 PS; 201 hp) at 6,000 rpm	270 N⋅m (199 lbf⋅ft) at 3,200 rpm
2.8 VR6	2002.5–2005	VR6 24V	BDF	2792 cc	150 kW (204 PS; 201 hp) at 6,000 rpm	270 N⋅m (199 lbf⋅ft) at 3,200 rpm
3.2 R32	2001–2004	VR6 24V	BJS/BML	3189 cc	177 kW (241 PS; 237 hp) at 6,250 rpm	320 N⋅m (236 lbf⋅ft) at 2,800 rpm
1.9 SDI	1998–2006	I4 8V	AGP/AQM	1896 cc	50 kW (68 PS; 67 hp) at 4,200 rpm	133 N⋅m (98 lb⋅ft) at 2,200–2,600 rpm
1.9 TDI	1998–2006	I4 8V	AGR/ALH	1896 cc	66 kW (90 PS; 89 hp) at 4,000 rpm	210 N⋅m (155 lbf⋅ft) at 1,900 rpm
1.9 TDI	2000–2006	I4 8V	ATD/AXR (Pumpe-Düse)	1896 cc	74 kW (101 PS; 99 hp) at 4,000 rpm	240 N⋅m (177 lbf⋅ft) at 1,800–2,400 rpm
1.9 TDI	1998–2002	I4 8V	AHF/ASV	1896 cc	81 kW (110 PS; 109 hp) at 4,150 rpm	235 N⋅m (173 lb⋅ft) at 1,900 rpm
1.9 TDI	1998–2000	I4 8V	AJM (Pumpe-Düse)	1896 cc	85 kW (115 PS; 113 hp) at 4,000 rpm	285 N⋅m (210 lb⋅ft) at 1,900 rpm
1.9 TDI	1999–2001	I4 8V	AUY (Pumpe-Düse)	1896 cc	85 kW (115 PS; 113 hp) at 4,000 rpm	310 N⋅m (229 lbf⋅ft) at 1,900 rpm
1.9 TDI	2001–2006	I4 8V	ASZ (Pumpe-Düse)	1896 cc	96 kW (130 PS; 128 hp) at 4,000 rpm	310 N⋅m (229 lbf⋅ft) at 1,900 rpm
1.9 TDI	2000–2003	I4 8V	ARL (Pumpe-Düse)	1896 cc	110 kW (150 PS; 148 hp) at 4,000 rpm	320 N⋅m (236 lbf⋅ft) at 1,900 rpm

=== Golf Cabriolet (Mk3 platform) ===
Model	Years	Engine and code		Displ.	Power	Torque
1.6	1998–2000	I4 8V	AFT/AKS	1595 cc	74 kW (101 PS; 99 hp) at 5,800 rpm	140 N⋅m (103 lbf⋅ft) at 3,500 rpm
1.8	1998–2000	I4 8V	AAM/ANN	1781 cc	55 kW (75 PS; 74 hp) at 5,000 rpm	140 N⋅m (103 lbf⋅ft) at 2,500 rpm
1.8	1998–2000	I4 8V	ADZ/ANP	1781 cc	66 kW (90 PS; 89 hp) at 5,500 rpm	145 N⋅m (107 lb⋅ft) at 2,500 rpm
2.0	1998–2000	I4 8V	AGG	1984 cc	85 kW (115 PS; 113 hp) at 5,400 rpm	166 N⋅m (122 lb⋅ft) at 2,600 rpm
2.0	2000–2002	I4 8V	AWG/AWF	1984 cc	85 kW (115 PS; 113 hp) at 5,400 rpm	165 N⋅m (122 lb⋅ft) at 3,200 rpm
2.0	1999–2002	I4 8V	ABA	1984 cc	85 kW (115 PS; 113 hp) at 5,400 rpm	165 N⋅m (122 lb⋅ft) at 3,200 rpm
1.9 TDI	1998–2002	I4 8V	ALE	1896 cc	66 kW (90 PS; 89 hp) at 3,750 rpm	210 N⋅m (155 lbf⋅ft) at 1,900 rpm

== Safety ==
ANCAP test results Volkswagen Golf 5 door hatch (2001)
Test	Score
Overall	4 /5 stars
Frontal offset	10.09/16
Side impact	14.69/16
Pole	Not Assessed
Seat belt reminders	0/3
Whiplash protection	Not Assessed
Pedestrian protection	Marginal
Electronic stability control	Not Assessed

== Pope Benedict XVI ==
In 1999, Joseph Cardinal Ratzinger, prefect of the Catholic Church's Congregation of the Doctrine of the Faith under Pope John Paul II, purchased a fourth-generation Golf in which to drive around Rome, selling it in 2005 after John Paul's death in anticipation of retiring and returning to Germany.

Instead, he became Pope Benedict XVI. Shortly after John Paul's death, his 1999 Golf sold to a German owner for $13,000, who then sold the car for around $244,000 via eBay to online betting company GoldenPalace.com.

== See also ==
- Hot hatch
- List of Volkswagen Group diesel engines
- List of Volkswagen Group petrol engines
- Compact car
- VDub
- Volkswagen Group A platform

Preceded by Volkswagen Golf Mk3	Volkswagen Golf Mk4; 1998–2014	Succeeded by Volkswagen Golf Mk5
