= Volkswagen 01M transmission =

Electronic/hydraulic four-speed transmission manufactured from 1995-2005

The Volkswagen 01M transmission is an electronic/hydraulic four-speed automatic transmission deployed in Cabrio, Jetta, Golf, GTI, New Beetle manufactured between 1995 through 2005, and transverse engine Passats manufactured between 1995 through 1997. This transmission was entirely engineered and most probably manufactured by the French company STA (owned by Renault) in Ruitz (Pas-de-Calais, France).

== Design ==
The 01M and its predecessor 096 are very similar to the other transmissions engineered and manufactured by STA: AR4, AD4 and AD8, which were deployed on Renault vehicles in the 1980s and 1990s. It is an electronically controlled transmission with a lockup torque converter, using planetary gears, clutch packs, and a gear-driven final drive with an open-differential. There is no chain inside this transmission. It does not have provision for a dipstick. It was determined that a dipstick and fill might invite owners to introduce incorrect or inferior fluid. More information on design and function can be found in VW's publications, mechanic's Self Study Programs SSP112 for early versions for the 92-94 096, or SSP172 for 01M from 95-06.

The 098 transmission later renamed as 01P is a variant of the same transmission. They are commonly found in Volkswagen Transporter (T4)/Eurovan

The 097 Audi transmissions used in longitudinal engine applications also used the same internals and similar valve bodies. These transmissions were later renamed 01N.

There existed a Tiptronic variation of the 01M transmission. They however came only on select Euro models.

The transmission has an oil-to-liquid cooler mounted on top of the transmission. Transmission oil is heated/cooled by the engine antifreeze that runs through the cooler.

== Weak points ==
Some areas of failure on this transmission include leaks in the oil filling tube by removing the cap incorrectly, damage to plastic internals due to fluid over-temperature conditions, leaks in the transmission oil cooler, internal fluid pressure leaks from torn piston diaphragms, worn piston bores for solenoids in aluminum valve body, and the resulting worn clutches and bands. Occasionally, the plastic speedometer drive gear will break and fall off of the differential carrier and the speedometer will stop working. To repair this, the transmission must be removed and the differential disassembled far enough to replace the plastic gear. With age, the resistance in the wiring and/or electrical terminals between the valve body and transmission controller can increase. The additional resistance may prevent the computer from reading the faint pulses from the transmission speed sensors. Any sulfated connector and missing sensor signal causes the transmission to go to "fail safe" or "limp" mode. This mode keeps the transmission in Third gear and the gear indicator in the instrument panel indicates all gears are selected simultaneously.

== Replacement ==
If replacing this transmission with a new or used transmission, pay special attention to the transmission code. The code is a three character code stamped in a pad just above the starter flange. This transmission was available in several gear ratios for different engines and vehicles, so it's important to get a transmission with the same code or another code known to be the same gear ratios. If the gear ratios are not the same the transmission controller will assume the transmission is slipping and go into fail safe mode.

== Rebuilding ==
The 01M transmission is a specialized transmission used only on Volkswagen vehicles, although very similar to the ones used on Renault vehicles. As a result, most local transmission shops or national chains won't have specific training, knowledge and equipment to test and re-machine vital parts of this transmission. This may result in several teardowns under warranty to get an acceptable result, if possible at all.

== Checking and filling oil levels ==
The correct fluid is a synthetic mineral oil, such as Pentosin ATF-1, Mercon V or Volkswagen G 052 162 A2. 3.750 liters is usually sufficient for a filter change. The transmission fluid is checked from underneath the vehicle while running and the transmission in park. This must be completed before the transmission fully warms up (35-38°C). Once running, the drain plug on the bottom of the transmission oil pan is removed with a 5mm allen wrench. Some fluid will drip out whether oil level is full or low. There is a plastic stack in the hole, similar to a chimney, which keeps all the fluid from running out. This stack maintains the proper level at the proper temperature. If the fluid is "glugging" or just barely running out the bottom hole when the temperature of the transmission is in the range of 95F-113F, no further action is needed. Reinstall drain plug and put fill cap back on. If no fluid comes out, fill the transmission with specified fluid a little at a time until fluid is observed "glugging" or just barely running out the hole in the bottom. No further action is needed. Install drain plug and fill tube cap.

This transmission has a separate oil for the differential in the transmission, so there are two fluid levels to check. The differential fluid is checked by unscrewing the speed sensor gear assembly and use it as a dipstick. The speed sensor gear assembly is located on top of the transmission just above the right inner CV joint. Differential is emptied by removing the final drive cover on the rear of the transmission or by vacuum extraction through the speed sensor hole. Vacuum extraction is the more attractive option since a paper gasket seals the steel cover and access is very difficult. Filling is through the speed sensor hole. Differential oil capacity is about 1 liter. An acceptable differential oil is Redline synthetic MT-90 75W90 gear oil or any synthetic 75W90 GL4 gear oil. Be very careful not to introduce sand or dust into the differential, as the differential has no way to filter its oil.

== Transmission controller ==
The shifting of this transmission is controlled by the Transmission Control Module, or TCM. There are three shift modes that the transmission can be set to which alters the shift points as well as the speed of the shifts (amount of transmission slip between shifts). Factory Mode, Economy/Touring Mode and Sport Mode. Economy mode endeavors to keep the engine revolutions lower to save fuel, while Sport mode allows the engine to rev higher before shifts, as well as shift faster with a sacrifice to economy. Changing these modes require transmission programming through a factory scan tool.

This computer uses "fuzzy logic" to learn the driving habits of the driver in order to set its specific shift points. If two or more drivers with different driving styles have been driving the car, the TCM may become "confused" and start acting goofy. Such goofy behavior may manifest in hard shifting, slipping, trouble getting in gear at idle, etc.

A quick fix is to reset the "fuzzy logic" by performing the following: Sitting in the driver's seat turn the ignition on without starting the car. Immediately put the accelerator to the floor. Count to five seconds. Release the pedal. Turn the key off then immediately start the engine.

If your problem is from a confused TCM, this will solve the problem. This will not reset trouble codes in the computer. That must be done with the proper OBDII scan tool such as the VAG 5052, VAG COM tool at the VW dealer.

The transmission computer is located under the back seat on Volkswagen Golf Mk3 /Jetta/Passat models, under the right side dashboard cover on Volkswagen New Beetle models, and in the wiper area plenum on other Volkswagen Golf Mk4/Jetta models.

== Predecessors ==
Before the 01M transmission, VW used the 096 four-speed for Mk3 Golf/Jetta cars from 1992-1994. These cars will have a SPORT/ECONOMY switch near the shifter or on the dashboard to alter the shift points.

But the original ancestor was the AR4 transmission, deployed on Renault vehicles with longitudinal engines (4 and 6 cylinders) in the 1980s : R25, R21 and Espace. Two different versions for transverse engines were developed in the early 1990s : AD4 for 4 cylinders (Renault Clio, Mégane, Laguna, Safrane) and AD8 for 6 cylinders (Renault Laguna, Safrane). Both 096 and 01M VW transmissions are similar to the AD4, and many parts are interchangeable.

Some of the 096 parts were held over for the 01M transmission, such as oil filter, oil pan, filler tube, gaskets, speedometer gears, skid plate, etc. These transmissions have different torque converters and other internal parts that are not interchangeable.

== Successor ==
The 01M production ended with the last of the Mk4 body style Golf in 2006. It was succeeded by the Jatco JF506E transmission designed 5-speed automatic (09A) Tiptronic, and later an Aisin 6-speed automatic (09G) Tiptronic transmission in New Beetle Convertibles, as well as a Direct-Shift Gearbox (DSG) based dual clutch transmission in recent models of the above cars. The DSG does not have a torque converter, and is more akin to a pair of manual transmissions within a single housing.
