= VR5 engine =

VR5

Overview
- Manufacturer: Volkswagen
- Also called: staggered five
- Production: 1997 to 2006

Layout
- Configuration: VR5
- Displacement: 2,324 cc
- Cylinder bore: 81.0mm
- Piston stroke: 90.2mm
- Cylinder block material: Grey cast iron
- Cylinder head material: Cast aluminium alloy
- Valvetrain: 10 valve (AGZ) or 20 valve with variable valve timing (AQN/AZX), one direct acting cam per cylinder bank
- Compression ratio: 10:1 (AGZ) or 10.8:1 (AQN/AZX)

RPM range
- Max. engine speed: 6500 RPM

Combustion
- Fuel system: Common rail multi-point electronic sequential indirect fuel injection with five intake manifold-sited fuel injectors
- Management: Bosch Motronic M3.8.3 (AGZ), Bosch Motronic ME7.1 (AQN/AZX)
- Fuel type: Petrol
- Oil system: Wet sump

Output
- Power output: 150 PS (AGZ) to 170 PS (AQN/AZX)
- Torque output: 209 N⋅m (AGZ) to 220 N⋅m (AQN/AZX)

Emissions
- Emissions control systems: Three-way catalytic converter with lambda control and exhaust secondary air injection

Chronology
- Predecessor: None
- Successor: None

The VR5 engine is a five-cylinder piston engine configuration developed by Volkswagen and produced from 1997 to 2006. The VR5 design is derived from the six-cylinder VR6, also developed by Volkswagen, but with the first cylinder removed. The VR5 is highly compact, with a narrow included angle of 15° and displacement of 2,324 cc (2.3 L; 141.8 cu in). This engine was referred to in some Volkswagen marketing materials as a V5, but this designation can also refer to a related configuration with two separate banks of cylinders, each with their own cylinder head.

== Technical information ==
A VR5 engine block houses two staggered rows of cylinders within a single, short and wide bank – one row of two cylinders and one row of three. This narrow-angle, single-bank block makes the five cylinder engine as short as an inline three cylinder, while also having only one inlet and exhaust manifold. In a transverse layout, the three-cylinder row faces towards the front; in a longitudinal layout, it faces towards the right. Due to the narrow included angle of the two cylinder rows, the arrangement is similar to a staggered, W-patterned inline five-cylinder. The cylinders have a firing order of 1-2-4-5-3.

The VR5 was initially made with two valves per cylinder as the AGZ engine from 1997 until 2000, resulting in a 10 valve engine producing 150 PS (110 kW; 148 hp) at 6000 RPM and 209 N⋅m (154 lb⋅ft) of torque at 3200 RPM. The engine was updated in 2000 as the AQN/AZX engine, with four valves per cylinder and variable valve timing, producing 170 PS (125 kW; 168 hp) at 6200 RPM and 220 N⋅m (162 lb⋅ft) at 3300 RPM. Both versions of the engine had cast aluminium alloy cylinder heads and cast iron cylinder blocks.

=== Valvetrain and cylinder head ===
The AGZ had 10 valves in total with 2 unequal sized valves per cylinder and chain driven camshafts. When this was updated the AQN/AZX engine had 20 valves in total, with 4 unequal sized valves per cylinder.

Due to the use of a single cylinder head, a key design principle of the VR engines, exhaust and intake ports were of unequal length between the two cylinder banks. To mitigate this, Volkswagen used unequally sized valves to ensure even flow and power output from the cylinders.

=== Engine block and pistons ===
The AGZ engine used a cast iron cylinder block with five staggered cylinders. Each cylinder was 81.0 mm × 90.2 mm (3.19 in × 3.55 in) bore x stroke, resulting in 464.8 cc (28.4 cu in) per cylinder with a 0.90:1 stroke ratio creating an undersquare/long stroke engine. The top of each piston was angled to accommodate for the use of the 15° narrow V angle.

=== Aspiration, fuel system, and engine management ===
The AGZ engine was managed by a Bosch Motronic M3.8.3 engine management system and the AQN/AZX engine by a Bosch Motronic ME7.1 engine management system. The engine used multi-point common rail sequential fuel injection, with fuel injected indirectly into the lower inlet manifold section just before the cylinder head intake ports. Fuel and air delivery was controlled by a cable operated throttle body, with a potentiometer monitoring throttle position and allowing the Motronic ECU to deliver the correct amount of fuel. The engine also had a vacuum actuated variable intake manifold, controlled by the ECU via a valve part of the engines vacuum system. The valve is opened and closed depending on engine load, engine speed and throttle position. This allows the engine to take advantage of pressure waves created by the intake valves opening and closing.

== Applications ==
VR5 Engine Versions
| Engine Code | Production | Displacement | Power (PS) | Torque | Compression ratio |
|---|---|---|---|---|---|
| AGZ | 1997–2000 | 2324 cc | 150 @ 6000 RPM | 209 N⋅m (154 lb⋅ft) @ 3200 RPM | 10:1 |
| AQN/AZX | 2000–2006 | 2324 cc | 170 @ 6200 RPM | 220 N⋅m (162 lb⋅ft) @ 3300 RPM | 10.8:1 |

The VR5 was used in the Volkswagen Golf Mk4, Bora, New Beetle and Passat B5. The engine was also included in the Seat Toledo Mk2, a saloon car made by Volkswagen Group's subsidiary SEAT.
