= Jatco JF506E transmission =

5-speed automatic from 1996

The Jatco JF506E/F5A5 transmission is an electronic/hydraulic five-speed automatic transmission for passenger cars and deployed in a variety of cars from Jaguar, Rover, Land Rover, Ford, Mazda, Mitsubishi, Volkswagen and SEAT. This gearbox is known as 09A/09B on Volkswagen vehicles.

== Gear ratios ==
| 1 | 2 | 3 | 4 | 5 | R |
|---|---|---|---|---|---|
| 3.801–4.130 | 2.131–2.233 | 1.364 | 0.935 | 0.685 | 2.970 |

== Applications ==
- 2002–2003 Mitsubishi Lancer Evolution VII GT-A
- 2005–2007 Mitsubishi Lancer Evolution IX Wagon GT-A
- Volkswagen Golf Mk4, succeeded by the Direct-Shift Gearbox (DSG) based dual clutch transmission on the Golf R32
- Volkswagen Jetta/Bora Mk4, with 1.8T, VR5, VR6 and TDI Pump-Duse engines. Final drive ratios: 4.17(gasoline) and 3.48 (TDI)
- Volkswagen Sharan Mk I
- Land Rover Freelander Mk I
- 2001–2009 Jaguar X-Type
- 2000–2006 Ford Mondeo Mk III
- Ford Galaxy Mk I & Mk II
- 1999–2006 Mazda MPV
- 1996–2003 Audi A3 Mk I
- 1999–2005 Rover 75

== See also ==
- List of Jatco transmissions
