= Mindset (disambiguation) =

A mindset is a set of assumptions, methods or notions held by one or more people.

Mindset may also refer to:

- Mindset (book), 2006, Carol Dweck, cognitive science
- Mindset (computer), a 1980s personal computer
- Mindset (Transformers), a fictional character
- Mindset (vehicle), a plug-in hybrid
- Mindset (album), a 2011 album by The Necks
- Mind-set, a 2022 film
