= Volkswagen Golf Mk5 =

Fifth generation of Golf compact car

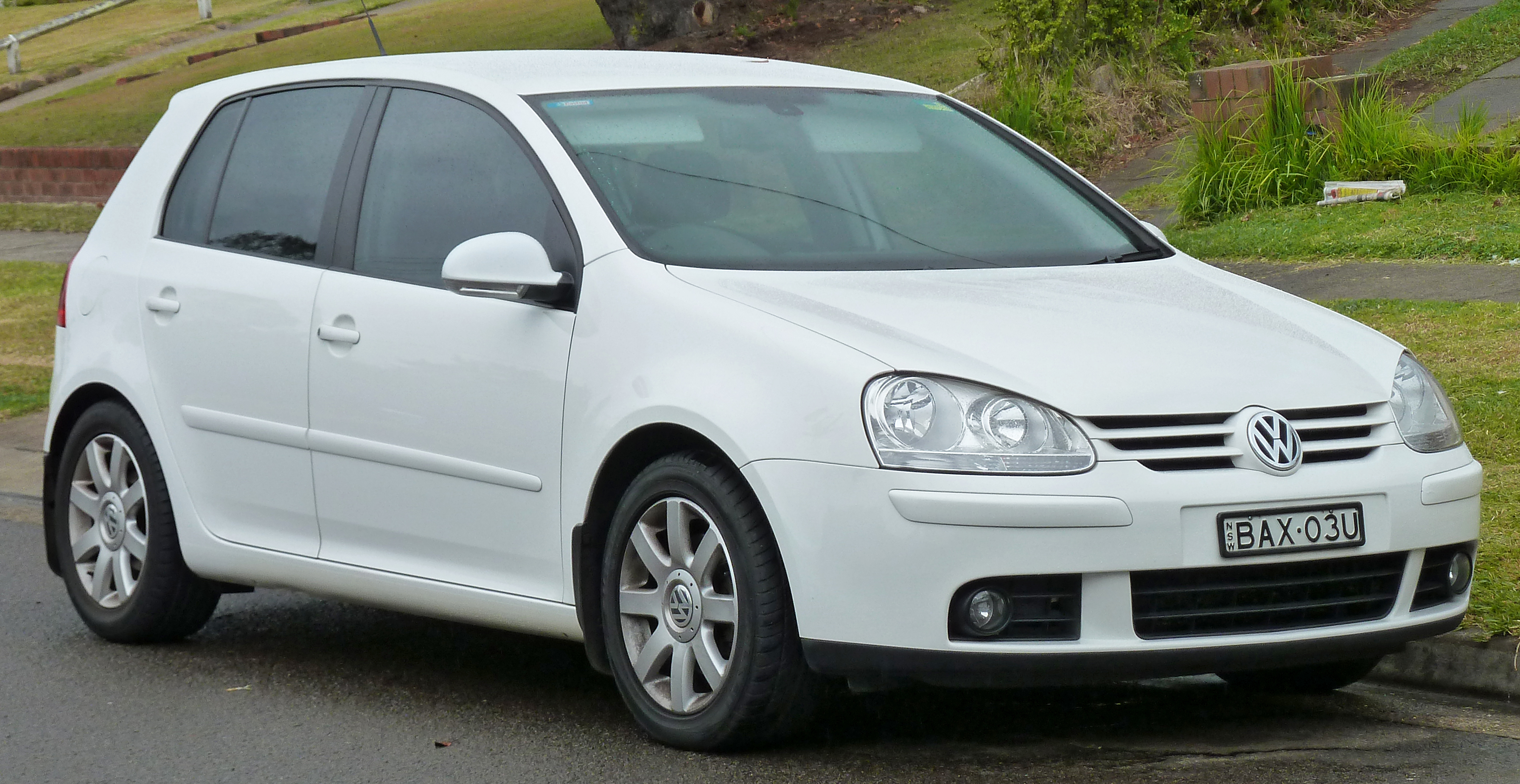

Overview
- Manufacturer: Volkswagen
- Model code: 1K
- Also called: Volkswagen Rabbit (US and Canada); Volkswagen GTI (US and Canada); Volkswagen Jetta SportWagen (North America, wagon); Volkswagen Vento Variant (Argentina and Uruguay, wagon)
- Production: August 2003 – 2009; April 2007–2009 (wagon)
- Assembly: Germany: Wolfsburg; South Africa: Uitenhage; Belgium: Brussels (Audi Brussels); Mexico: Puebla (wagon only); Ukraine: Solomonovo (Eurocar); Indonesia: Jakarta (National Assemblers)
- Designer: Hartmut Warkuss, Peter Schreyer and Marc Lichte (hatchback); Murat Günak (estate)

Body and chassis
- Class: Small family car (C)
- Body style: 3-door hatchback; 5-door hatchback; 5-door estate/wagon
- Layout: Front-engine, front-wheel-drive Front-engine, all-wheel-drive (4Motion); Mid-engine, rear-wheel-drive (W12-650)
- Platform: Volkswagen Group A5 (PQ35)
- Related: Volkswagen Golf Plus; Volkswagen Touran Mk1; Volkswagen Jetta Mk5; Volkswagen Eos; Škoda Octavia Mk2; SEAT Altea; SEAT Toledo Mk3; SEAT León Mk2; Audi A3 Mk2; Audi TT Mk2

Powertrain
- Engine: Petrol: 1.4 L BCA/BUD I4; 1.4 L BKG/BLN FSI I4; 1.4 L BLG/BMY/CAVD/CAXA TSI I4; 1.6 L BGU/BSE/BSF 8-valve I4; 1.6 L BAG/BLF/BLP FSI I4; 2.0 L AXW/BLR/BLX/BVY/BVX FSI I4; 2.0 L AXX/BWA/BPY/BYD/CAWB Turbo FSI I4; 2.5 L BGP/BGQ I5; 3.2 L BUB VR6 (R32); Diesel: 1.9 L BRU/BXF/BXJ/BJB/BKC/BXE/BLS TDI PD I4; 2.0 L BDK SDI I4; 2.0 L AZV/BKD/BMM/BMN/CBDB PD/CR TDI I4
- Transmission: 5-speed manual; 6-speed manual; 6-speed Aisin TF60SN (09G) tiptronic automatic; 6-speed DSG dual-clutch automatic; 7-speed DSG

Dimensions
- Wheelbase: 2,578 mm (101.5 in)
- Length: 4,204–4,246 mm (165.5–167.2 in) (hatchback); 4,556 mm (179.4 in) (wagon)
- Width: 1,759 mm (69.3 in) (hatchback); 1,781 mm (70.1 in) (wagon)
- Height: 1,465–1,479 mm (57.7–58.2 in) (hatchback); 1,504 mm (59.2 in) (wagon)
- Kerb weight: 1,164–1,617 kg (2,566–3,565 lb)

Chronology
- Predecessor: Volkswagen Golf Mk4
- Successor: Volkswagen Golf Mk6

The Volkswagen Golf Mk5 (codenamed Typ 1K) is a compact car/small family car manufactured and marketed by Volkswagen, as the fifth generation of the Golf in three- or five-door hatchback (August 2003 – 2008) and a five-door station wagon (2007–2009) configurations, as well as the successor to the Golf Mk4. Using the Volkswagen Group A5 (PQ35) platform, the Mk5 debuted at the Frankfurt Motor Show in October 2003 and went on sale in Europe for the 2004 model year. Although the Golf Mk5 was marketed as the Volkswagen Rabbit in the United States and Canada, the GTI model in those countries was marketed instead as the Volkswagen GTI.

The Golf Mk5 was replaced in 2009 by the Golf Mk6, which was built on the same platform.

== Features ==
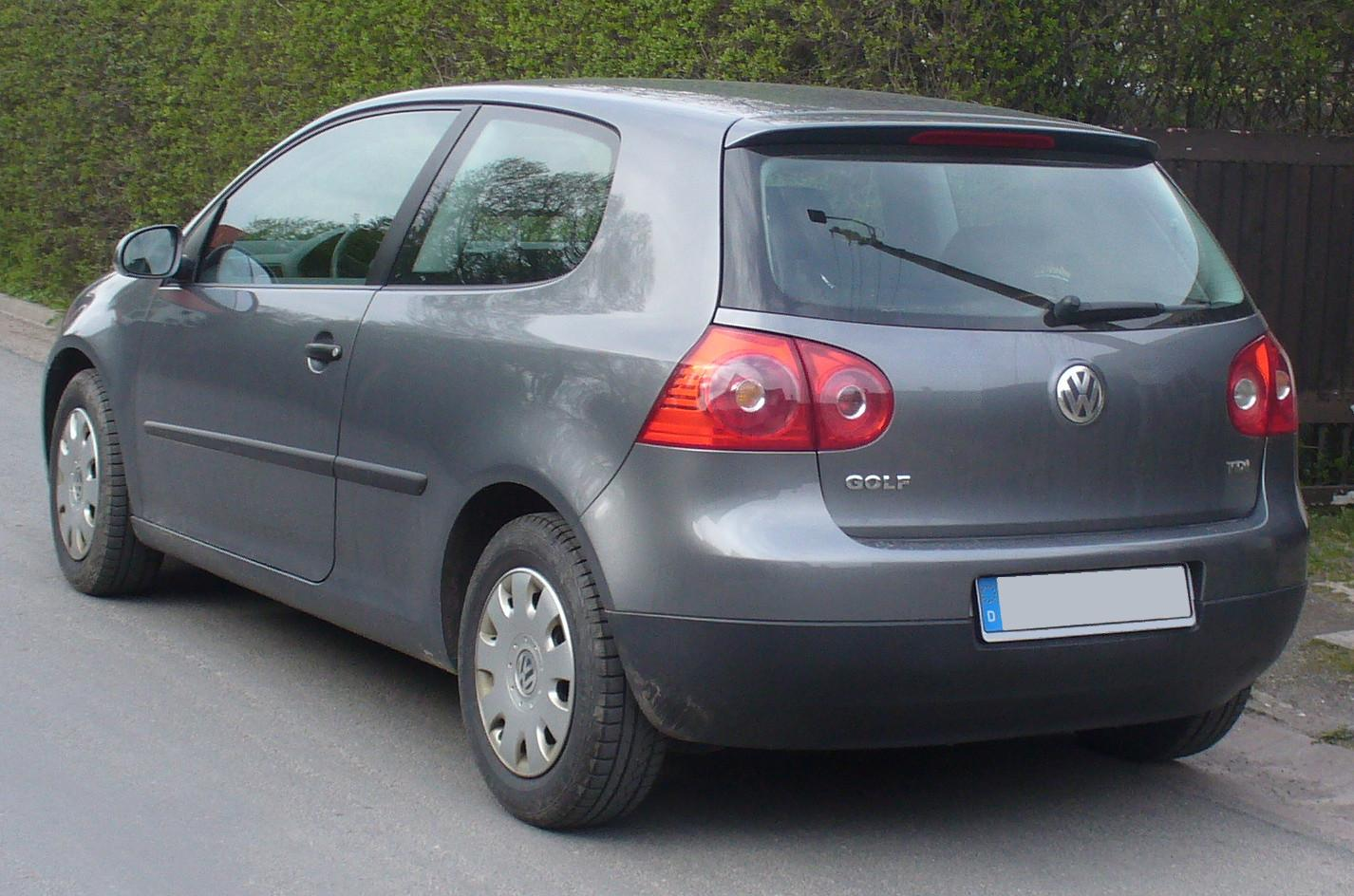
3-door

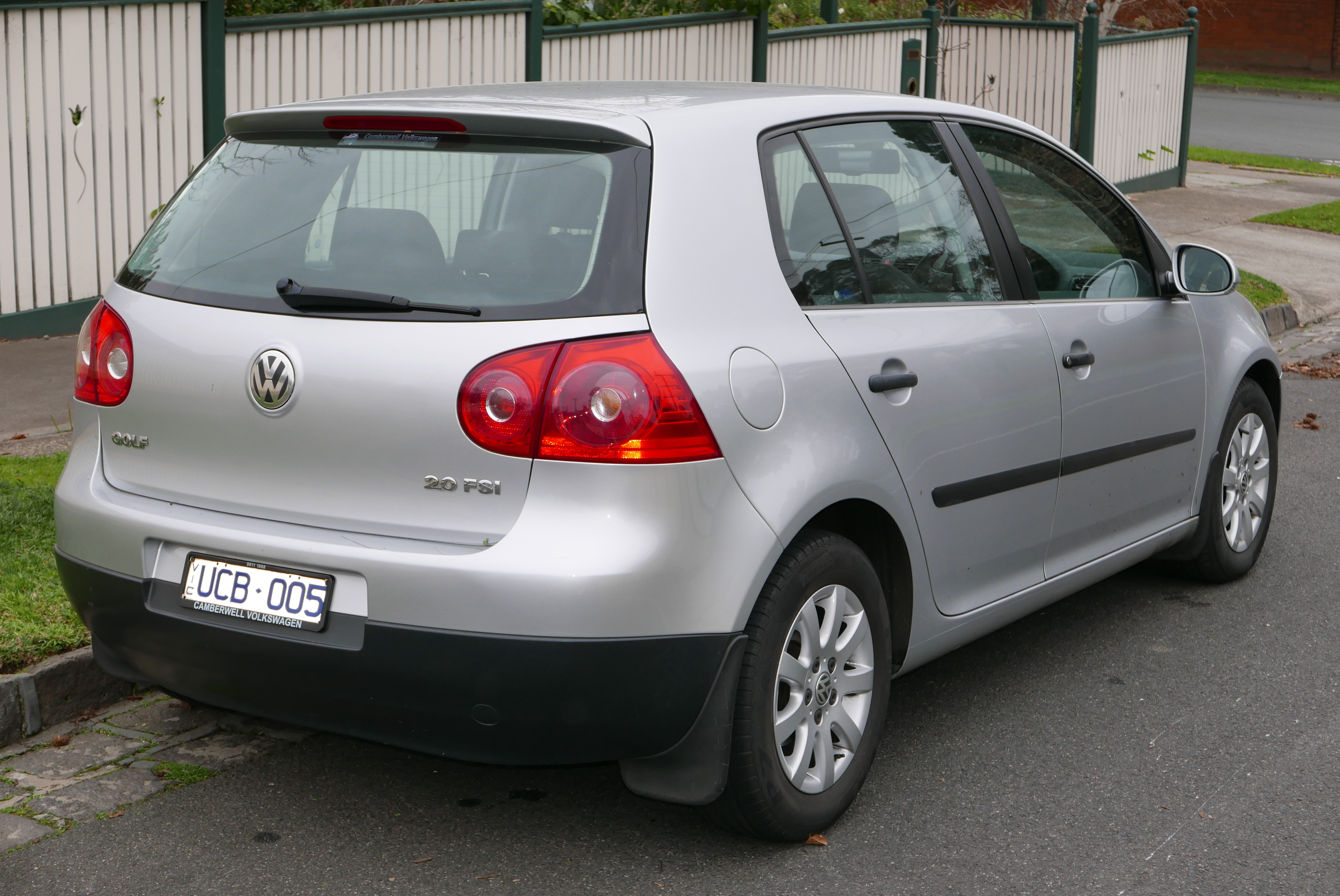
5-door

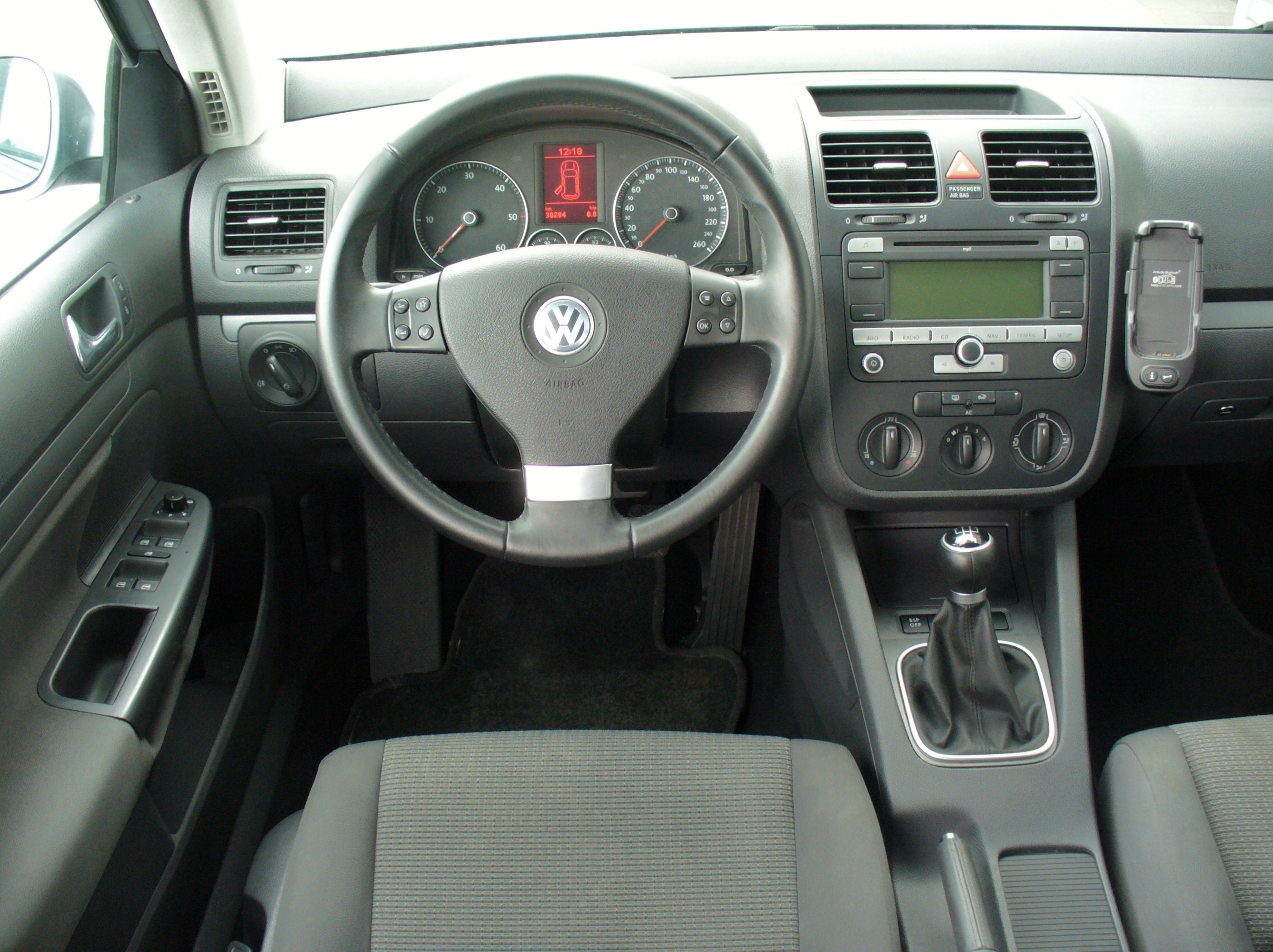
Interior

=== Design ===
The Mk5 had revised suspension changes and chassis tuning and increased cargo volume, corresponding to a minor increase in size over the outgoing model. Its cargo volume is roughly 0.7 cubic feet (20 L) greater.

It has a 0.32 drag coefficient.

Its replacement, the Mk6, was moved forward from the previously stated 2009 in Europe to the autumn of 2008, right after its official premiere at the Paris Motor Show in September 2008.

=== Powertrain ===
Options for engines and transmissions vary from country to country, but the Golf Mk5 is available with 4-cylinder, 5-cylinder, and 6-cylinder petrol engines, and a new Pumpe Duse unit injector Turbocharged Direct Injection (TDI) diesel engine. Transmission options include manual, automatic, Tiptronic, and Direct-Shift Gearbox (DSG).

The Golf GTI included a 2.0-litre Turbocharged Fuel Stratified Injection (FSI) engine rated 200 PS (147 kW; 197 bhp) at 5100–6000 rpm (240 PS [177 kW; 237 bhp] automatic) and 280 N⋅m (207 lb⋅ft) torque at 1700–5000 rpm. Transmissions include a 6-speed manual or 6-speed DSG.

In September 2005, the Golf Mk5 GT was announced, which featured a choice of either 1.4 L petrol engine in twincharger (TSI) configuration, or a 2.0 litre TDI. Both are available as 125 kW (170 PS; 168 bhp) versions; while the diesel also is available as a 140 PS (103 kW; 138 bhp) variant in the UK. The 170 PS (125 kW; 168 hp) diesel has 350 N⋅m (258 lbf⋅ft) of torque, which is more than the range topping R32.

The new Twincharger (TSI) petrol engine uses Fuel Stratified Injection (FSI), along with a pair of chargers forcing the induction of the air. The chargers are a single supercharger that disengages after a specified rev-range, at which point charging of the air is handled by a single turbocharger. This system benefits from the pumping efficiency of the supercharger at lower revs and the fuel efficiency of the turbocharger at high revs. This results in more constant power delivery through the rev range, and better fuel efficiency. Both petrol and diesel versions are also available with DSG (Direct-Shift Gearbox). Performance figures for the petrol vehicle are 0-100 km/h (62 mph) in 6.9 seconds (6 speed) and 6.9 seconds (DSG), with the diesel taking 8.2 seconds, and both reaching top speed of 220 km/h (136.7 mph).

==== US and Canada ====
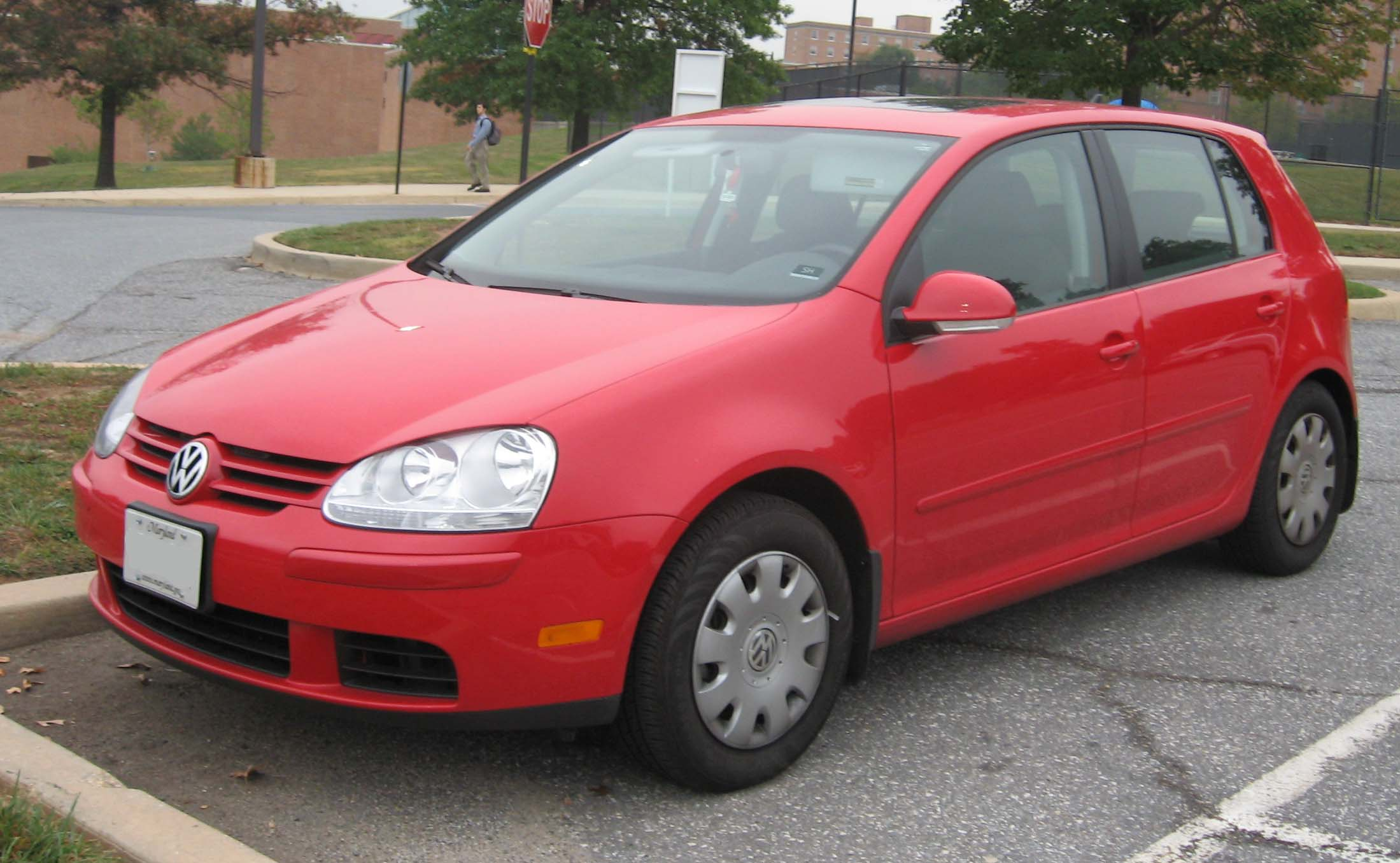
Volkswagen Rabbit (US and Canada)

United States and Canada base specification Rabbits use the same 2.5-litre five-cylinder gasoline engine that powers the Jetta and New Beetle in these markets, making 150 hp (112 kW) and 170 lb⋅ft (230 N⋅m) in 2006–2007 models, and 170 hp (127 kW) and 177 lb⋅ft (240 N⋅m) from 2008 onward. North American transmission choices include a 5-speed manual or 6-speed automatic with Tiptronic for the Rabbit. Diesel engines have been unavailable on Rabbits, though they were offered through 2006 on the Jetta until tightening emissions regulations in the U.S. led to their temporary unavailability.

Volkswagen did not market the GT version to the US or Canada, though the VR6-powered R32 range-topping model was available in the United States.

== Models ==
=== Variant (wagon) ===
The station wagon version of the Golf Mk5 debuted at the International Geneva Motor Show in March 2007 and was marketed as the Golf Variant in European markets, in The United States as the Jetta SportWagen, and in Argentina and Uruguay as the Vento Variant. Designed by Murat Günak, it is more closely related to the Jetta saloon with a shared front fascia design and front doors. It was produced in Puebla, Mexico since April 2007 alongside the similar Jetta with a targeted annual production of 120,000 units.

Volkswagen did not intend to release the station wagon/estate version of the Golf Mk5 until later in its life cycle. Initially, Volkswagen expected the Golf Plus and Touran to be able to cover the station wagon segment left by the Golf, but it was reported that dealers and customers were asking for a conventional station wagon version.

The station wagon version was facelifted in late 2009, with changes including the front clip and interior from the Golf Mk6, while the remaining is based on the pre-facelifted model. It was marketed as the station wagon version of the Golf Mk6 as it was sold alongside it. The facelifted model was also marketed as the Golf Wagon and Variant in Canada and Mexico, while it continued to be sold as the Jetta SportWagen in the United States.

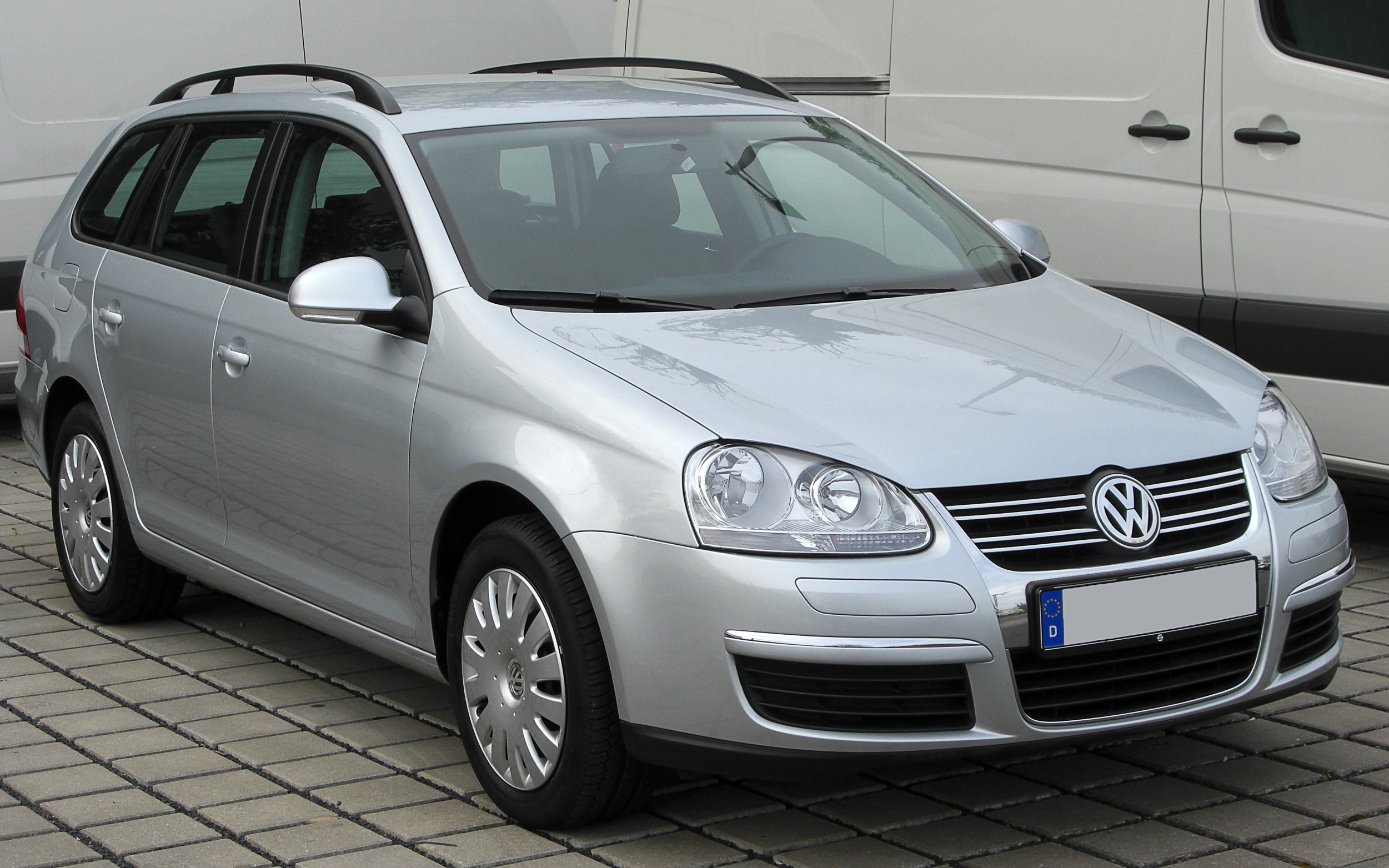
Golf Variant - front

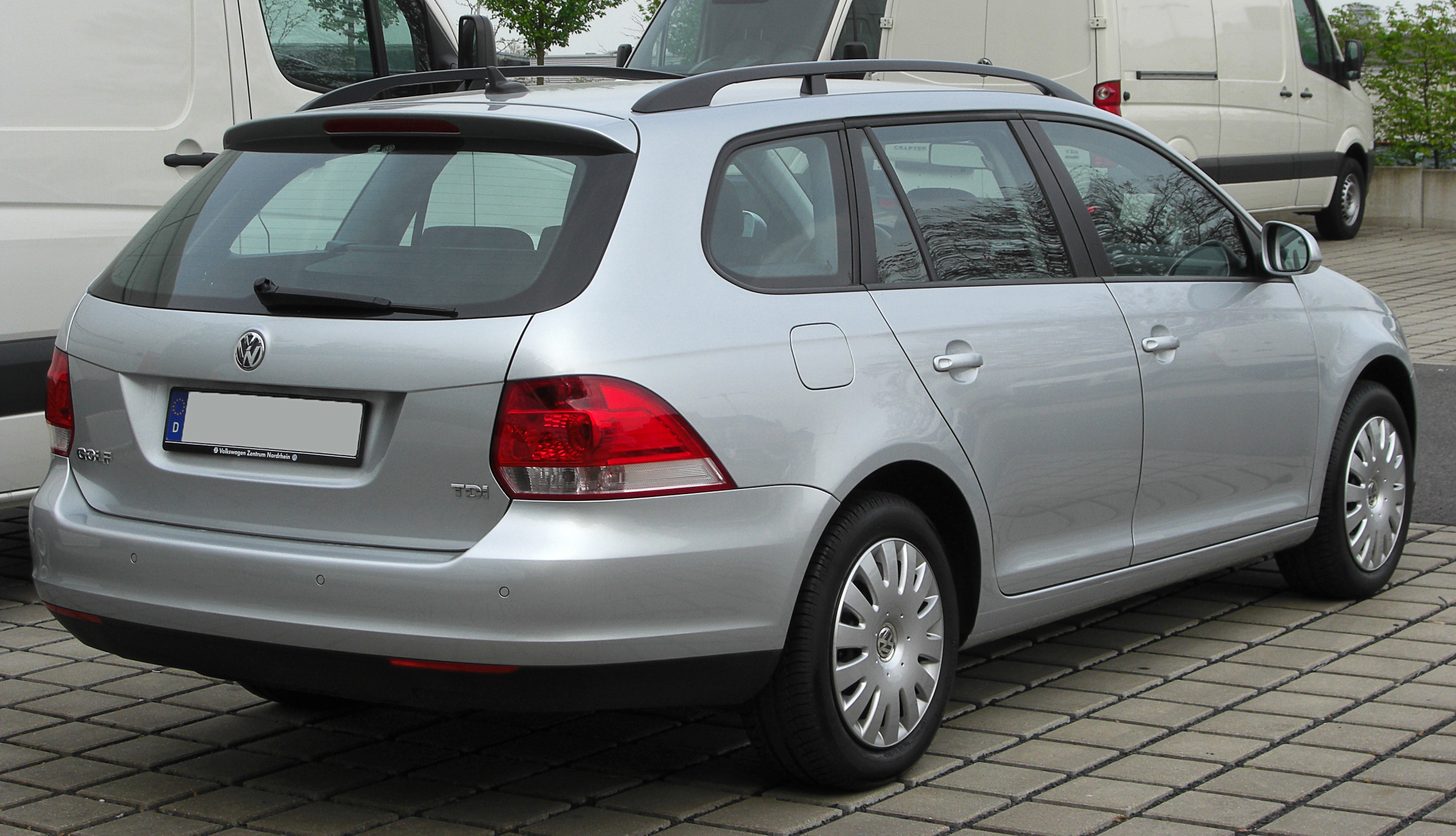
Golf Variant - rear

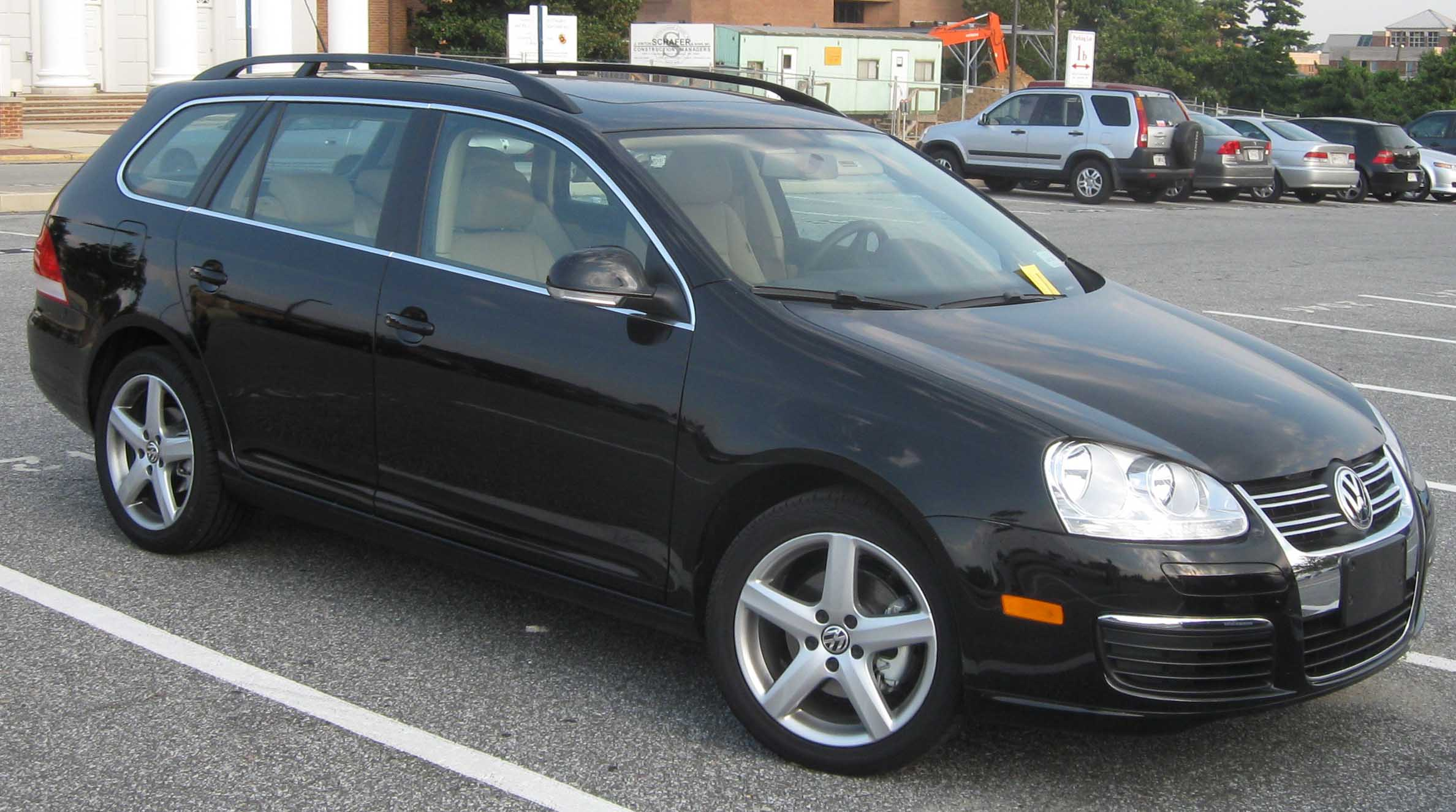
Jetta SportWagen (US)

=== Jetta Mk5 ===
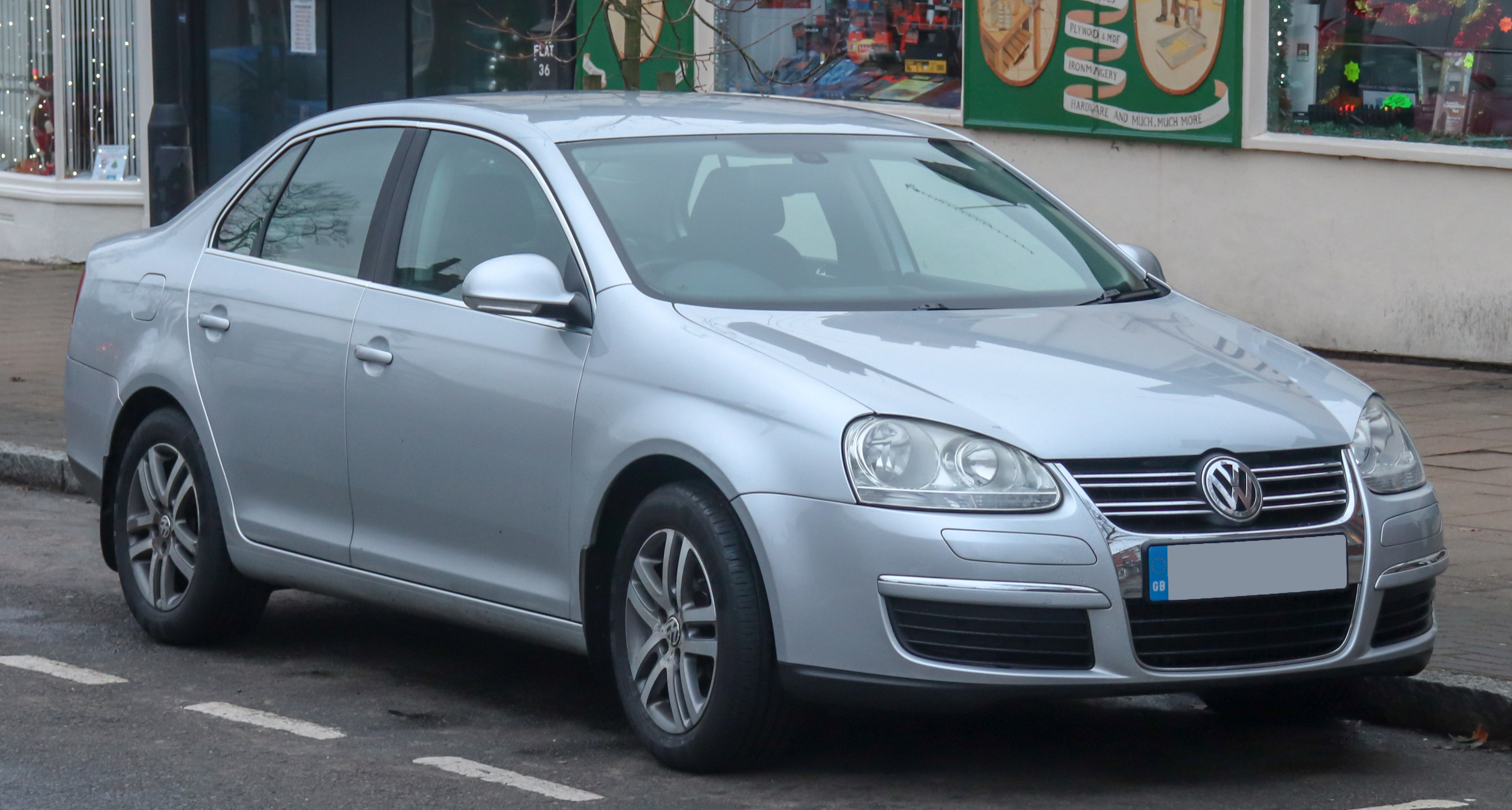
Volkswagen Jetta

Volkswagen marketed the three-box sedan variant of the Mk5 Golf since 2004 as the Jetta in North America and Europe, replacing the Bora name. It debuted at the Los Angeles Auto Show on 5 January 2005. It was marketed as the Volkswagen Bora in Mexico and Colombia, Volkswagen Vento in Argentina, Chile and Uruguay, and Volkswagen Sagitar in China. The Mk5 Jetta shared the front fascia, front fender panel and front doors with the Golf Variant, while the GLI variant adopted Golf GTI's front end. It is the last Jetta generation to be heavily based on the Golf, since the Jetta A6 used a dedicated bodywork. In the US market, the Jetta outsells the Golf/Rabbit by a ratio of 4 to 1.

=== Golf Plus ===
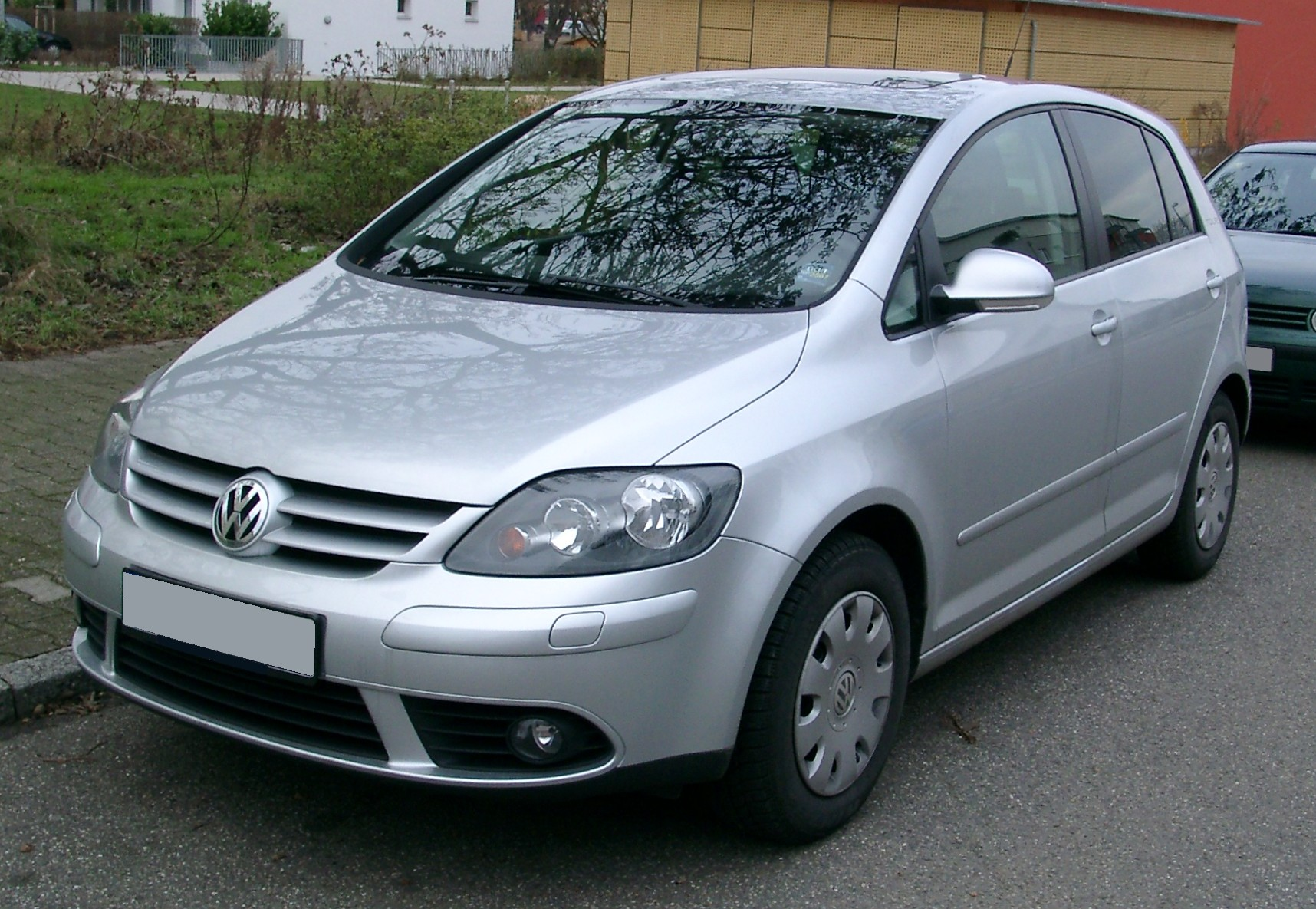
Volkswagen Golf Plus

In December 2004, Volkswagen announced the Golf Plus variant of the Golf Mk5. It is 95 mm (3.74 in) taller than the standard Golf, and 150 mm (5.91 in) shorter than the other compact MPV of the marque, the seven-seater Volkswagen Touran. It is sold up to 2014 when it was replaced by the Golf Sportsvan, with a refresh in December 2008. A crossover-styled version was released as the CrossGolf (Golf Plus Dune in UK) in 2006.

== Performance models ==
=== GT ===
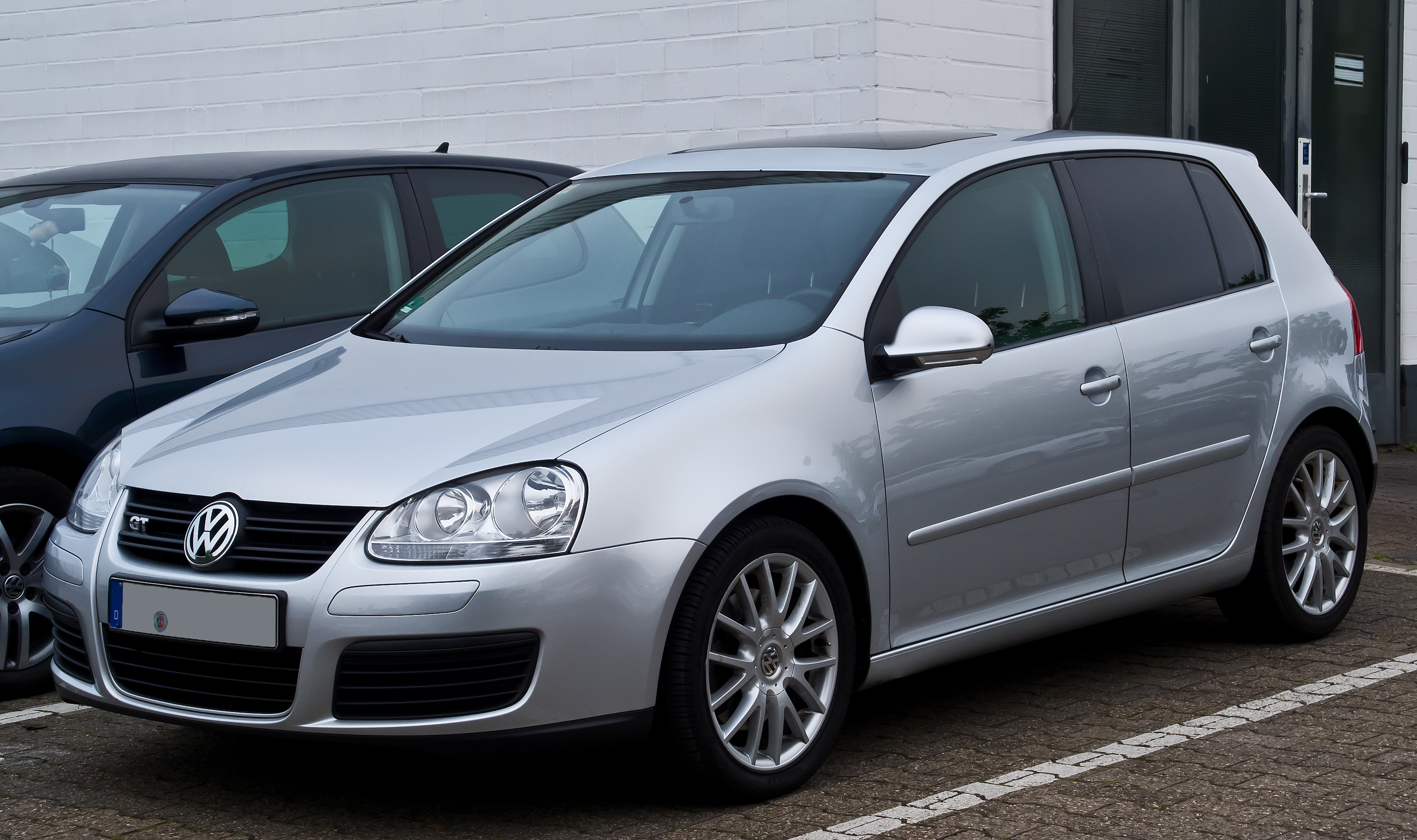
Golf GT

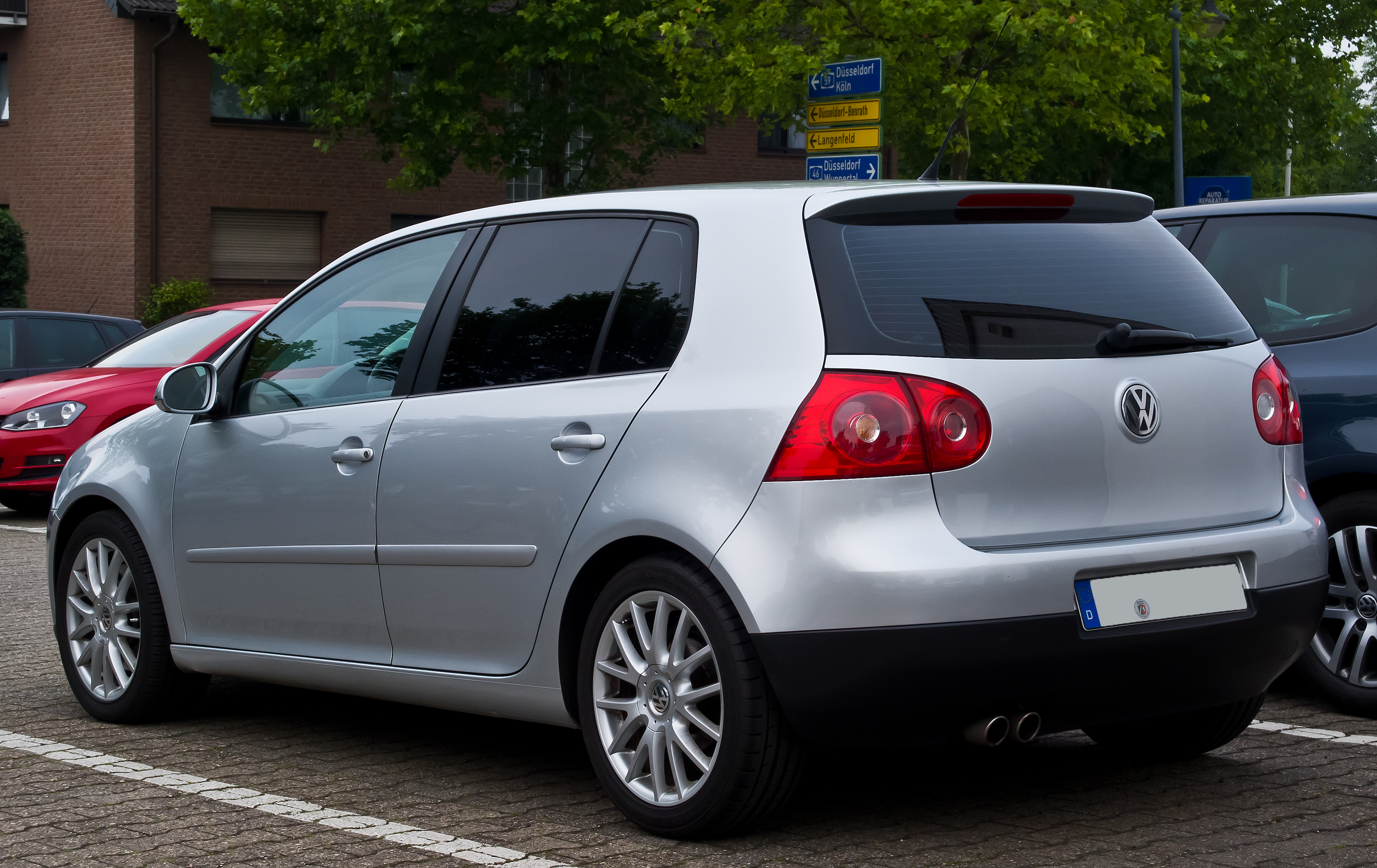
Golf GT

The Golf Mk5 GT features a choice of either 1.4 L petrol engine in twincharger (TSI) configuration, a 2.0 litre TDI diesel engine or a 2.0 (FSI) direct injection petrol engine. TSI petrol and diesels are available as 125 kW (170 PS; 168 bhp) versions. The PD diesel engine has 350 N⋅m (258 lb⋅ft) of torque, which is more than the range topping R32. The petrol engined offering contains the new TSI engine, which is based on the recent Fuel Stratified Injection (FSI), but with a pair of chargers forcing the induction of the air. The chargers are a single supercharger that disengages after a specified rev-range, at which point charging of the air is handled by a single turbocharger. This system benefits from both of the efficiency of the supercharger in the lower rev ranges, with the longevity of the turbocharger higher in the rev range. This results in little turbo lag, constant power delivery along the rev range, and better fuel efficiency than similarly powered 2.4 L V6 engine due to its small size. However, the power delivery of the petrol TSI engine was criticised as being very jerky by Jeremy Clarkson.

In the UK the GT sport badge was marketed as offering both high power and low emissions, sparking some controversy. The 125 kW (170 PS; 168 bhp) diesel offers 156g/km and returns 47.9 mpg combined with the petrol equivalent offering 175g/km and 38.2 mpg respectively.

Both petrol and diesel versions are also available with Direct-Shift Gearbox (DSG). Performance figures for the petrol vehicle are 0-100 km/h (62 mph) in 7.9 seconds (6-speed manual) and 7.7 seconds (DSG), with the diesel taking 8.2 seconds, and both reaching top speed of 220 km/h (137 mph).

The Golf GT features the same brakes as the Golf GTI, with 312 mm (12.3 in) ventilated front discs, and 286 mm (11.3 in) solid rears. It has also 15 mm (0.59 in) lowered suspension, which lowers its centre of gravity, it borrows the GTI's suspension/damper settings, uses 7Jx17" "ClassiXs" alloy wheels fitted with wide 225/45 R17 tyres, and has twin exhaust outlets.

=== GTI ===
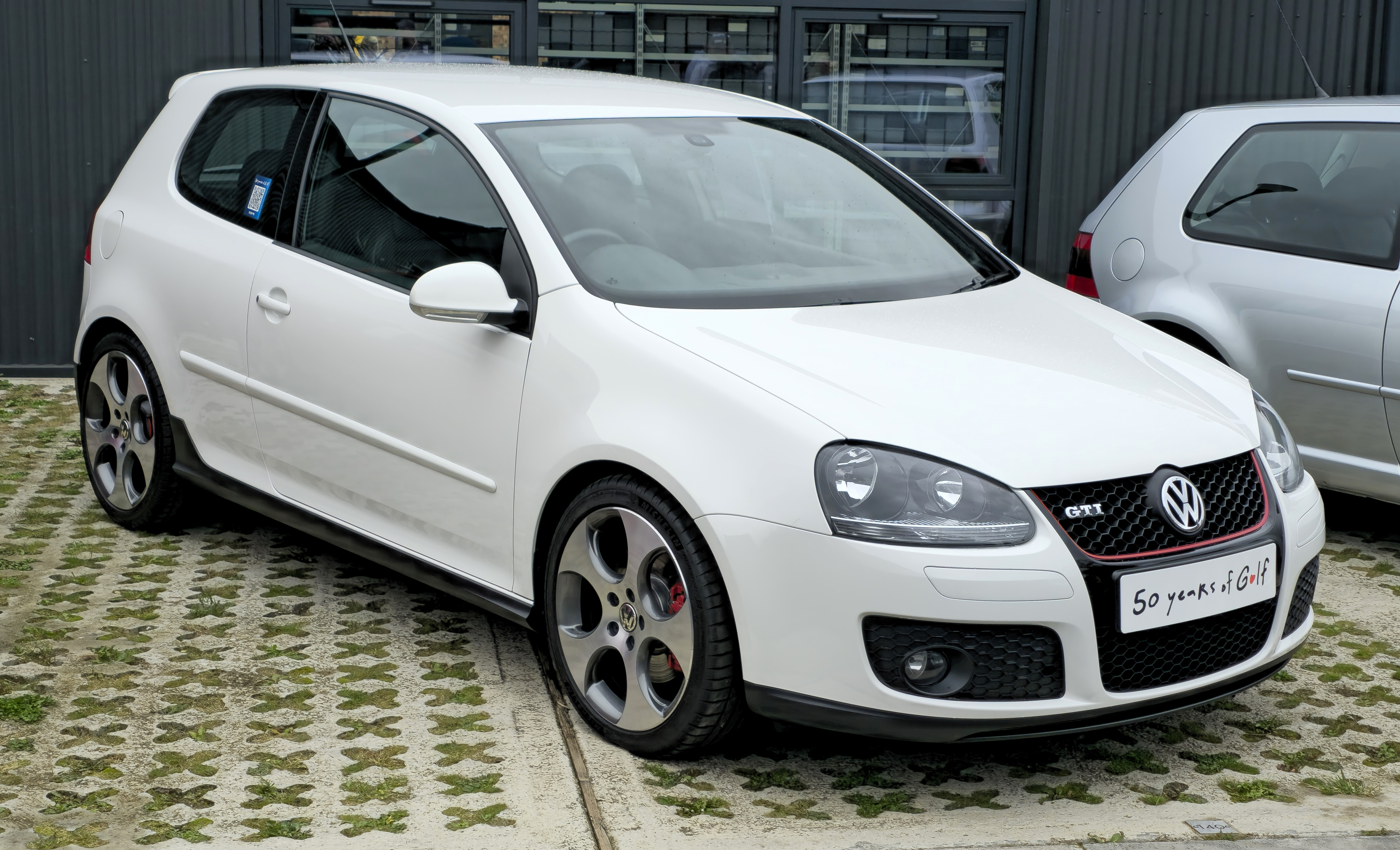
Golf GTI 3-door (UK)

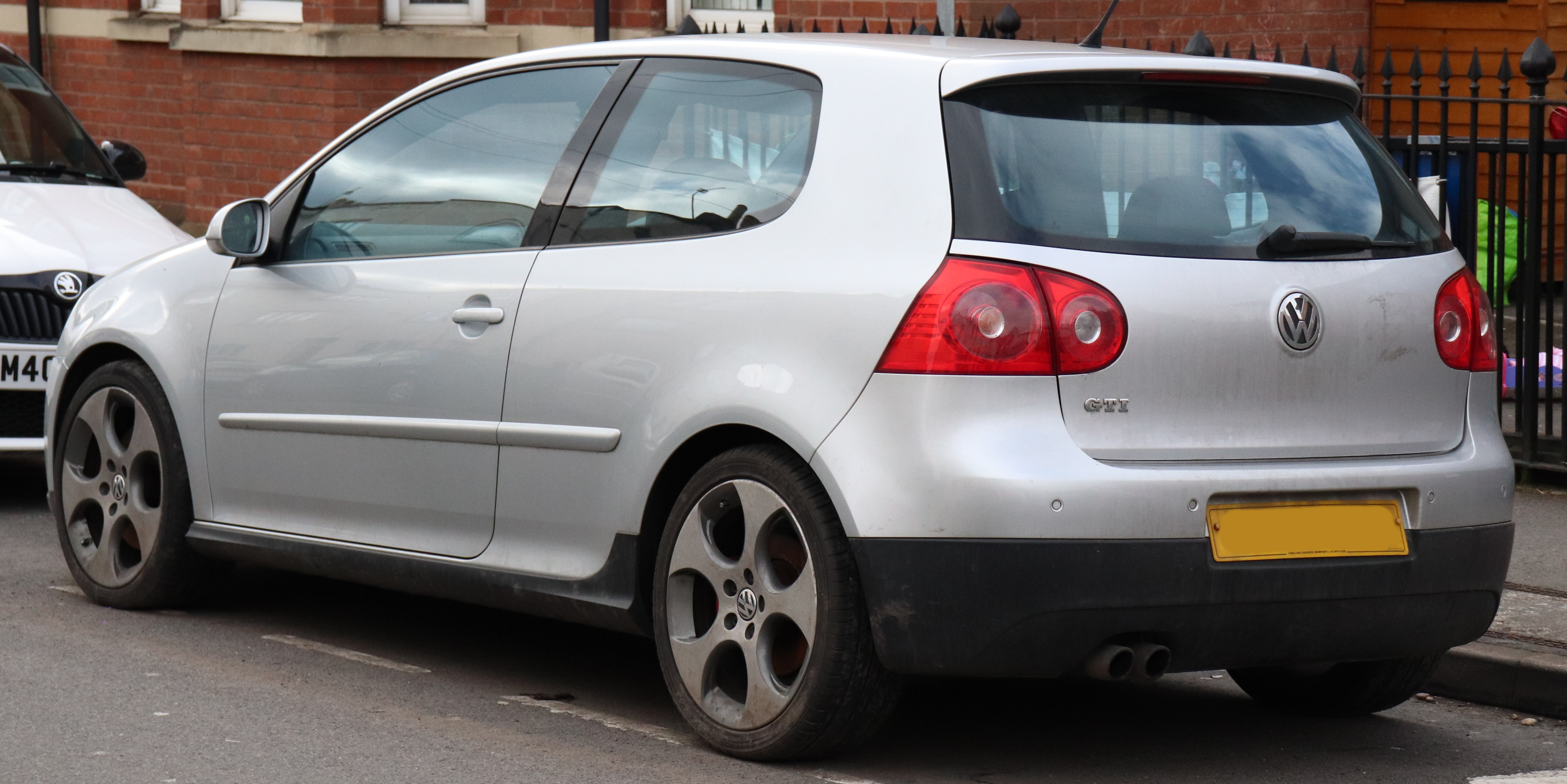
Golf GTI 3-door (UK)

The Golf GTI features a 2.0 litre turbocharged inline 4-cylinder petrol engine with Fuel Stratified Injection (FSI) direct-injection technology, rated 200 PS (147 kW; 197 bhp) at 5100–6000 rpm (240 PS (177 kW; 237 bhp) automatic) and 280 N⋅m (207 lbf⋅ft) torque at 1700–5000 rpm. It is available in both 3-door and 5-door hatchback body shapes, and comes with a choice of either a 6-speed manual or a 6-speed Direct-Shift Gearbox (DSG), which reduces shift time to 8ms.

Some Mk 5 GTIs bound for the North American Market produced in late 2008 and early 2009 came with a different engine. The EA113 engines used in the earlier years were traded for a new design in late 2008 as VW Audi Group began producing new engines for the upcoming Mk 6 GTI (among other models) which was released for sale in late 2009. Some of the Mk 5s exported to North America in these years received this new engine and were delivered to customers with the redesigned EA888 engine. This early version of the EA888 engine produced very similar horsepower and torque numbers compared to the EA113.

The main design changes came in the form of addressing known issues with the previous platform. A new high pressure fuel pump cam follower design that did not require periodic replacement due to wear was chief among them. Failure of this component in the EA113 design had the potential to lead to catastrophic engine failure if not replaced often enough. Further, the timing belt was replaced with a timing chain. This was done to address the reported problems with failed timing belts and tensioner assemblies that caused severe damage when not maintained properly in this interference engine design. One other notable change was the air intake and intake manifold design. The air intake was no longer integrated into the plastic engine cover and instead was routed around the right hand side near the battery. This design provided slightly reduced intake restriction and access to cooler air further from the engine.

The concept GTI was first shown to the public at the Frankfurt Motor Show in 2003. The first production model was initially unveiled at the Mondial de l'Automobile in Paris in September 2004, and went on sale around the world shortly thereafter. At the Los Angeles Auto Show in January 2006, the GTI made its long-awaited North American debut in 3-door guise (a 5-door variant was eventually made available), where it is marketed solely under the 'GTI' moniker, with no reference to the Rabbit. The new GTI has a considerable price increase over the previous model, mainly due to the features mentioned above, and the fact that the exterior itself had not seen such a dramatic design change in years. The price is further raised because it is built in Germany, unlike the Mk4 some of which were built in Brazil. The innovative DSG transmission and the 200 PS (147 kW; 197 hp) TFSI engine all helped raise the retail price of the car. The Mk5 GTI was named 2007 Automobile of the Year by Automobile Magazine, in December 2006.

This generation marked the only generation in Canada to have the GTI as a separate nameplate rather than a trim of the Golf. When Volkswagen announced the revival of the Golf in the US and Canada for the 2010 model year, Volkswagen reverted the GTI nameplate as a Golf trim, although the GTI remains a separate nameplate in the United States.

In Mexico, it is only sold as a 3-door hatchback. A special edition of the GTI was sold in 170 copies under a "Pirelli" limited edition with a 230 CV engine and only in a black colour.

=== R32 ===
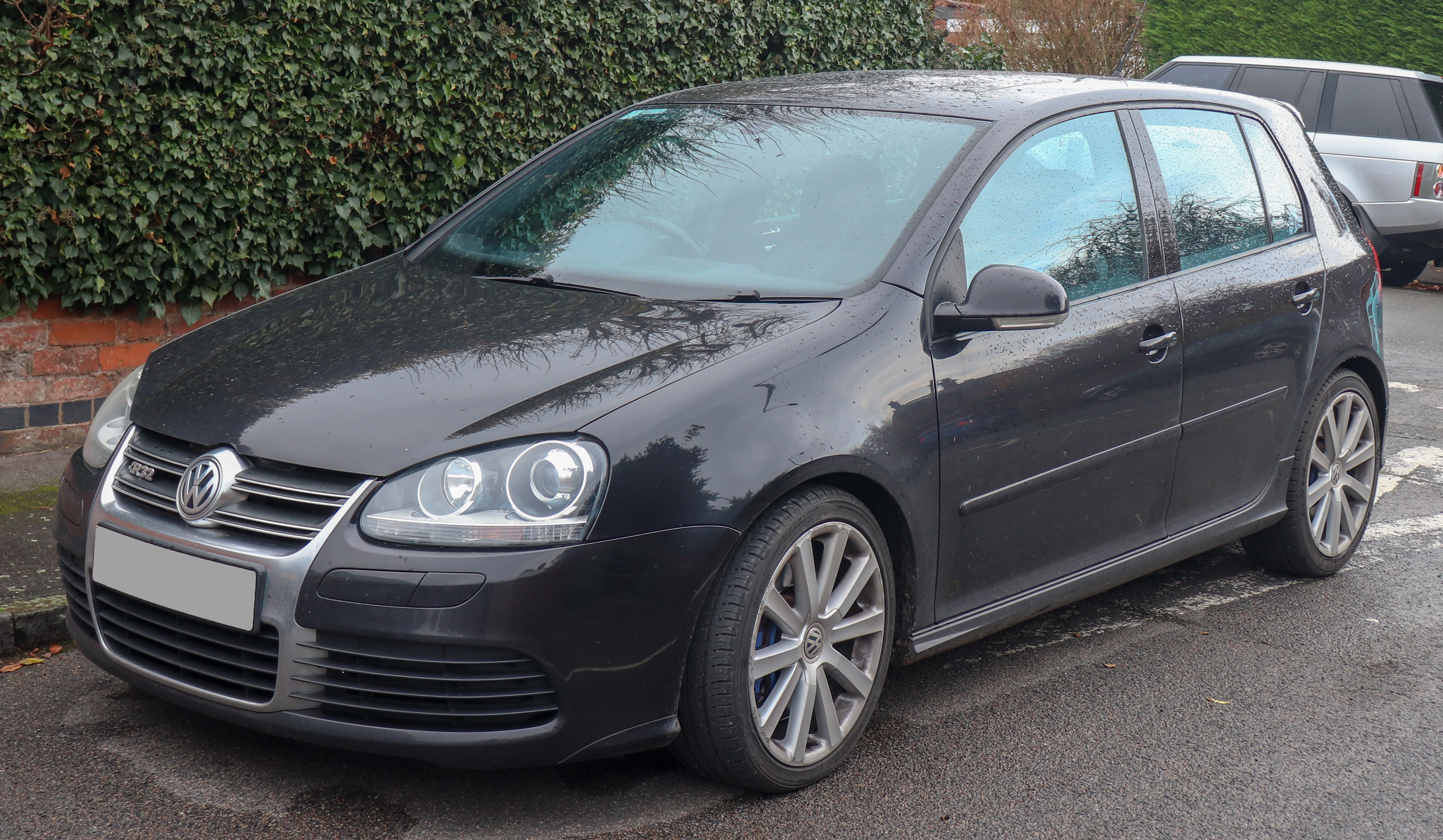
Golf R32 5-door

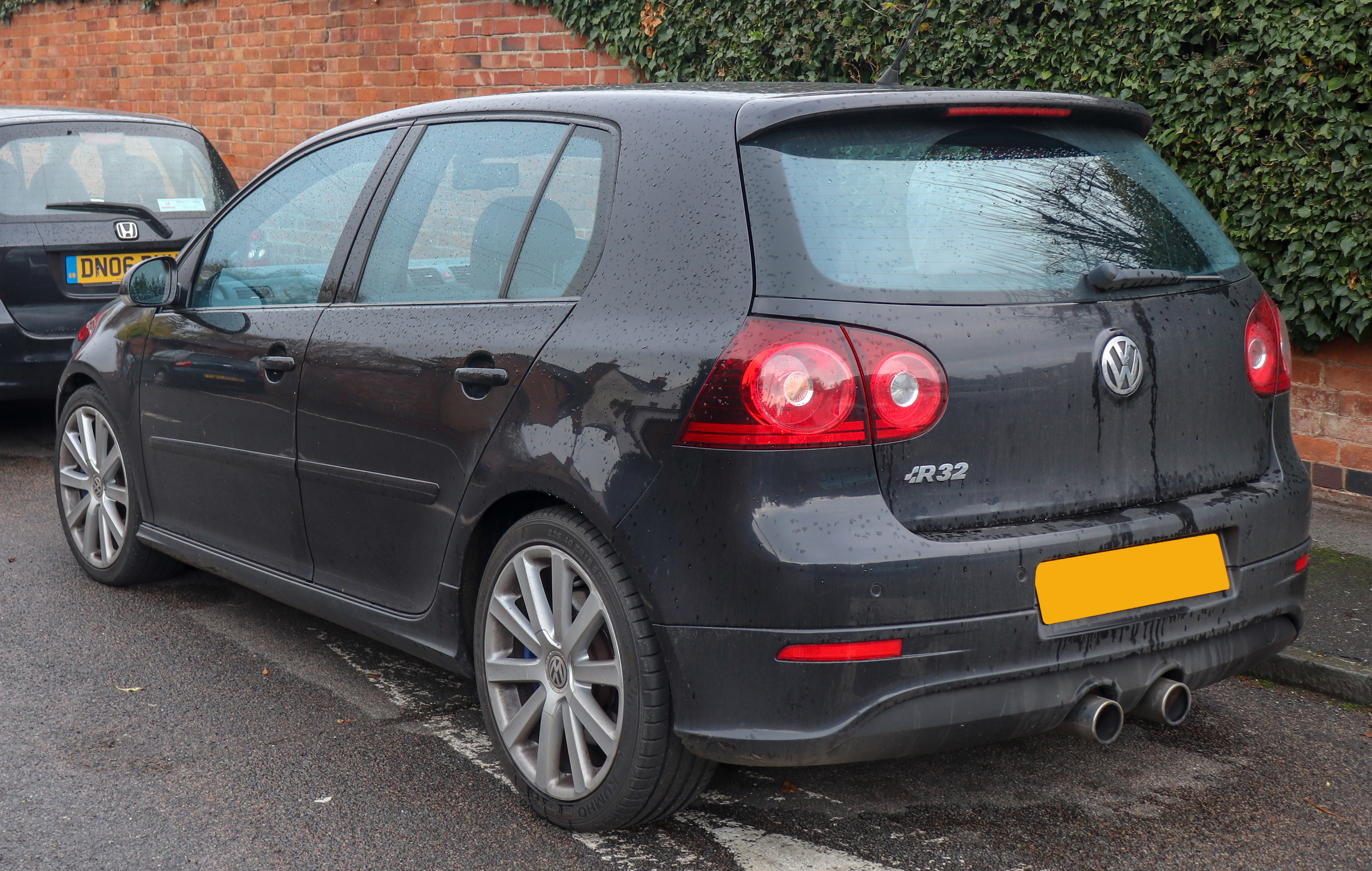
Golf R32 5-door

In September 2005, the Mk5 R32 went on sale in Europe. United Kingdom sales began in November that year. It features an updated 3.2-litre VR6 engine of that fitted to the previous Mk4 version, with an extra 10 PS (7 kW; 10 bhp) due to a reworked inlet manifold. Maximum power is now 250 PS (184 kW; 247 bhp) at 6,300 rpm; torque is unchanged at 320 N⋅m (236 lbf⋅ft). It reaches an electronically governed top speed of 250 km/h (155.3 mph). Going from 0 to 100 km/h (62 mph) will take 6.5 s, reduced to 6.2 s with the Direct-Shift Gearbox.

Compared with the previous Mk4 R32, it is 0.1 seconds faster for the manual version, while the newer R32 is about 40 kg (88.2 lb) heavier. As with the previous R32; there is the Haldex Traction-based 4motion part-time four-wheel drive, now through 18" Zolder 20-spoke alloy wheels. Stopping the R32 comes in the form of blue-painted brake calipers with 345 mm (13.58 in) discs at the front and 310 mm (12.20 in) disks at the rear.

The Mk5 R32 was released in the US in August 2007 with a limited production run of 5000. Each R32 has its production number laser etched on its steering wheel.

In Chile, the Golf Mk5 was only offered in this model, while the standard Golf model offered was the Brazilian-made Mk4.

== Special editions ==
=== GTI Edition 30 ===
Following Volkswagen's successful 20th anniversary edition GTI (1996 in Europe, and 2003 for the North American market), and the 25th anniversary GTI (in 2001 for Europe only) models, Volkswagen marked the GTI's 30th anniversary by producing the GTI Edition 30.

Going on sale in November 2006 from £22,295 RRP, with an initial goal of a limited production run of 1500 (Europe models), the Edition 30 was available in 6 colours; Tornado Red, Black, Candy White, Reflex Silver (Metallic), Steel Grey (Metallic) and finally Diamond Black (Pearl). Due to strong demand, 2280 cars were eventually built with a small number continuing into the 2009 model year. The changes over the standard production model included a different forged engine (same as Audi S3 8P has) and powered by K04 turbo that produced an extra 30 PS (22 kW; 30 bhp) more than the standard 200 PS (147 kW; 197 bhp) version, raising the output to 230 PS (169 kW; 227 bhp), giving rumour that it was faster in the dry and more powerful than the R32. Slight changes to the body work included body coloured side skirts and Votex front spoiler, colour-keyed rear bumper and tinted rear lights from the R32. Changes to the interior included a return for the golf ball shaped gear knob and silver "Edition 30" logo'd sill plates. Edition 30 seats were also decked out in the distinctive red stitching on 'Vienna' leather and 'Interlagos' fabric mix. Red stitching was also added to the leather-covered steering wheel. Finally, dependent on the market and the options available the Edition 30 was available with 18" BBS originated 'Pescara' alloy wheels, or black versions of the 18" 'Monza II' alloy wheels.

Performance was marginally improved: with 0-100 km/h (62 mph) coming at 6.8 seconds (6.6 seconds for DSG-equipped models), and a top speed of 245 km/h (152 mph) (manual) or 243 km/h (151 mph) (DSG).

=== Fahrenheit Edition ===
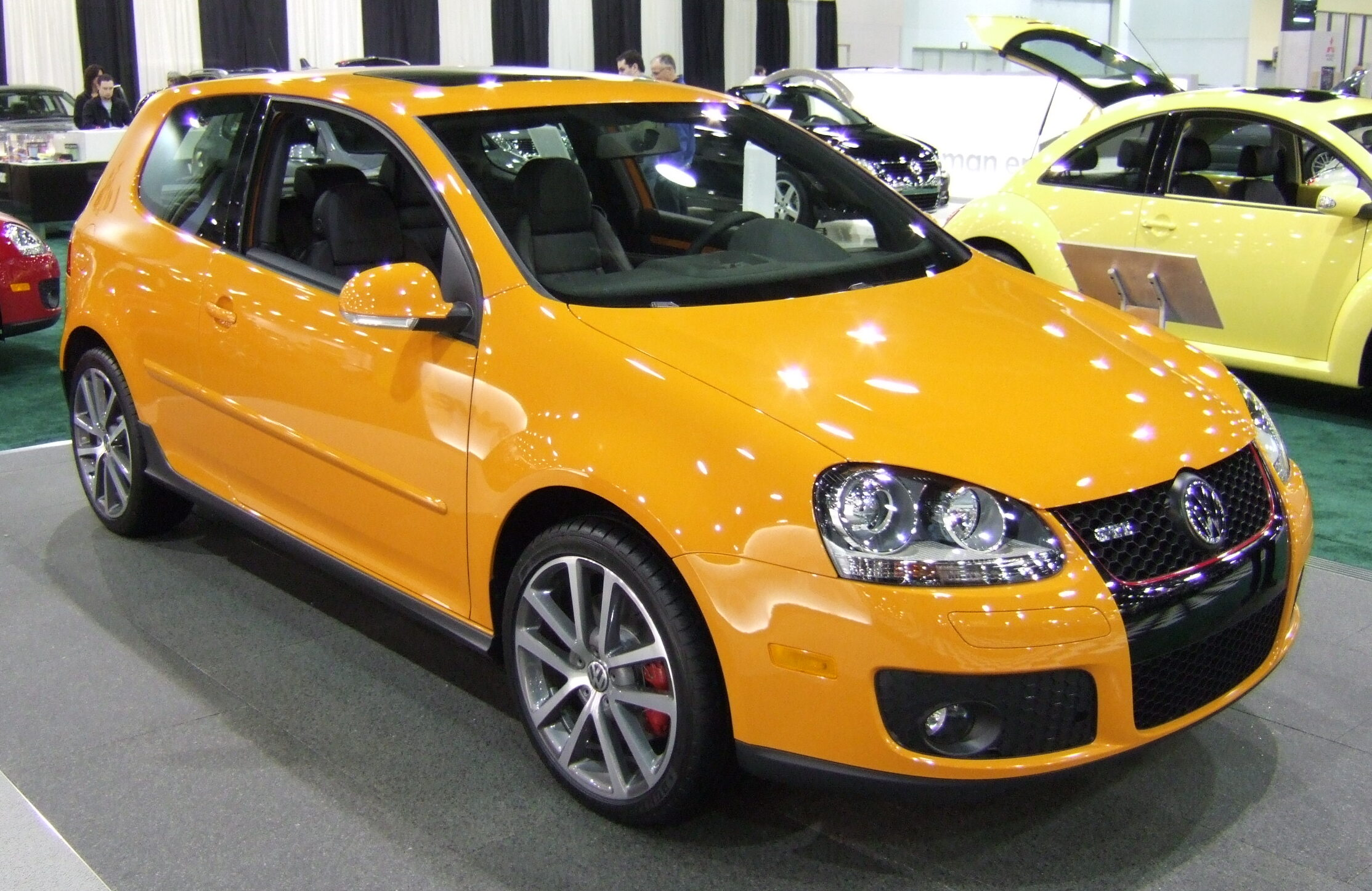
GTI Fahrenheit Edition (2007)

In October 2006, Volkswagen debuted a new Fahrenheit Edition of their GTI and GLI models at the Playboy Mansion. These new models were the first special-edition versions of the GTI and GLI made available in North America, and the first of the new models arrived in dealers in the early March 2007.

Fahrenheit models of the GTI were distinguished by their Magma Orange paint job, special Fahrenheit badging, a commemorative plate placed on the steering wheel, body-coloured interior panels, orange stitching on the DSG boot, steering wheel, park brake handle and floor mats (from which the red GTI logo had been removed), as well as special gunmetal-colored 18" "Charleston" wheels. The Fahrenheit also came with a European tuned suspension.

The Fahrenheit GTI was available with Volkswagen's DSG transmission or 6-speed manual. A total of 1200 Fahrenheit GTI models in Magma Orange were produced for the US (150 in Canada) and 1200 GLIs in yellow (not available in Canada)(600 DSG 600 manual). US pricing started at $27,665.

=== Pirelli Edition ===
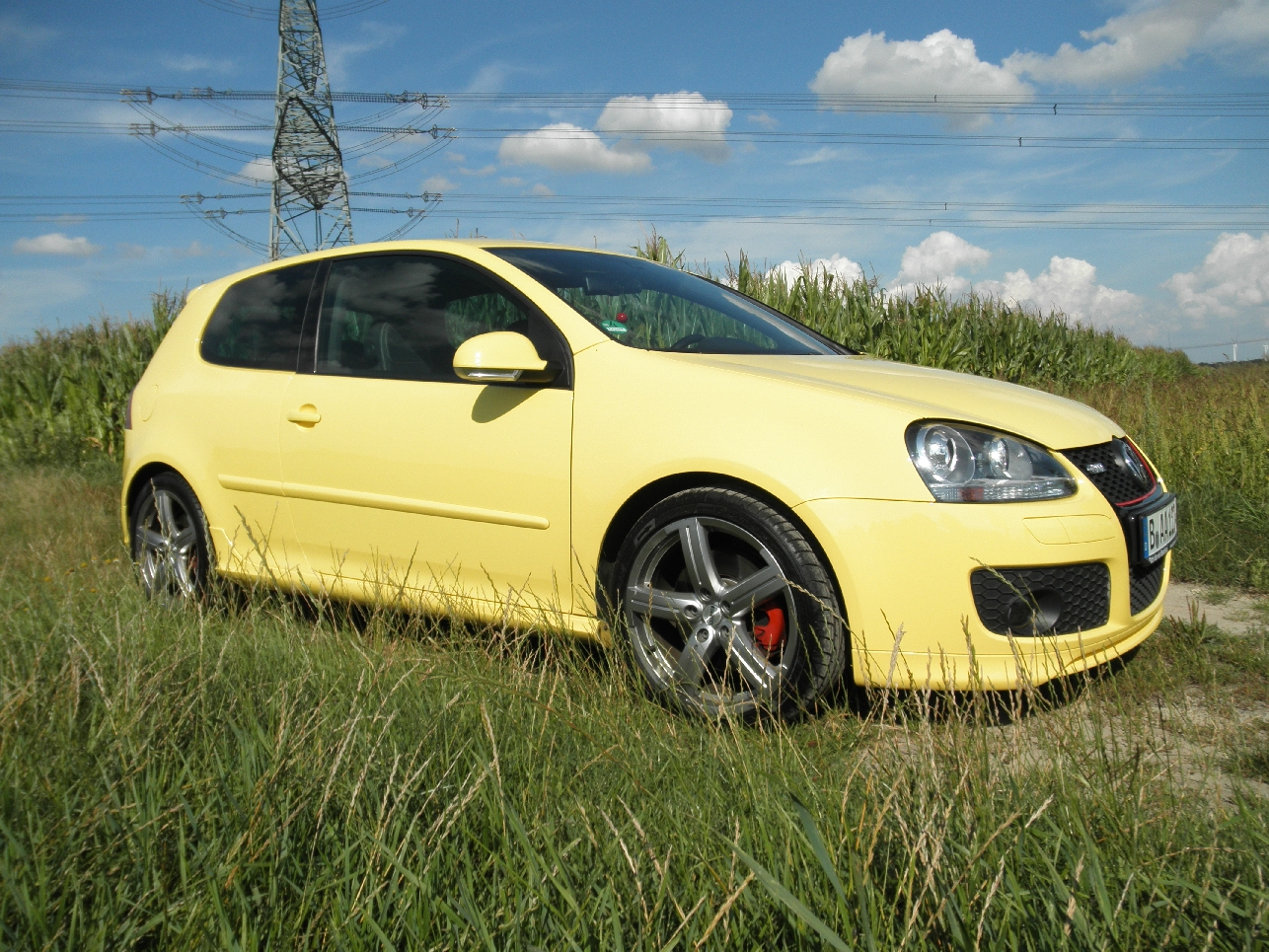
GTI Pirelli Edition (2007)

This is a special edition GTI, developed by Volkswagen Individual. It was given the 230 PS (169 kW; 227 hp) Edition 30 engine, instead of the 200 PS (147 kW; 197 hp) in the standard Mk5 GTI. It is equipped with 225/40R18 Pirelli P-Zero tyres on titanium colored alloy wheels. It is available with a 6-speed manual or an optional DSG gearbox.

It features leather sport seats in "San Remo" microfiber with embossed Pirelli tyre tread pattern down the centre. It also has yellow stitching on the seats, steering wheel and gear shift. There is also a Pirelli logo on the head restraints. The exterior and valences are painted sunflower yellow. Other colours are also available.

=== GTI W12-650 ===
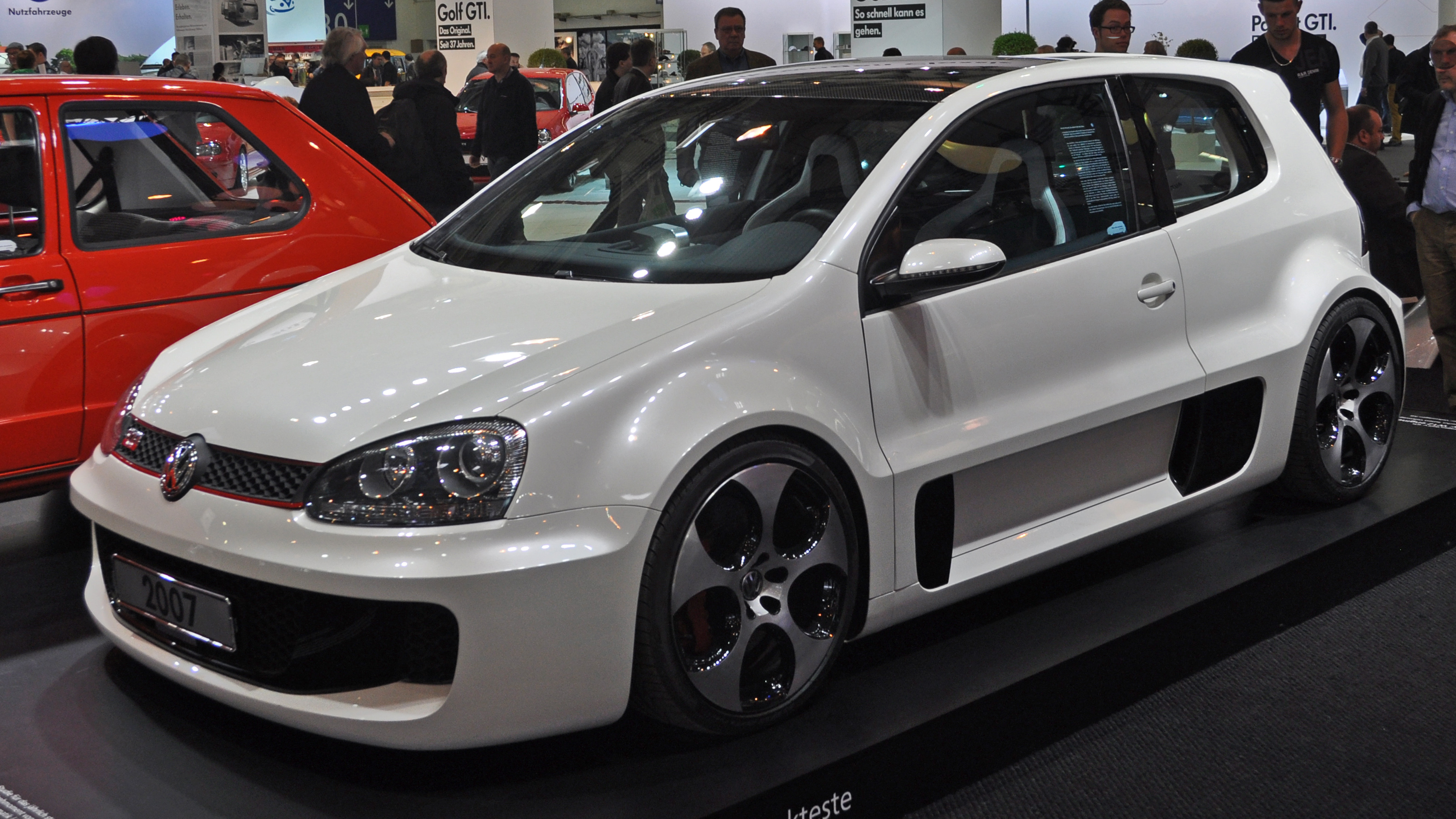
Volkswagen Golf V GTI W12-650

Volkswagen unveiled the GTI W12-650 at the GTI Festival in Wörthersee, Austria, in May, 2007. It was designed as a concept car, and only one is known to exist. Unlike many concept cars, it is mechanically functional to the extent that it can be driven. Due to the rushed build time of the car (8 weeks), however, not all of its features function fully. At the time of introduction, the steering-wheel mounted paddle-shifters were not linked to the transmission, the hazard lights did not function, the stereo system didn't work, and the heating and air-conditioning system of the car didn't function due to the dashboard controls never being linked to the unit.

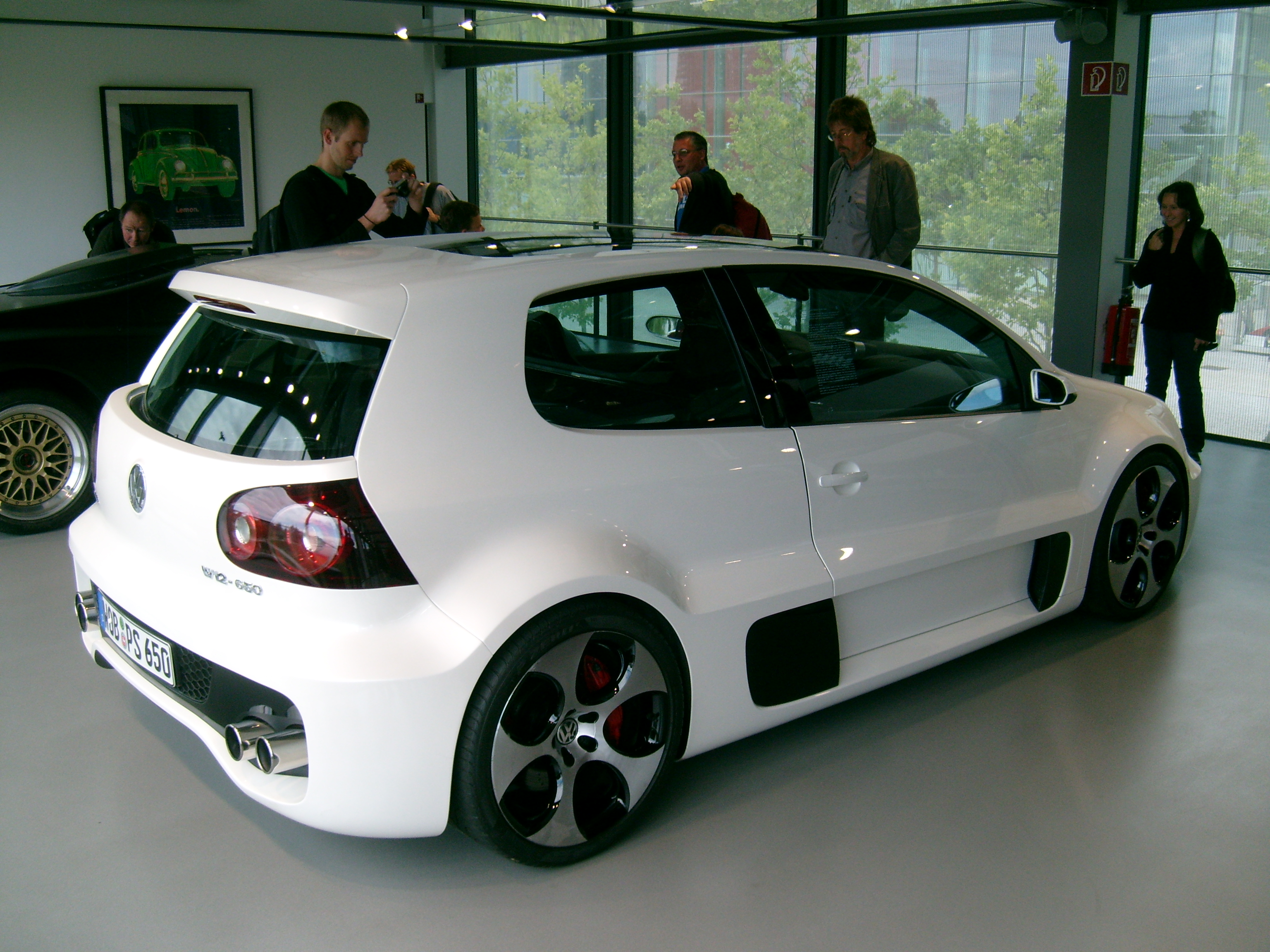
GTI W12-650 rear view

The car features a 6.0L W12 bi-turbo engine from the Bentley Continental GT producing 650 PS (478 kW; 641 hp) and 720 N⋅m (531 lb⋅ft) of torque, which reportedly allows it to accelerate from 0-100 km/h (62.1 mph) in 3.7 seconds and reach a top speed of 202 mph (325 km/h). The W12 differs from the standard GTI in several ways. It features 19-inch wheels that resemble the GTI's original wheels, it is 70 mm (2.76 in) lower and 160 mm (6.30 in) wider, the rear seats have been removed to accommodate the mid-engine design, the roof is made from carbon-fibre composite, the front brakes are from the Audi RS4, and the rear brakes and axle are from a Lamborghini Gallardo. The W12-650 achieved a time of 1:29.6 on BBC Top Gear's Power Lap feature. Jeremy Clarkson showed that the car had some trouble with high-speed cornering but was extremely fast in the straight sections of the track. In February 2026, Volkswagen brought out the concept again, now repainted in Tornado Red, for the Golf's 50th birthday.

== Concepts ==
=== TDI Hybrid ===
A VW Golf TDI Hybrid concept was shown at the March 2008 Geneva Motor Show. The concept vehicle shown had a 74 hp (55 kW) three-cylinder TDI engine – probably the 1.4 litre used in the Volkswagen Polo BlueMotion – mated to a 27 horsepower (20 kW) electric motor, and a seven-speed double-clutch DSG transmission. The electric power system is a Nickel-metal hydride battery in the boot, and a regenerative braking system. An "energy monitor" display on the dashboard keeps tabs on what the powertrain is doing, and provides both a stop/start capability and a full-electric mode at low speed. The design also includes concepts introduced via BlueMotion, with smaller grille and thinner low-resistance tyres. According to Germany's Auto Bild, the car will get 69.9 mpg, and emit 90 g/km of carbon dioxide, less than the 104 g/km emitted by the Toyota Prius and 116 emitted by the Honda Civic Hybrid. The TDI Hybrid was expected to be marketed in Europe from mid-2009.

VW has decided against launching the Golf TDI Hybrid as originally planned. Instead, the company is opting to integrate the hybrid system with a 1.4 TFSI four-cylinder engine. In a statement during the Geneva press conference, VW mentioned that while the Golf TDI Hybrid remains a concept for now, there is a good chance a similar model will hit production lines in the future. According to VW of America spokesperson Keith Price, there are currently no definite plans to put the car into production. It remains purely conceptual at this stage.

=== Twin Drive ===
VW CEO Martin Winterkorn announced Volkswagen Golf Twin Drive plug-in hybrid vehicle based on Mark V Golf, which uses 2.0L 122 PS (90 kW) turbodiesel and 82 PS (60 kW) electric motor with lithium-ion batteries. The car could run about 50 kilometres on battery power. The combined power was 174 PS (128 kW).

Volkswagen never developed the Twin Drive system for the Golf. It was planned to be developed with 8 German partners and planned a trial fleet of 20 Golfs outfitted with the system in 2010.

The production version was expected to be based on Mark VI Golf featuring a 1.5-litre turbodiesel engine and electric motor, with estimated arrival date of 2015.

== Engines ==
| Name | Volume | Engine | Fuel | Output | Torque | 0–100 km/h (0–62 mph) (s) | Top speed | CO_{2} | Years |
|---|---|---|---|---|---|---|---|---|---|
| 1.4 | 1390 cc | 4cyl | Petrol | 75 PS (55 kW; 74 hp) at 5,000 rpm | 126 N⋅m (93 lb⋅ft) at 3,800 rpm | 14.7 | 164 km/h (102 mph) | 168 g/km | 2003–2006 |
| 1.4 | 1390 cc | 4cyl | Petrol | 80 PS (59 kW; 79 hp) at 5,000 rpm | 132 N⋅m (97 lb⋅ft) at 3,800 rpm | 13.9 | 168 km/h (104 mph) | 164 g/km | 2006–2008 |
| 1.4 FSI | 1390 cc | 4cyl | Petrol | 90 PS (66 kW; 89 hp) at 5,200 rpm | 130 N⋅m (96 lb⋅ft) at 3,750 rpm | 12.9 | 174 km/h (108 mph) | 156 g/km | 2003–2006 |
| 1.6 | 1595 cc | 4cyl | Petrol | 102 PS (75 kW; 101 hp) at 5,600 rpm | 148 N⋅m (109 lb⋅ft) at 3,800 rpm | 11.4 | 184 km/h (114 mph) | 184 g/km | 2004–2008 |
| 1.6 FSI | 1598 cc | 4cyl | Petrol | 115 PS (85 kW; 113 hp) at 6,000 rpm | 155 N⋅m (114 lb⋅ft) at 4,000 rpm | 10.8 | 192 km/h (119 mph) | 168 g/km | 2003–2007 |
| 1.4 TSI | 1390 cc | 4cyl | Petrol | 122 PS (90 kW; 120 hp) at 5,000 rpm | 200 N⋅m (148 lb⋅ft) at 1,500–4,000 rpm | 9.4 | 197 km/h (122 mph) | 149 g/km | 2007–2008 |
| 1.4 TSI | 1390 cc | 4cyl | Petrol | 140 PS (103 kW; 138 hp) at 5,600 rpm | 220 N⋅m (162 lb⋅ft) at 1,500–4,000 rpm | 8.8 | 205 km/h (127 mph) | 169 g/km | 2005–2007 |
| 1.4 TSI | 1390 cc | 4cyl | Petrol | 170 PS (125 kW; 168 hp) at 6,000 rpm | 240 N⋅m (177 lb⋅ft) at 1,750–4,750 rpm | 7.9 | 220 km/h (140 mph) | 174 g/km | 2005–2007 |
| 2.0 FSI | 1984 cc | 4cyl | Petrol | 150 PS (110 kW; 148 hp) at 6,000 rpm | 200 N⋅m (148 lb⋅ft) at 3,250–4,250 rpm | 8.9 | 209 km/h (130 mph) | 187 g/km | 2004–2008 |
| 2.0 TFSI GTI | 1984 cc | 4cyl | Petrol | 200 PS (147 kW; 197 hp) at 5,100–6,000 rpm | 280 N⋅m (207 lb⋅ft) at 1,800–5,000 rpm | 6.9 | 234 km/h (145 mph) | 189 g/km | 2004–2008 |
| 2.0 TFSI (edn 30) | 1984 cc | 4cyl | Petrol | 230 PS (169 kW; 227 hp) at 5,500 rpm | 300 N⋅m (221 lb⋅ft) at 2,200–5,200 rpm | 6.6 | 245 km/h (152 mph) | 194 g/km | 2007–2010 |
| R32 | 3189 cc | VR6 | Petrol | 250 PS (184 kW; 247 hp) at 6,300 rpm | 320 N⋅m (236 lb⋅ft) at 2,500–3,000 rpm | 6.2 | 250 km/h (155 mph) | 255 g/km | 2005–2008 |
| 2.0 SDI | 1968 cc | 4cyl | Diesel | 75 PS (55 kW; 74 hp) at 4,200 rpm | 140 N⋅m (103 lb⋅ft) at 2,200–2,400 rpm | 16.7 | 163 km/h (101 mph) | 143 g/km | 2004–2008 |
| 1.9 TDI | 1896 cc | 4cyl | Diesel | 90 PS (66 kW; 89 hp) at 4,000 rpm | 210 N⋅m (155 lb⋅ft) at 1,800–2,500 rpm | 12.9 | 176 km/h (109 mph) | 132 g/km | 2004–2008 |
| 1.9 TDI | 1896 cc | 4cyl | Diesel | 105 PS (77 kW; 104 hp) at 4,000 rpm | 250 N⋅m (184 lb⋅ft) at 1,900 rpm | 11.3 | 187 km/h (116 mph) | 135 g/km | 2003–2008 |
| 1.9 TDI BlueMotion | 1896 cc | 4cyl | Diesel | 105 PS (77 kW; 104 hp) at 4,000 rpm | 250 N⋅m (184 lb⋅ft) at 1,900 rpm | 11.3 | 190 km/h (120 mph) | 119 g/km | 2007–2008 |
| 2.0 TDI | 1968 cc | 4cyl | Diesel | 140 PS (103 kW; 138 hp) at 4,000 rpm | 320 N⋅m (236 lb⋅ft) at 1,750–2,500 rpm | 9.3 | 203 km/h (126 mph) | 146 g/km | 2003–2008 |
| 2.0 TDI DPF | 1968 cc | 4cyl | Diesel | 140 PS (103 kW; 138 hp) at 4,000 rpm | 320 N⋅m (236 lb⋅ft) at 1,800–2,500 rpm | 9.3 | 205 km/h (127 mph) | 145 g/km | 2006–2008 |
| 2.0 TDI DPF | 1968 cc | 4cyl | Diesel | 170 PS (125 kW; 168 hp) at 4,200 rpm | 350 N⋅m (258 lb⋅ft) at 1,800–2,500 rpm | 8.2 | 220 km/h (140 mph) | 156 g/km | 2006–2008 |

== Safety ==
In 2004, the Mk5 received a 5-star Euro NCAP rating. The 2010 edition of Monash University's Used Car Safety Ratings, found that the Golf Mk5 provides an "excellent" (five out of five stars) level of occupant safety protection in the event of an accident.

ANCAP test results* Volkswagen Golf 5 door hatch (2004)
| Test | Score |
|---|---|
| Overall | 5 /5 stars |
| Frontal offset | 12.83/16 |
| Side impact | 16/16 |
| Pole | 2/2 |
| Seat belt reminders | 2/3 |
| Whiplash protection | Not Assessed |
| Pedestrian protection | Adequate |
| Electronic stability control | Not Assessed |

== Motorsport ==
In auto racing, APR Motorsport has led two MKV VW GTI's to victory in the Grand-Am KONI Sports Car Challenge and Continental Tire Sports Car Challenge Street Tuner (ST) class.

== Notes ==
- The Mk5 model was skipped in the Chinese market as the successor of the Volkswagen Golf Mk4. Golf Mk4 production continued until the 2008 model year and was manufactured by FAW Volkswagen, alongside the Chinese-built Volkswagen Bora HS which shared similar styling cues. The Mk4 Golf and Bora HS ended production in 2008 and 2009 respectively, where they were both succeeded by the Volkswagen Golf Mk6 for the 2010 model year.

== Awards ==
- 2009 Car and Driver – Among Ten Best of the Year (GTI)
- 2009 Automobile Magazine – Among All Stars (GTI)
- 2008 CNN – Top Sporty Car (GTI/R32)
- 2008 AutoPacific Vehicle Satisfaction Award (GTI)
- 2008 Consumer Reports – Top Hatchback (Golf/Rabbit)
- 2008 Car and Driver – Top Ten Urban Vehicle (Golf/Rabbit)
- 2008 Automobile Magazine – Among All Stars (GTI)
- 2008 Car and Driver – Among Ten Best of the Year (GTI)
- 2008 Drive – Best Performance Car under $60k AUS (GTI)
- 2008 What Car? – Best Small Family Car
- 2007 Car and Driver – Among Ten Best of the Year (GTI)
- 2007 Automobile Magazine – Car of the Year (GTI)
- 2007 Drive – Best Performance Car under $60k AUS (GTI)
- 2007 What Car? – Best Small Family Car
- 2006 Drive – Best Performance Car under $60k AUS (GTI)
- 2006 Australia's Best Cars – Best Sports Car (GTI)
- 2005 Australia's Best Cars – Best Sports Car under $57,000 (GTI)
- 2005 Auto Express – Best Hot Hatch (GTI)
- 2005 Auto Express – Best Sporting Car (GTI)
- 2004–05 Japan's Import Car of the Year
- 2004 What Car? Car of the Year
- 2004 What Car? Best Small Family Car
- 2004 Winner – Auto Express New Car Honours
- 2004 Fifth Gear – Car of the Year (GTI)
- 2004 Top Gear – Car of the Year (GTI)

| Preceded by Volkswagen Golf Mk4 | Volkswagen Golf Mk5; 2003–2010 | Succeeded by Volkswagen Golf Mk6 |
