= Murat Günak =

Turkish car designer

- Born: 9 August 1957 (age 69); Istanbul, Turkey
- Occupation: Car designer
- Employer: Togg

Murat Günak (born 9 August 1957, Istanbul) is a Turkish car designer and former head designer of Volkswagen and Mercedes-Benz.

== Career ==
Günak studied design at Hochschule für Bildende Künste (Academy of Fine Arts) in Kassel and then studied at the Royal College of Art in London under Claude Lobo and Patrick Le Quément where he was awarded Master of Automotive Design and was sponsored by Ford.

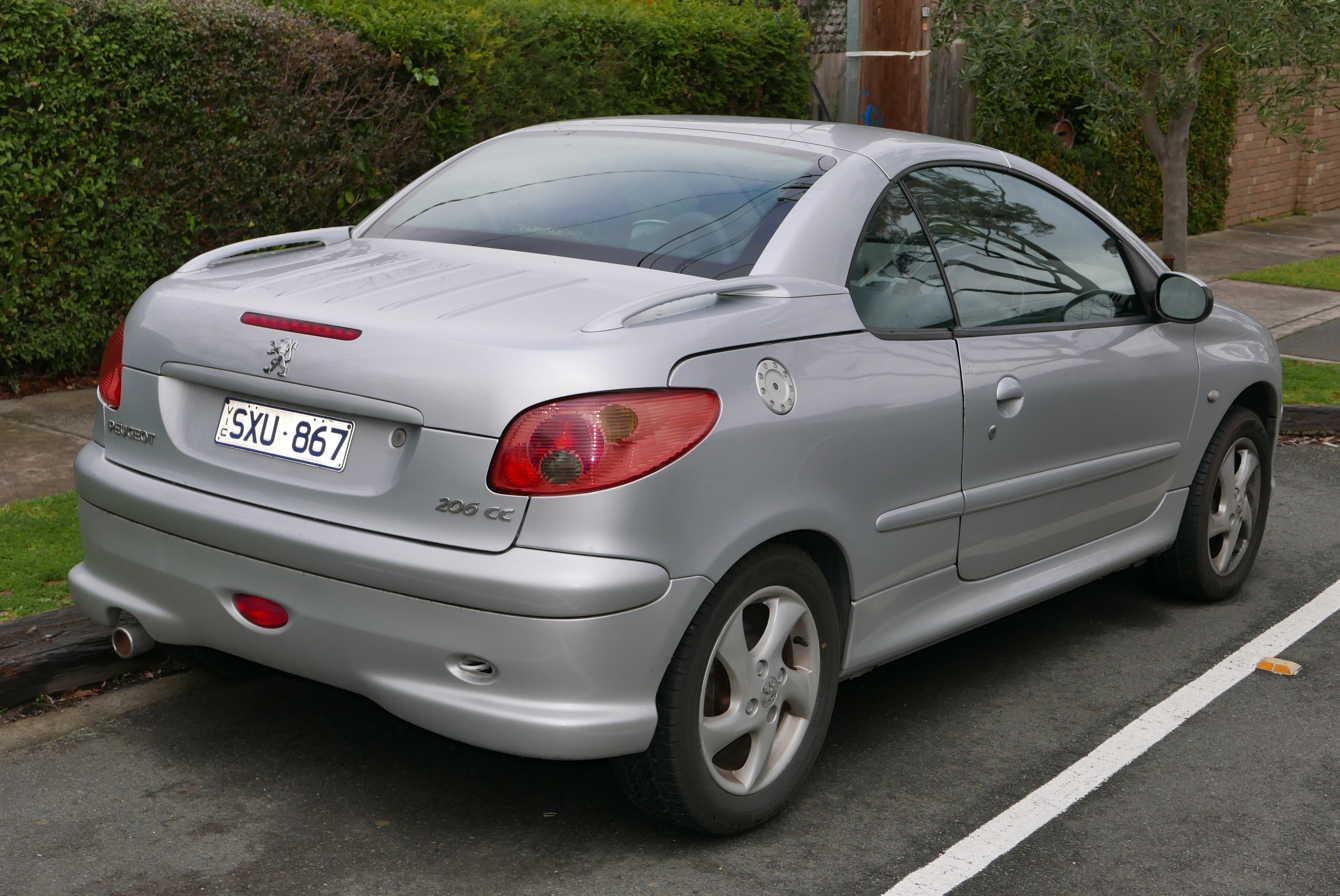
Peugeot 206 CC

After graduation he worked at Ford in Germany for two years and then moved to Mercedes-Benz for 8 years. Günak moved to Peugeot to become Head of Design in 1994 and then returned to Mercedes-Benz and DaimlerChrysler in 1998 as Vice President for all passenger cars.

He joined the Volkswagen brand as Head of Design in April 2003 and took over as Head of Design of the Volkswagen Group on 1 January 2004, responsible for the design activities of all brands in the Group. He was replaced at Volkswagen by his former employee, Walter de'Silva in 2007.

Through his consultant company MGMO GmbH, he was CEO of Mindset AG between July 2008 and January 2009.

He moved to a new electric vehicle project called "Mia electric" in France, which was produced between 2011 and 2013. Günak then moved to Tretbox, now Ono, to develop further electric vehicle designs.

After 2018, Murat Günak worked with Togg to design the Togg T10X with the contribution of Pininfarina.].

== Car designs ==
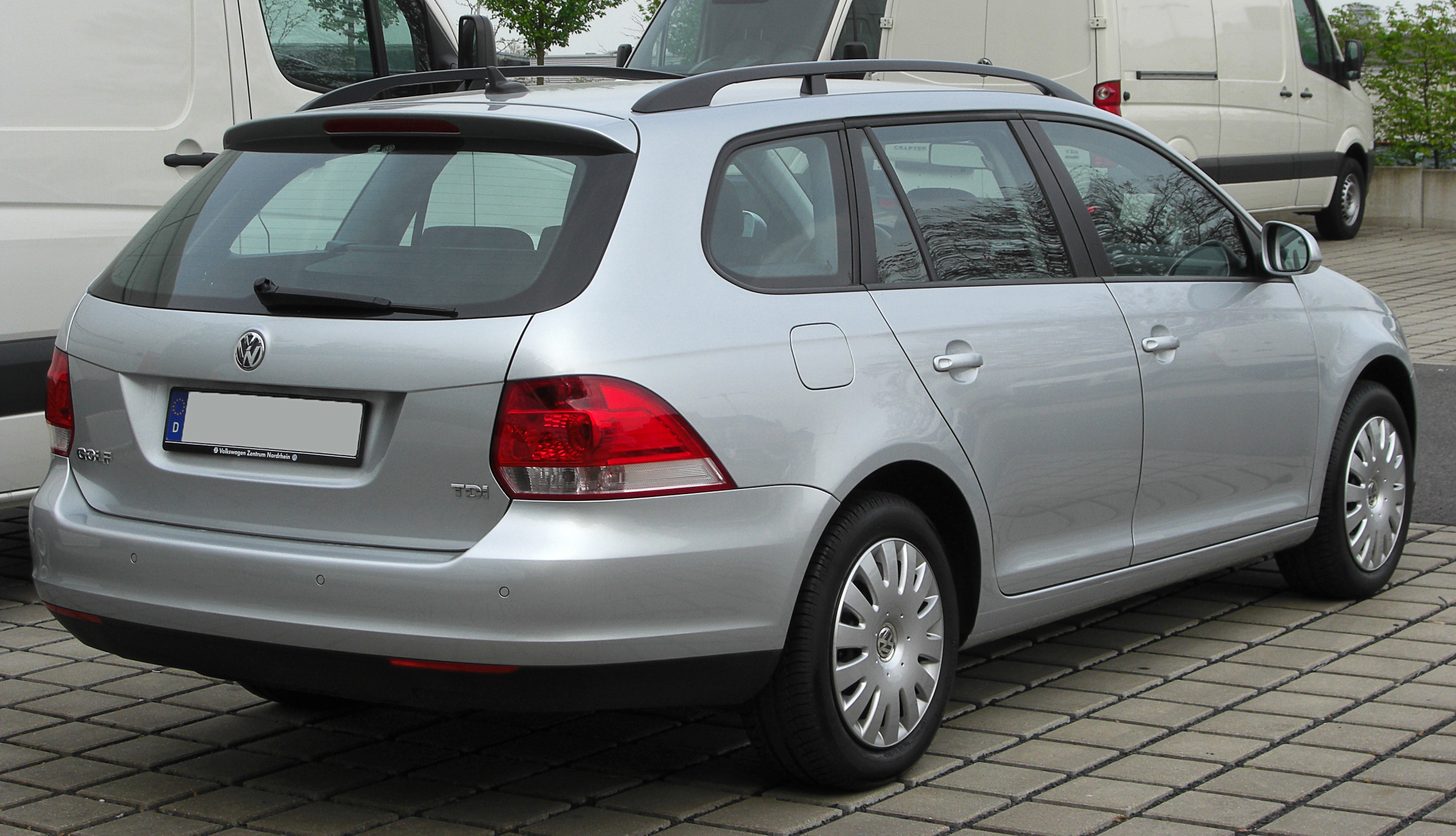
Volkswagen Golf V Variant

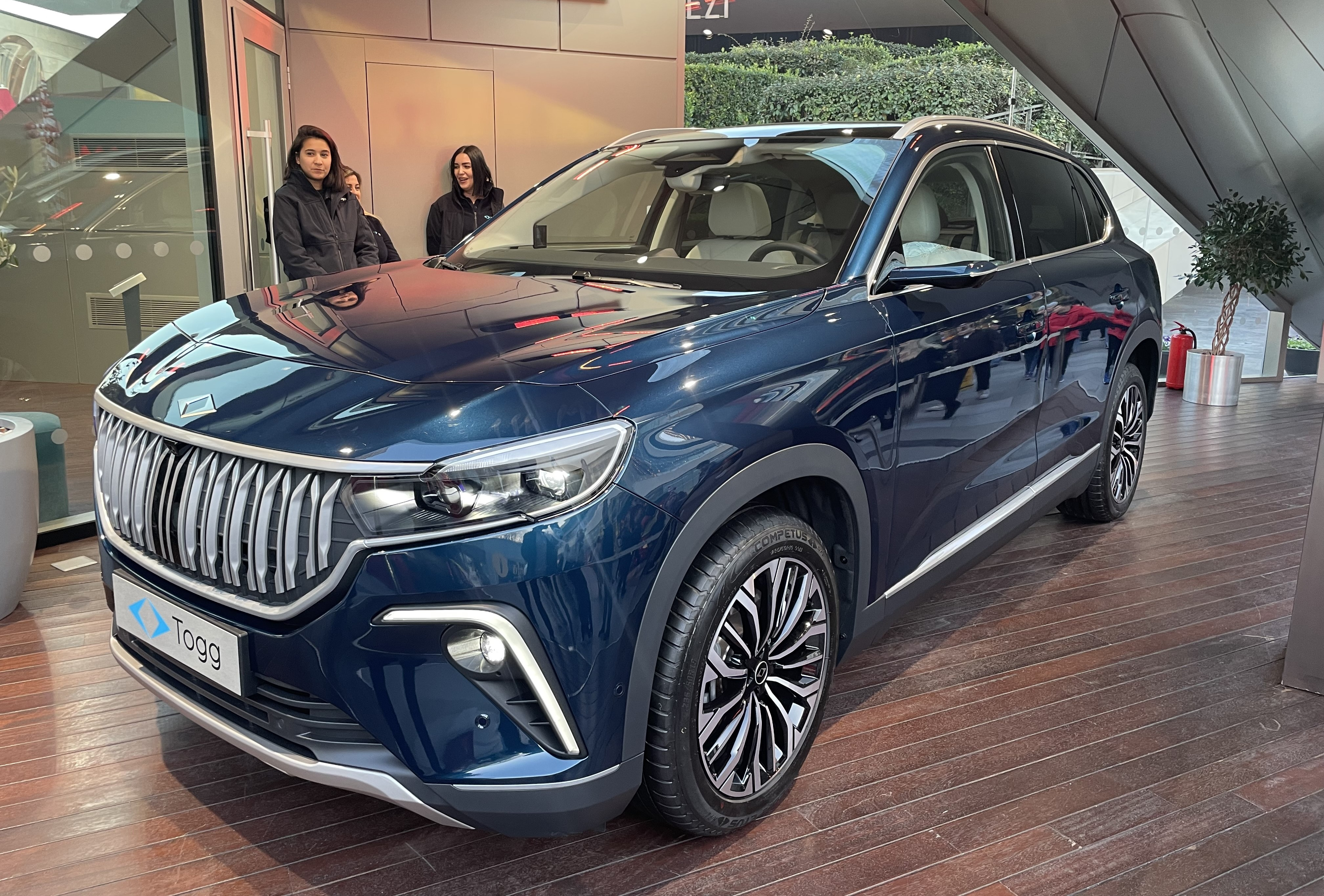
2022 Togg T10X

- Mercedes-Benz C-Class (W202)
- Mercedes-Benz SLK-Class (R170)
- Peugeot 206 CC
- Peugeot 307
- Peugeot 607
- Volkswagen Passat CC
- Volkswagen Scirocco III
- Volkswagen Golf V Variant (station wagon)
- Mia electric
- Togg T10X
- Togg T10F
