= Mia electric =

French electric vehicle maker active 2011–2013

Mia Electric
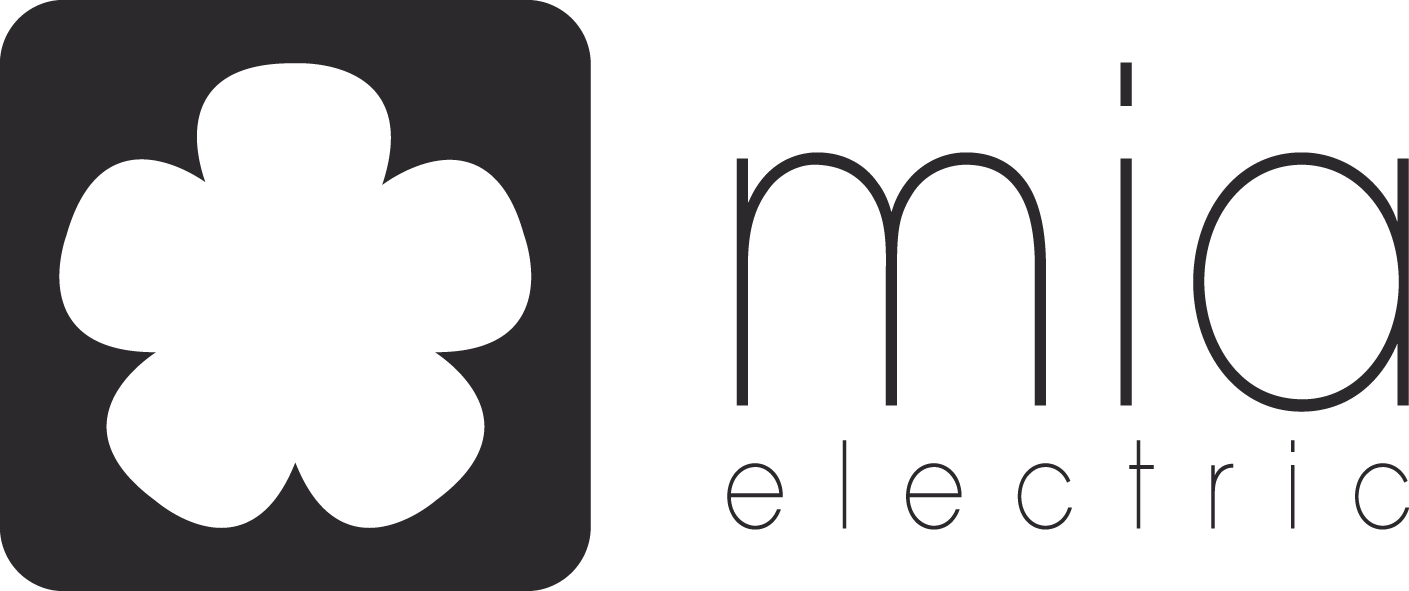

Overview
- Manufacturer: Mia Electric
- Also called: Heuliez Friendly, Fox E-Mobility MIA 2.0
- Production: June 2011–December 2013
- Assembly: Cerizay, France
- Designer: Murat Günak

Body and chassis
- Body style: 3-door hatchback & van

Powertrain
- Battery: 8 & 12 kWh

Dimensions
- Wheelbase: 1,806 mm (71.1 in)
- Length: 2,870 mm (113.0 in) (3-seater); 3,190 mm (125.6 in) (L and van)
- Width: 1,640 mm (64.6 in)
- Height: 1,550 mm (61.0 in)
- Curb weight: 765–786 kg (1,687–1,733 lb) (8 kWh); 815–836 kg (1,797–1,843 lb) (12 kWh)

Mia Electric was a French electric car manufacturer in the 2010s. The company, based in Cerizay, France, designed and built electric vehicles made totally in France.

The Mia was the company's first all-electric model on the market. The car has a 9.7 kW (13 hp) electric motor with an 8 kWh [[lithium iron phosphate battery|lithium iron phosphate (LiFePO_{4} or LFP) battery pack]] that delivers a range of 90 km (56 mi), and a maximum speed of 100 km/h (62 mph).

Production began in June 2011, and sales to the public started in 2012. Production stopped in December 2013 due to financial problems. The Tribunal de Commerce de Niort placed the company in judicial liquidation in March 2014.

== Specifications and models ==
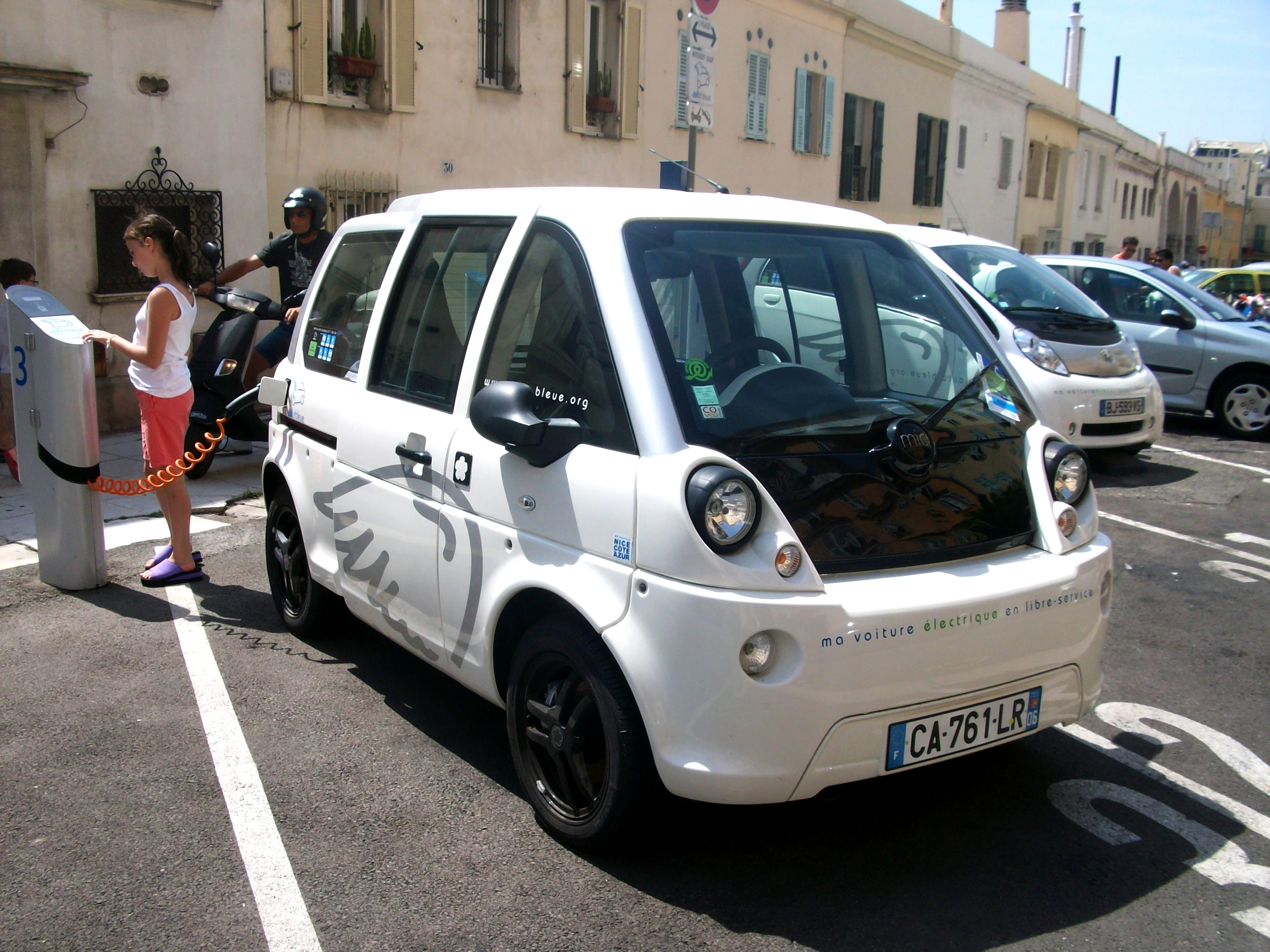
Mia in Nice

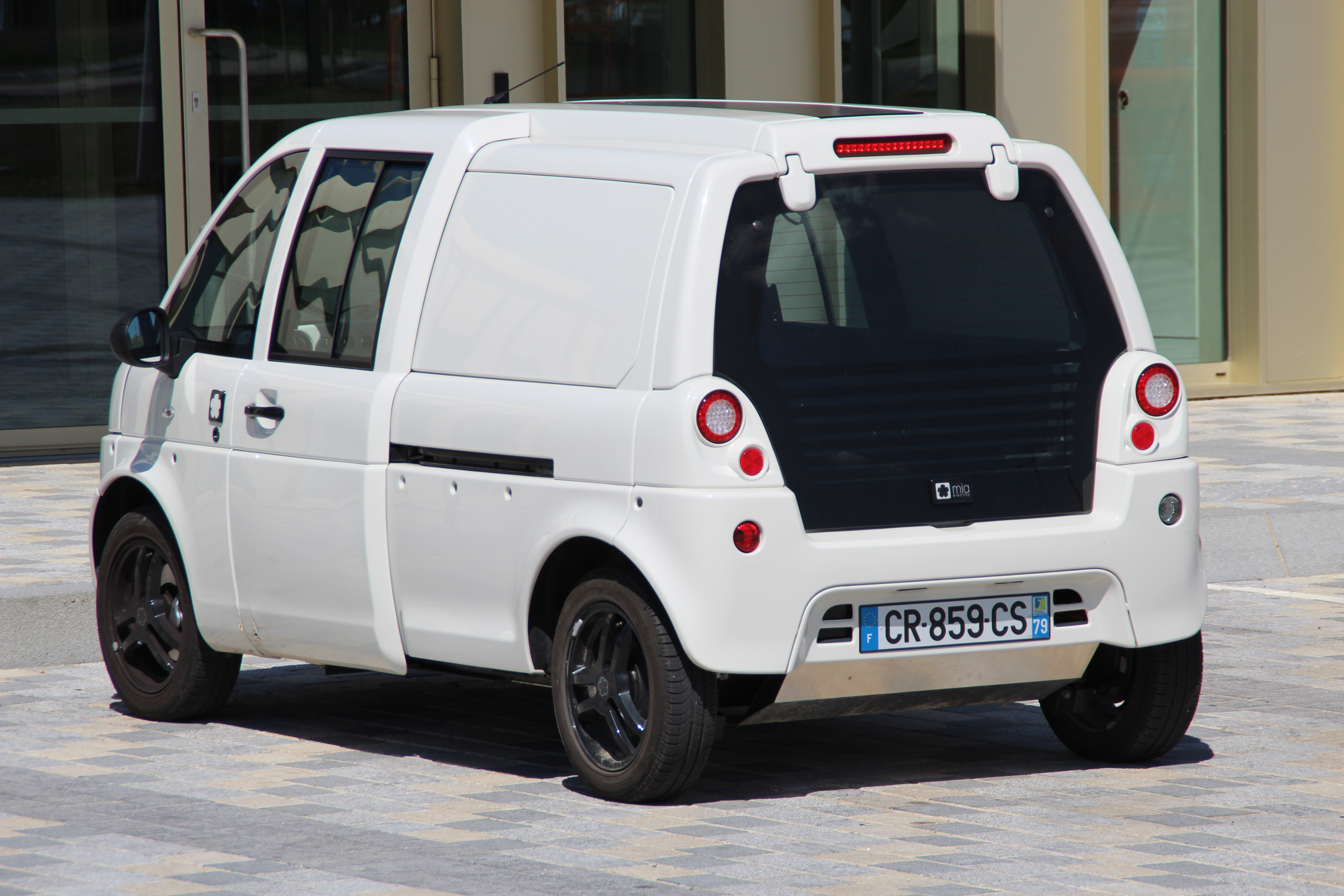
Mia U in Saclay, France

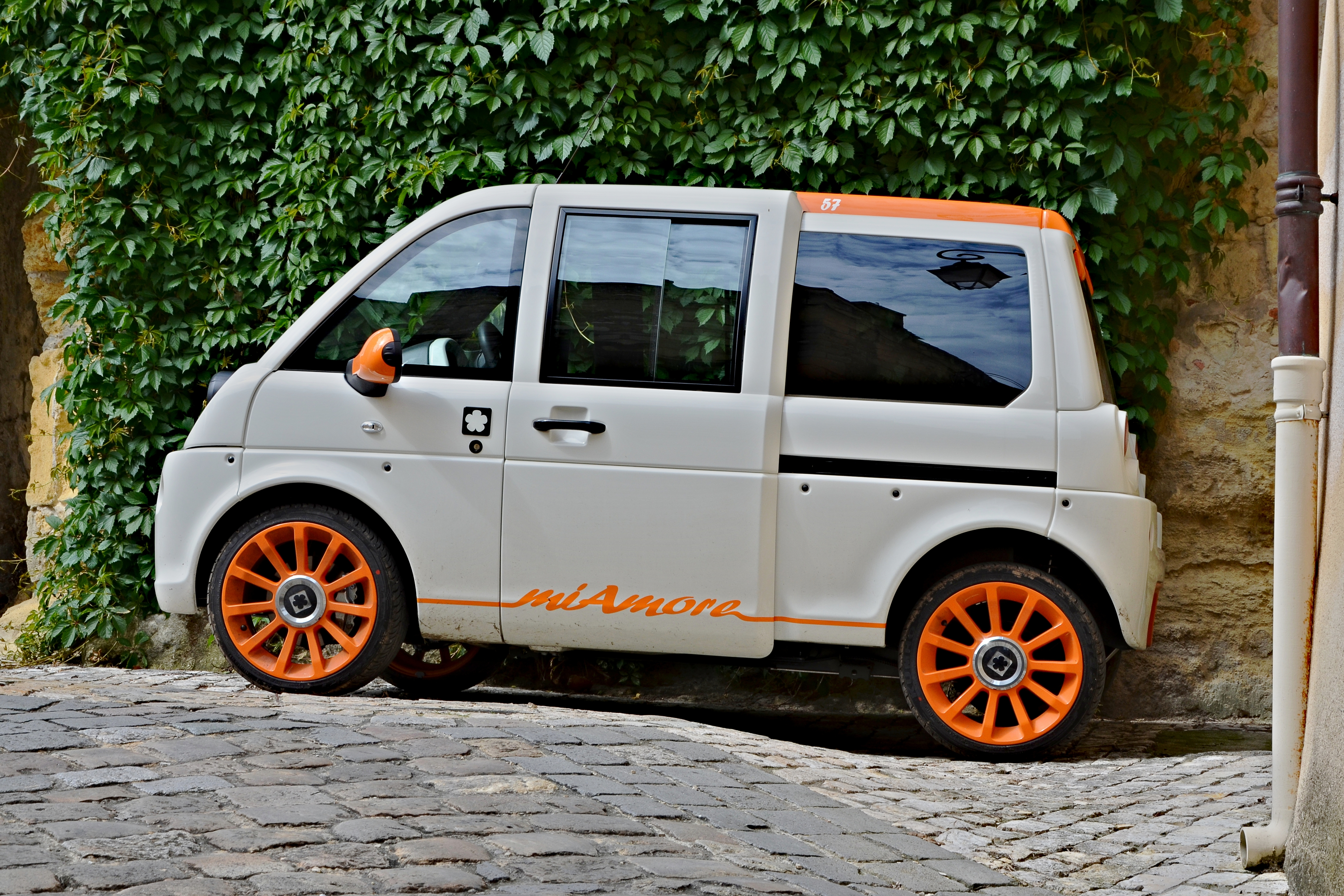
Mia L "miAmore" special edition in Gironde, France

Mia electric is offered in three trims:

- Mia,
- Mia L,
- Mia U (formerly Mia K)

All versions have two battery options, as the standard 8 kWh battery can be replaced by a larger 12 kWh battery, allowing an increase in range from 80 to 90 km (50 to 56 mi) to 120 to 130 km (75 to 81 mi). The battery pack has a 3-year warranty period. Maximum range figures are based on the NEDC test procedures and may be less in cold weather or if the vehicle is loaded. All models have a top speed of 100 km/h (62 mph).

The short Mia is a three-seater, measuring 2.87 m (9 ft 5 in), with two sliding doors and the driver seat located in the center. The price starts at €12,255 (US$16,532) excluding VAT and government purchase assistance for low carbon vehicles. The Mia L has four seats and a longer wheelbase measuring 3.19 m (10.5 ft), and pricing starts at €12,781 (US$17,241). The Mia U is a box van with only the driver's seat and also has a length of 3.19 m (10.5 ft), and pricing starts at €11,730 (US$15,823). The cargo capacity of the Mia U is over 1,500 litres (330 imp gal; 400 US gal). All three models comply with the European safety standards for passenger vehicles, and therefore are considered highway-capable. In addition to a central airbag for the driver and seats with three-point safety belts, the standard equipment for the Mia includes an Anti-lock braking system (ABS) and emergency brake assist (EBA).

== Production and sales ==
Mia Electric was formed from Heuliez and with private investment and the French Government totalling €30 million and took on the development of the Heuliez Friendly which had been initially unveiled in 2008.

The construction plant, which was entirely re-equipped in 2010, conformed to the most demanding aspects of current legislation with Certification to ISO 9001 and 14001 standards. Mia electric had its own design studio with 16 designers working with an R&D department of no less than 80 engineers.

The Mia pre-production version was introduced at the March 2011 Geneva Motor Show. The production version was showcased at the September 2011 Frankfurt Motor Show.

The Mia range was sold through a distribution network which specialised in electric mobility in France and internationally, including Germany, Belgium, Netherlands, United Kingdom, Luxembourg, Norway, Czech Republic, Canada, Italy, Switzerland, Ile de la Réunion, New Caledonia, and South Africa. Mia electric had as its target global availability of the Mia brand with strategic partnerships around the world. Production began in June 2011 and sales were limited to fleet customers in France and Germany. Retail sales to the general public started in 2012. A total of 660 passenger cars and 123 units of the Mia U box van were sold in Europe through October 2012. France was the leading market with 843 units registered from 2011 through January 2014.

Production stopped in December 2013 due to financial problems. The company was put under receivership in February 2014. The Tribunal de Commerce de Niort placed the company in judicial liquidation in March 2014.

== Fox E-Mobility MIA 2.0 ==
In 2020, the Mia electric minivan was updated by Fox Automotive Switzerland AG, as the Fox E-Mobility MIA 2.0, with the company expecting the vehicle to be on sale in Europe around 2023.

== See also ==
- Electric car use by country
- Government incentives for plug-in electric vehicles
- List of modern production plug-in electric vehicles
- List of production battery electric vehicles
