= Mindset (vehicle) =

Mindset AG was a Switzerland-based start-up firm founded in July 2007. It developed the Mindset E-Motion plug-in hybrid car, that should have a range of 100 kilometres (62 mi) on a charge or 800 kilometres (500 mi) with backup gasoline engine.

From the company's foundation to January 2009, Murat Günak, former head of design for Volkswagen, was the CEO and designer through his consultant company MGMO GmbH. The firm was not a success, and was dissolved on 28 August 2012

== Mindset E-Motion ==
Designed by Murat Guenak, the car features gullwing doors and semi-open 22" wheels. Built on an aluminum spaceframe and plastic body, the car is 4.2m long and a low kerb weight of 800kg.

The E-Motion's powertrain is a range extender format similar to the BMW i3 and consists of a 70kW electric motor and lithium-ion battery that can drive the car up to 100km on a single charge. The battery is recharged by a small 18kW petrol engine. The roof-mounted solar panel can also top up the batteries.

The company had ambitions to sell up to 10,000 units annually from 2009, priced at €50,000.

== See also ==
- Twike
