= Maguari =

Maguari or Maguary may refer to:

== Nature ==
- Maguari stork, wetland bird from South America
- Maguari virus, virus from South America

== Sports ==
- Associação Atlética Maguary, Brazilian football club from Bonito, Pernambuco
- Sport Club Maguary, Brazilian football club from Fortaleza, Ceará

== Other ==
- Hispano-Suiza Maguari, 2019 sports car named after the stork
