= Volkswagen Touran =

Compact MPV

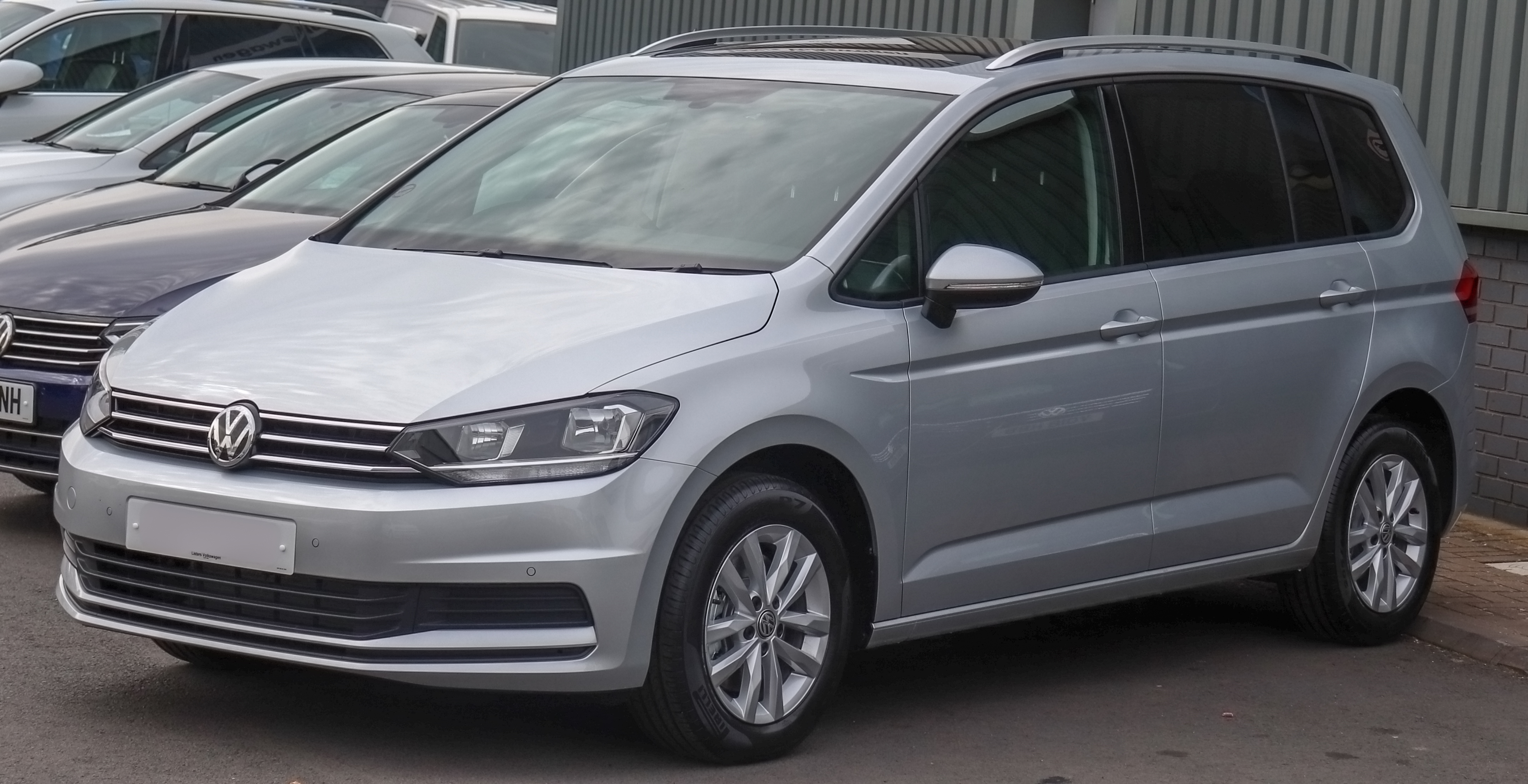

Overview
- Manufacturer: Volkswagen
- Also called: Volkswagen Golf Touran (Japan)
- Production: December 2002 – April 2026; 2004 – present (China)

Body and chassis
- Class: Compact MPV (M)
- Body style: 5-door MPV
- Layout: Front-engine, front-wheel-drive

The Volkswagen Touran is a compact multi-purpose vehicle (MPV) manufactured by German automaker Volkswagen since 2003, and sold in Europe and other select markets. It filled a gap in Volkswagen's model lineup between the Volkswagen Golf, with which it shares its platform, and its larger counterpart, the Volkswagen Sharan, which ceased production in 2022. The Touran has been sold in Japan as the Golf Touran and the crossover-styled variant as the CrossTouran. The name "Touran" is a portmanteau of "Tour" and "Sharan". Despite the similarity of their names, the Touran is not related to the North American market Volkswagen Routan. The vehicle is delivered in five or seven seat versions.

== First generation (Typ 1T; 2003) ==
First generation
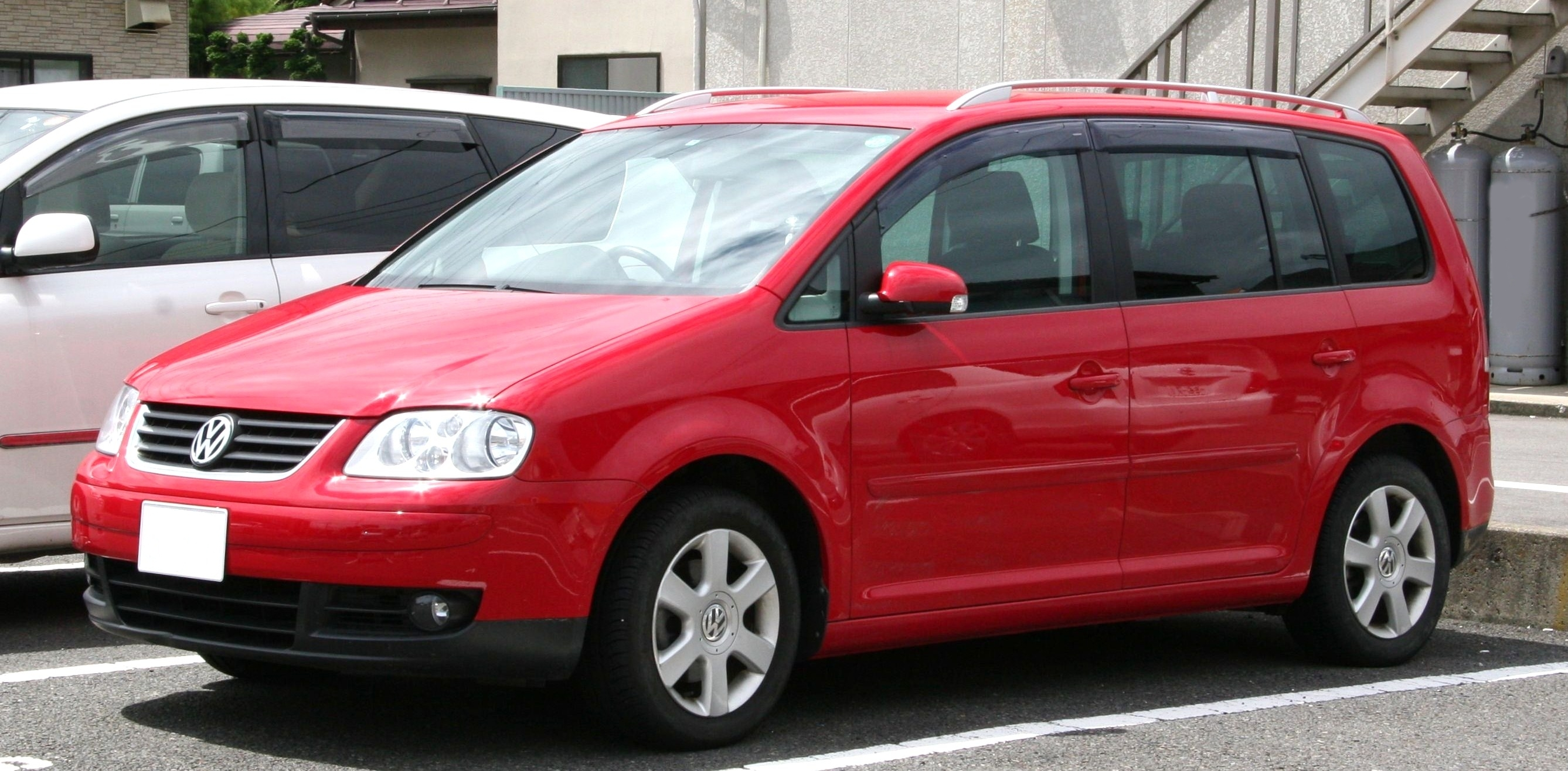

Overview
- Model code: 1T
- Production: December 2002–2016
- Assembly: Germany: Wolfsburg; China: Anting (SAIC-VW); Indonesia: Jakarta (National Assemblers)
- Designer: Erwin Leo Himmel

Body and chassis
- Platform: Volkswagen Group A5 (PQ35)
- Related: Volkswagen Golf Mk5; Volkswagen Golf Mk6; Volkswagen Golf Plus; Volkswagen Caddy Mk3

Powertrain
- Engine: Petrol and CNG engines 1.2 L I4 TSI (2010–2015); 1.4 L I4 TSI (2007–2015); 1.4 L I4 TSI EcoFuel (2009–2015); 1.6 L I4 (2003–2010); 1.6 L I4 FSI (2003–2006); 1.8 L I4 20V Turbo (2005–2008; China); 2.0 L I4 8V (China); 2.0 L I4 FSI (2003–2006); 2.0 L I4 EcoFuel (2006–2009); Diesel engines 1.6 L I4 TDI (2010–2015); 1.9 L I4 TDI (2003–2010); 2.0 L I4 TDI (2003–2015)
- Transmission: 5-speed manual 6-speed manual 6/7 speed DSG

Dimensions
- Wheelbase: 2,680 mm (105.5 in)
- Length: 2003–2006: 4,389 mm (172.8 in); 2006–2010: 4,409 mm (173.6 in); 2010–2015: 4,397 mm (173.1 in)
- Width: 2003–2006: 1,791 mm (70.5 in); 2006–2010: 1,791 mm (70.5 in); 2010–2015: 1,793 mm (70.6 in)
- Height: 2003–2006: 1,651 mm (65.0 in); 2006–2010: 1,641 mm (64.6 in); 2010–2015: 1,674 mm (65.9 in)

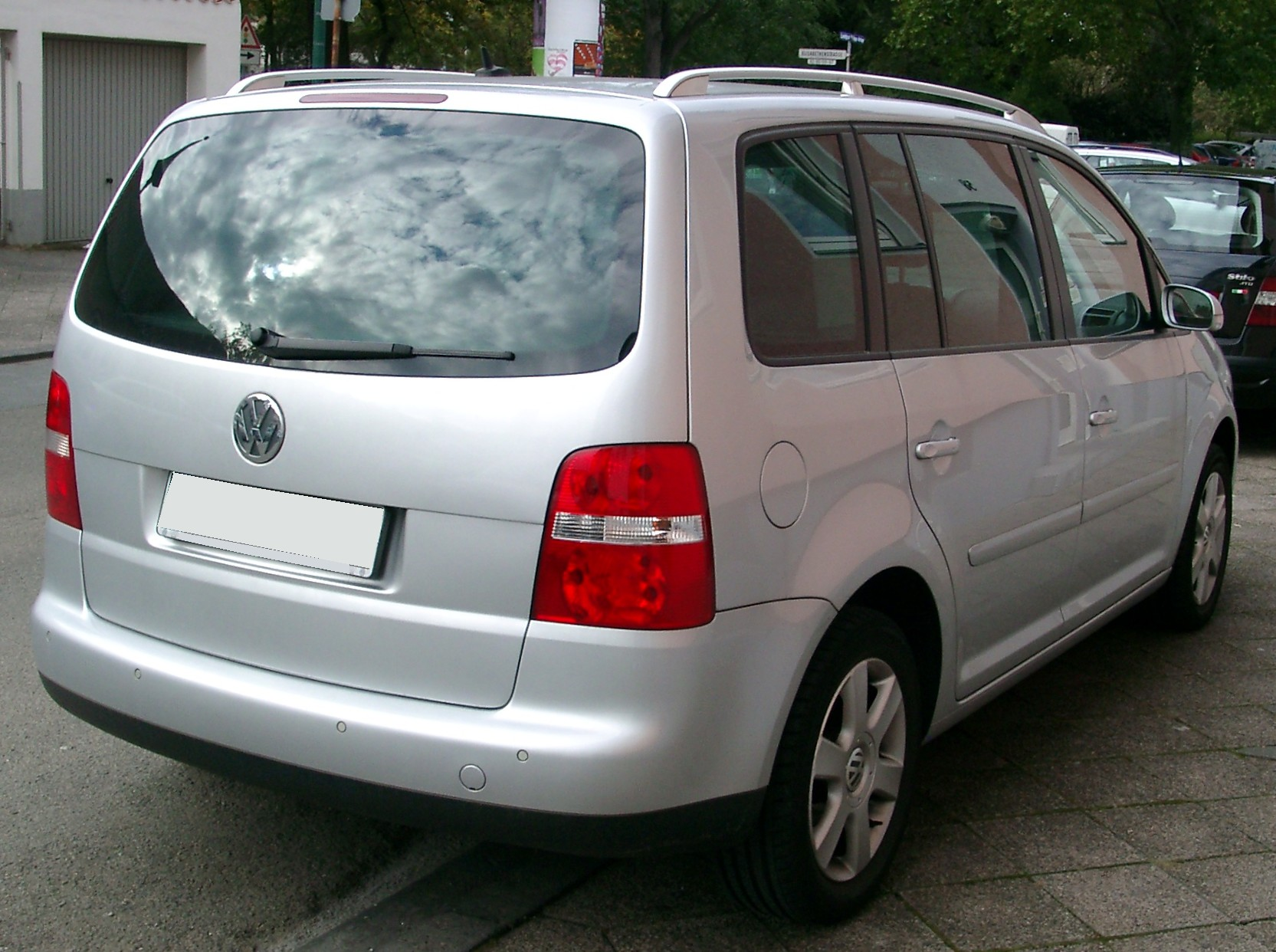
Pre-facelift Volkswagen Touran

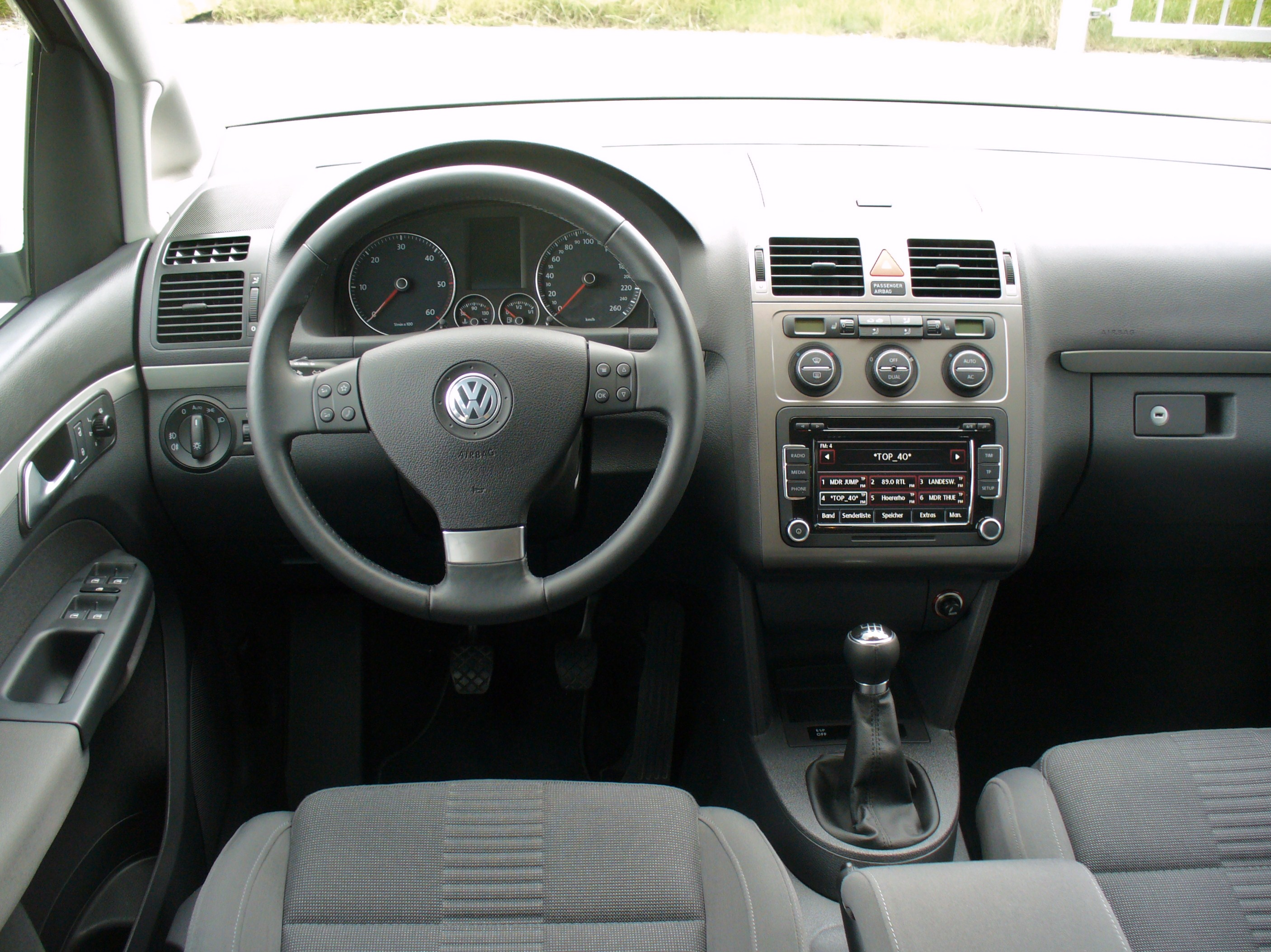
Interior

Announced back in August 2002, the Touran, whose production started in December 2002 and sales commenced in 2003, is the first Volkswagen MPV based on a Golf platform, more precisely the first vehicle on PQ35 platform rather than PQ34. It joined Volkswagen's existing MPV line up that included the Sharan and Caravelle (Volkswagen Bus).

Volkswagen explained the name Touran was created from the word "Tour", i.e. to travel, with the addition of the end syllable from its big brother Sharan.

The Touran II can be considered an extended version of the Volkswagen Golf Sportsvan and the Touran I of Golf Plus, since their front ends are similar in size. The rear overhang of the Touran I was 200 mm (7.87 in) longer (and therefore a seven-seater, while the Golf Plus is a five seater). The Touran II is about 13 cm longer than Touran I.

The Touran introduced electro-mechanical steering, a first in its class and for Volkswagen. It is able to vary the weight of the steering depending on the road speed. Due to the lack of energy consumption in idle it also improves the overall efficiency of the vehicle. The Touran was the first vehicle to use Volkswagen's 2.0 TDI engine.

The engines available at the launch included a 1.6 FSI and two diesel engines, the 1.9 TDI with 74 kW (101 PS; 99 hp) and the 2.0 TDI 103 kW (140 PS; 138 hp). The engines are EURO 4 compliant, except the 1.9 TDi when paired with the DSG (direct shift gearbox). The Touran launched with a six speed manual gearbox as standard, and a DSG for the 1.9 TDI Engines.

=== Safety ===
The initial test of the Touran in 2003, resulted in a four star rating for adult protection. Volkswagen made slight changes to the Touran from November 2003, adding "an intelligent reminder for the driver and front passenger to buckle their seat belts." This allowed the Touran to be retested the same year, scoring a single extra point, and so giving the car a five star rating for adult protection:

Euro NCAP test results* LHD, small MPV (2003)
Test	Score	Rating
Adult occupant:	33	5 /5 stars
Pedestrian:	19	3 /4 stars

=== Facelift (2006) ===
The Touran received a facelift for the October 2006 Paris Motor Show.

The facelift introduced redesigned headlights with chrome accents, a refreshed grille, and a reworked front bumper featuring a broader lower intake. At the rear, the taillights were subtly revised while retaining their original outline. Inside, the cabin could accommodate up to seven occupants, though the third row was best suited for children due to limited space. Both rear rows folded flat to expand cargo capacity, but none of the seats were removable. Safety improvements included curtain airbags for the first two rows, alongside standard front and side airbags, plus Isofix mounts on the second row. Volkswagen also added its ParkAssist system, which could automatically steer the vehicle during parking.

Engine options varied by market, with a wide selection of petrol and diesel units, and a compressed natural gas version offered in certain countries.

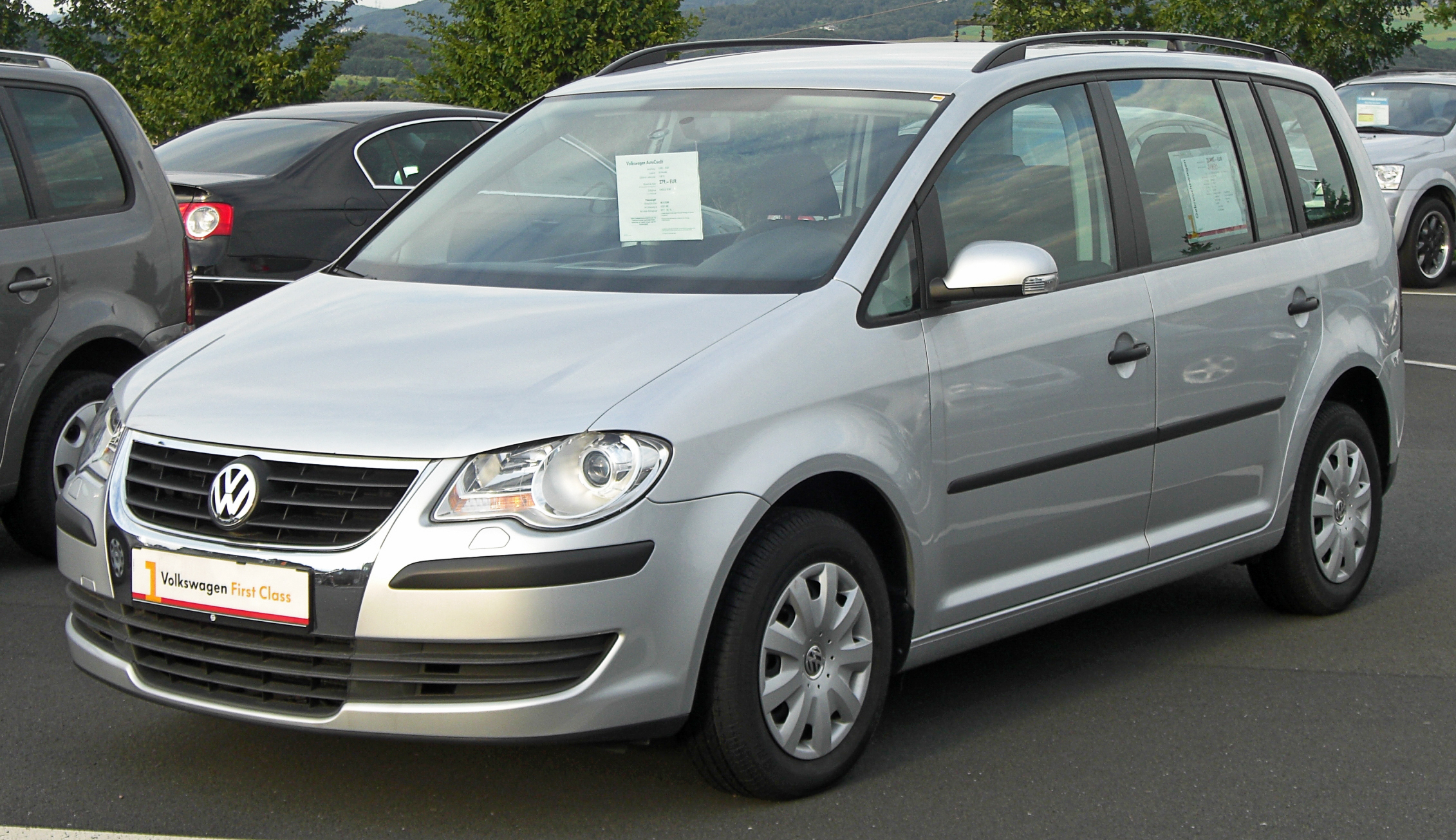
2006 facelift (front)

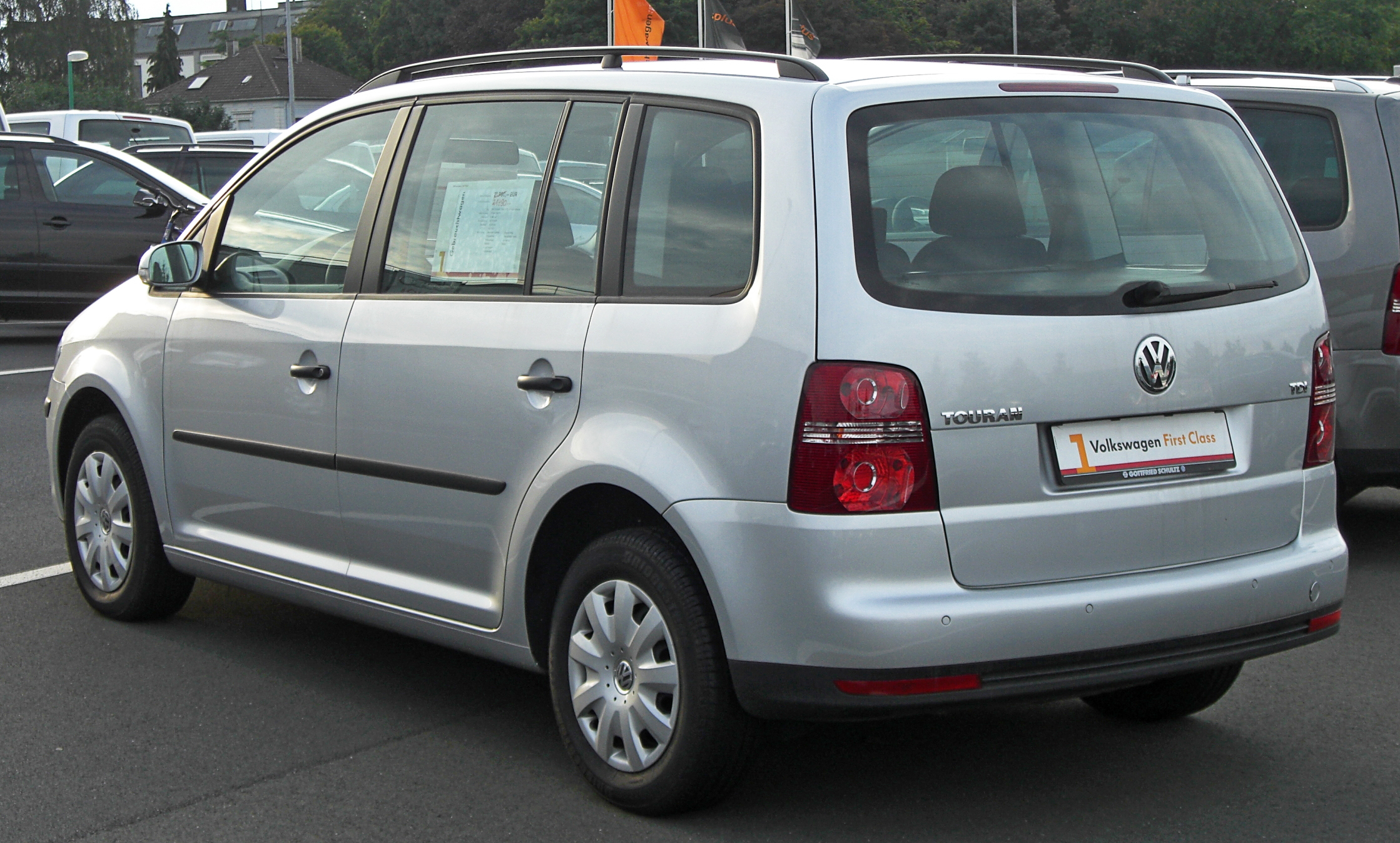
2006 facelift (rear)

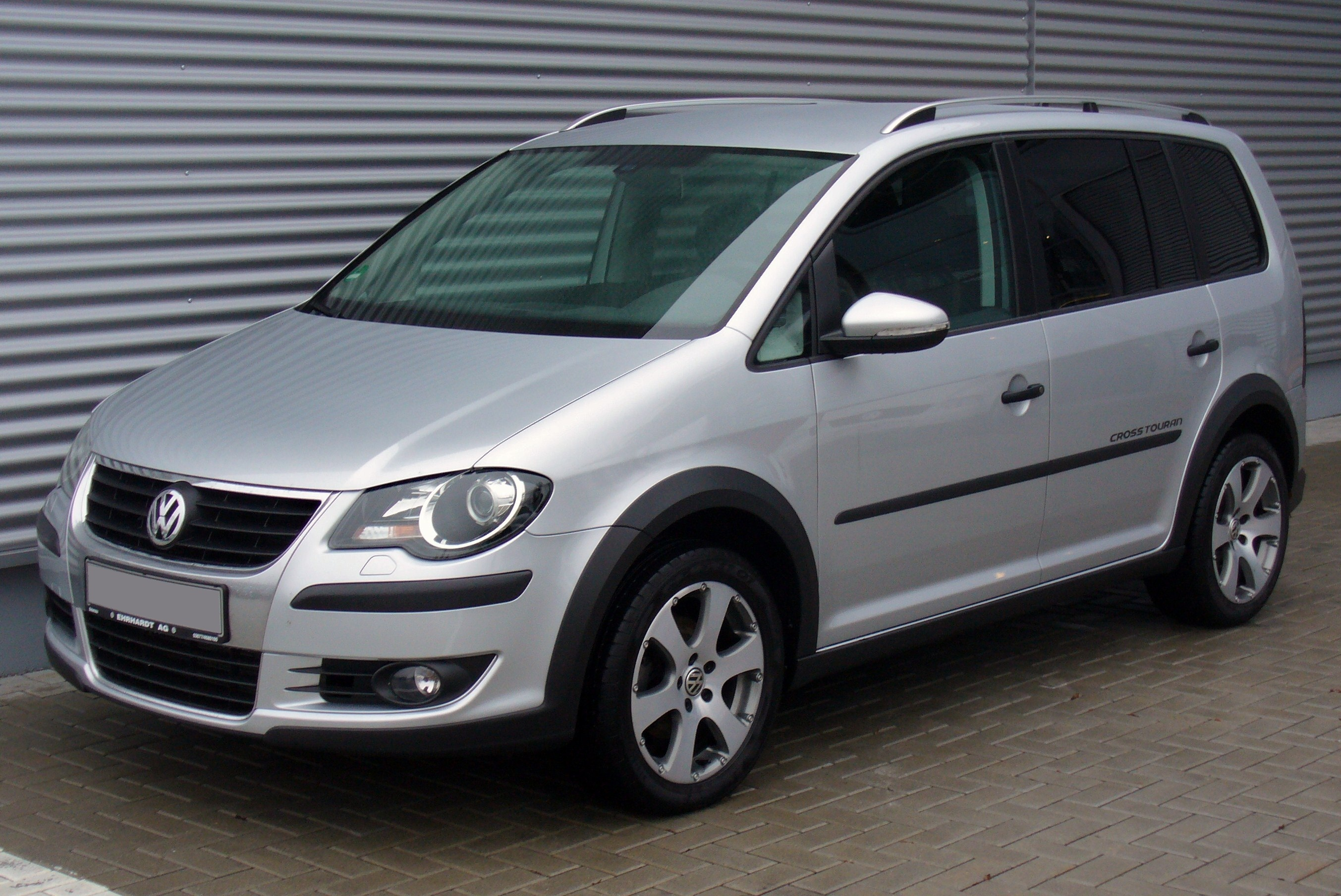
CrossTouran (2006 facelift)

==== Park Assist ====
The 2007 model year Touran was the first production vehicle in the Volkswagen Group to be released with the new Park Assist technology. Park Assist helps the driver parallel park the vehicle. Firstly, after having activated the feature and whilst travelling up to 30 km/h Park Assist uses sensors to attempt to identify a suitable parking spot (defined as 0.8 metres longer than the length of the vehicle).

The driver then stops ahead of the parking spot, releases the steering wheel, but continues working the gears, accelerator and brake pedal as advised by the display panels, as the Park Assist controls the steering to park the vehicle.

==== CrossTouran ====
At the December 2006 Bologna Motor Show, Volkswagen released the third Cross vehicle designed by Volkswagen Individual GmbH.

The CrossTouran is distinguished from a standard Touran by its 17-inch alloy wheels, redesigned plastic guards which ape a crossover vehicle, and a 15 mm (0.59 in) higher suspension/chassis setup that is optional for standard Tourans in Europe.

All CrossTouran engines are EU4 compliant.

Petrol engines

- 1.6 MPI with 75 kW / 102 hp
- 1.4 TSI with 103 kW / 140 hp
- 2.0 TSI with 125 kW / 170 hp

Diesel engines

- 1.9 TDI with 77 kW / 105 hp
- 2.0 TDI with 103 kW / 140 hp
- 2.0 TDI with 125 kW / 170 hp

=== Second facelift (2010) ===
When the vehicle was released to the markets in August 2010, the Touran was updated to the newer Golf VI looks. This included as new features compared to the previous generation the option for DCC (Volkswagen's adaptive suspension system), Light-Assist for Xenon Headlights, an improved Park-Assist System that can also handle perpendicular park positions and updated infotainment systems. The aerodynamics of the car were also improved, the Cw improved from 0,315 to 0,307.

In late 2010, SAIC-VW released the new Touran in China. Though its front was updated to the German style, the tail keeps the design of the first face-lifted model. The electronic systems of this domestically produced car were upgraded as its relative in Europe. A 1.4 TSI, which can output 93 kW, was added to the new model.

New engines were available following the downsizing trend, a 1.2 with 77 kW (105 PS; 103 hp) and a new 1.6 TDI with 66 kW (90 PS; 89 hp) or 77 kW (105 PS; 103 hp). They replaced the 1.6 and 1.9 TDI from the previous model. The 1.2, 77 kW (105 PS; 103 hp) and 1.6 TDI 77 kW (105 PS; 103 hp) were also available as BlueMotion, Volkswagen's low fuel consumption vehicle program.

In 2012, the 125 kW (170 PS; 168 hp) engine was replaced with the 130 kW (177 PS; 174 hp).

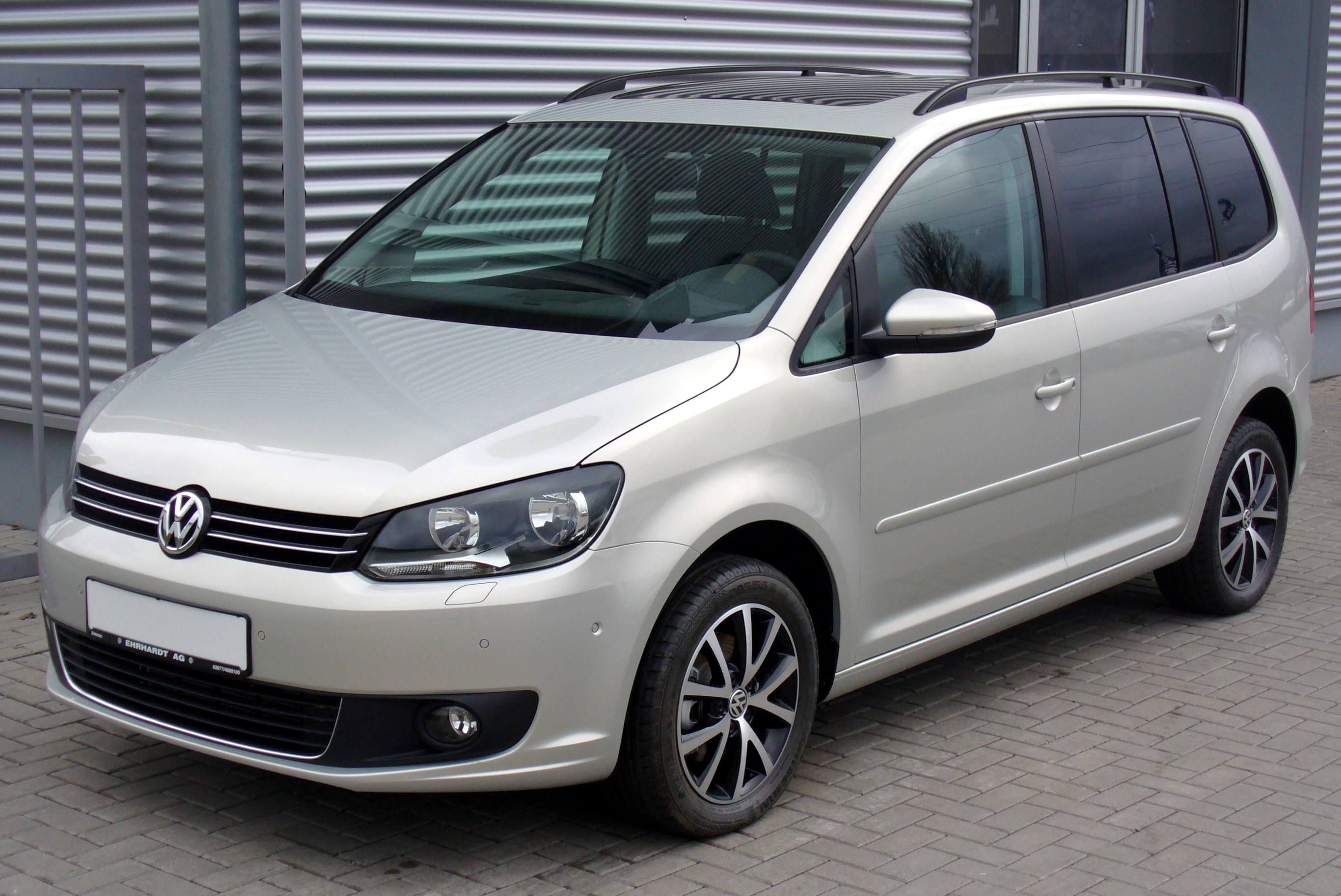
2010 facelift

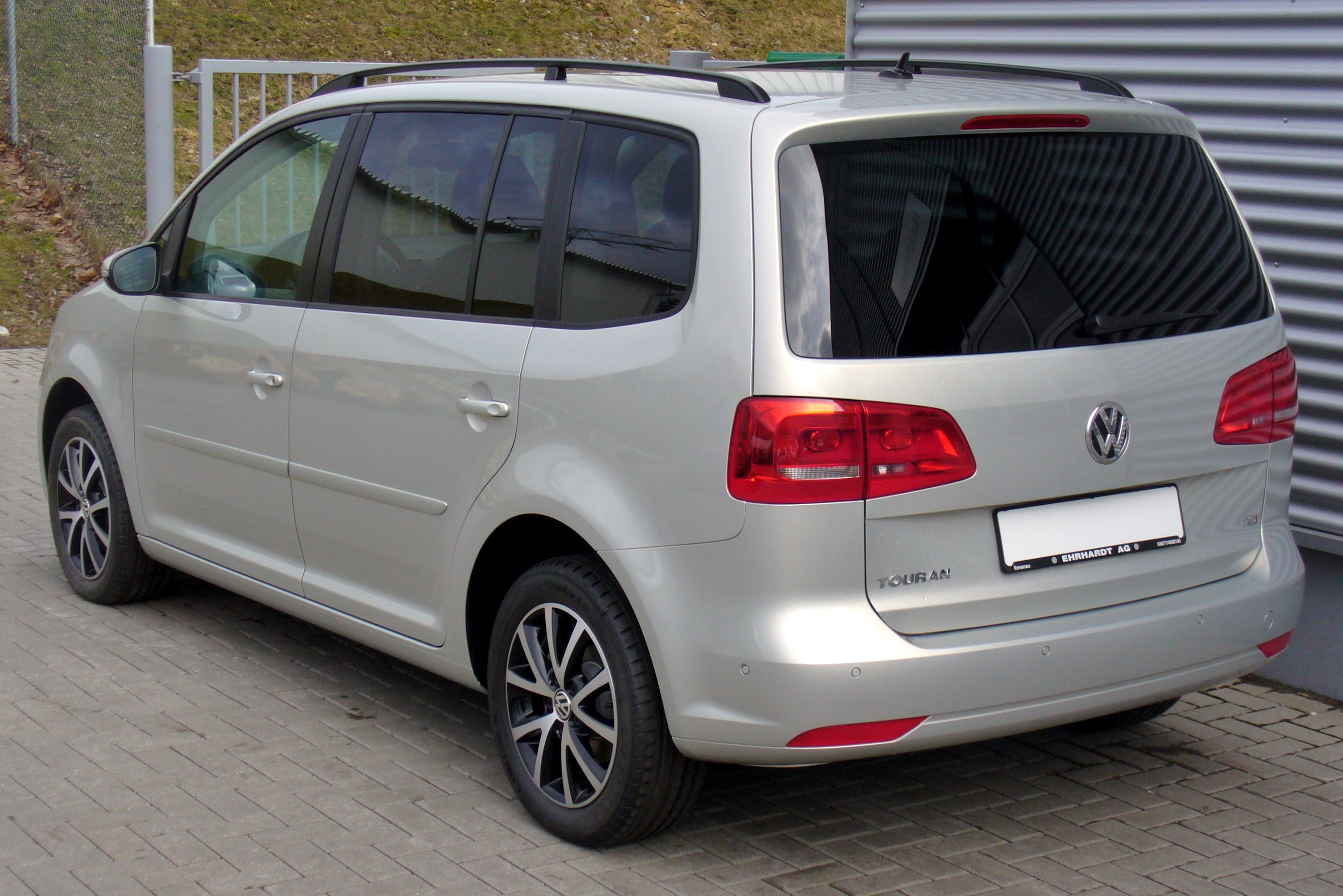
2010 facelift

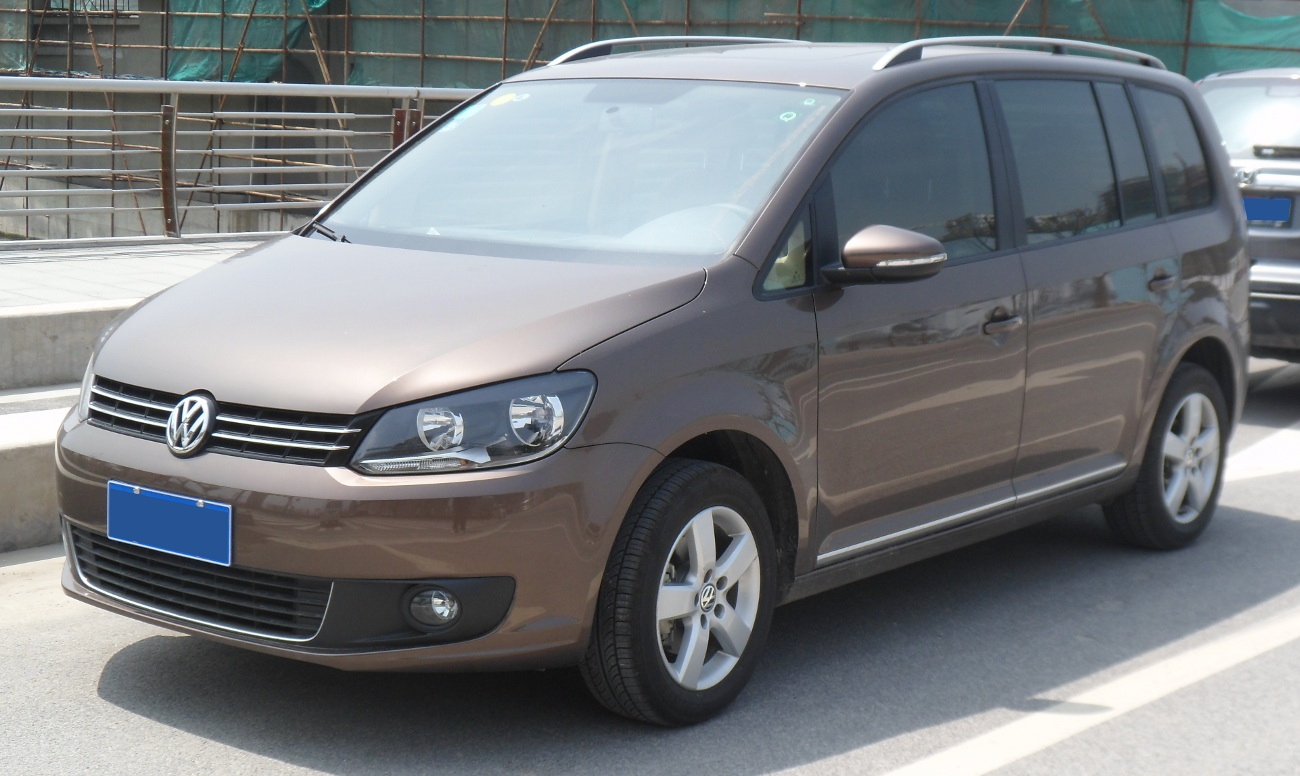
2010 facelift (China)

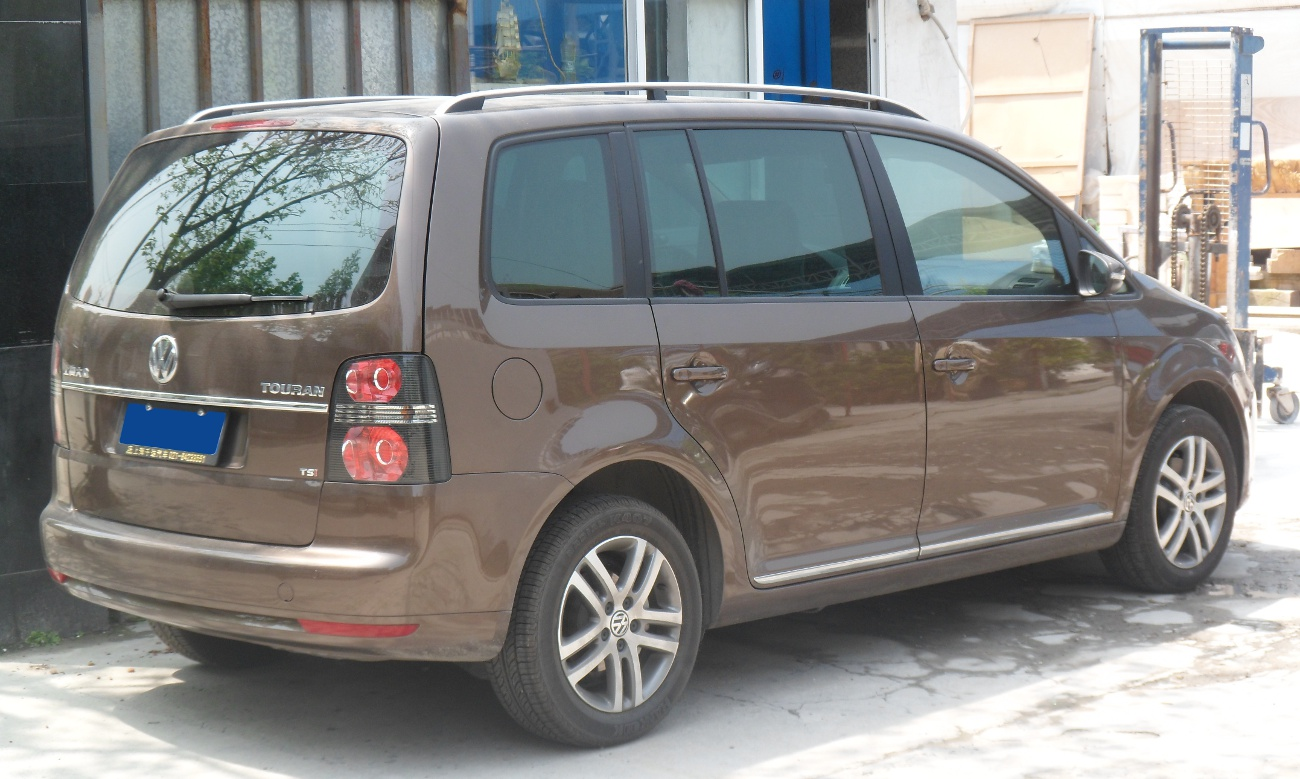
2010 facelift (China)

=== Engines ===
The Touran is available with petrol, diesel and compressed natural gas (CNG) engines.

Model	Years	Engine and code		Displ.	Power	Torque
1.2 TSI	2010–2015	I4 8V	CBZB	1,197 cc	77 kW (105 PS; 103 hp) @ 5,000 rpm	175 N⋅m (129 lb⋅ft) @ 1,550-4,100 rpm
1.4 TSI	2006–2010	I4 16V	BMY/CAVC	1,390 cc	103 kW (140 PS; 138 hp) @ 5,600 rpm	220 N⋅m (162 lb⋅ft) @ 1,250–4,000 rpm
1.4 TSI	2007–2015	I4 16V	BLG/CAVB	1,390 cc	125 kW (170 PS; 168 hp) @ 6,000 rpm	240 N⋅m (177 lb⋅ft) @ 1,500 rpm–4,500 rpm
1.4 TSI EcoFuel	2009–2015	I4 16V	CDGA	1390 cc	110 kW (150 PS; 148 hp) @ 5,500 rpm	220 N⋅m (162 lb⋅ft) @ 1,500–4,500 rpm
1.6 R4	2003–2010	I4 8V	BGU/BSE/BSF	1,595 cc	75 kW (102 PS; 101 hp) @ 5,600 rpm	148 N⋅m (109 lb⋅ft) @ 3,800 rpm
1.6 FSI	2003–2006	I4 16V	BAG/BLF/BLP	1,598 cc	85 kW (116 PS; 114 hp) @ 6,000 rpm	155 N⋅m (114 lb⋅ft) @ 4,000 rpm
2.0 FSI	2003–2006	I4 16V	AXW/BLR/BLX/BVY	1,984 cc	110 kW (150 PS; 148 hp) @ 6,000 rpm	200 N⋅m (148 lb⋅ft) @ 3500 rpm
2.0 EcoFuel	2006–2009	I4 8V	BSX	1,984 cc	80 kW (109 PS; 107 hp) @ 5,400 rpm	160 N⋅m (118 lb⋅ft) @ 3,500 rpm
1.6 TDI	2010–2015	I4 16V	CAYB	1,598 cc	66 kW (90 PS; 89 hp) @ 4,200 rpm	230 N⋅m (170 lb⋅ft) @ 1,500–2,500 rpm,
1.6 TDI	2010–2015	I4 16V	CAYC	1,598 cc	77 kW (105 PS; 103 hp) @ 4,400 rpm	250 N⋅m (184 lb⋅ft) @ 1,500–2,500 rpm,
1.9 TDI	2004–2010	I4 8V	BRU/BXF/BXJ	1,896 cc	66 kW (90 PS; 89 hp) @ 4,000 rpm	210 N⋅m (155 lb⋅ft) @ 1,800–2,500 rpm
1.9 TDI	2003–2004	I4 8V	AVQ	1,896 cc	74 kW (101 PS; 99 hp) @ 4,000 rpm	250 N⋅m (184 lb⋅ft) @ 1,900 rpm
1.9 TDI	2004–2010	I4 8V	BJB/BKC/BXE/BLS	1,896 cc	77 kW (105 PS; 103 hp) @ 4,000 rpm	250 N⋅m (184 lb⋅ft) @ 1,900 rpm
2.0 TDI	2003–2004	I4 16V	AZV	1,968 cc	100 kW (136 PS; 134 hp) @ 4,000 rpm	320 N⋅m (236 lb⋅ft) @ 1,750–2,500 rpm
2.0 TDI	2004–2010	I4 16V	BKD	1,968 cc	103 kW (140 PS; 138 hp) @ 4,000 rpm	320 N⋅m (236 lb⋅ft) @ 1,750–2,500 rpm
2.0 TDI DPF	2005–2010	I4 8V	BMM	1,968 cc	103 kW (140 PS; 138 hp) @ 4,000 rpm	320 N⋅m (236 lb⋅ft) @ 1,750–2,500 rpm
2.0 TDI DPF	2010–2015	I4 16V	CBAB	1,968 cc	103 kW (140 PS; 138 hp) @ 4,200 rpm	320 N⋅m (236 lb⋅ft) @ 1,750–2,500 rpm
2.0 TDI DPF	2005–2010	I4 16V	BMN	1,968 cc	125 kW (170 PS; 168 hp) @ 4,200 rpm	350 N⋅m (258 lb⋅ft) @ 1,750–2,500 rpm
2.0 TDI DPF	2012–2015	I4 16V	CFJB	1,968 cc	130 kW (177 PS; 174 hp) @ 4,200 rpm	380 N⋅m (280 lb⋅ft) @ 1,750–2,500 rpm

The diesel models of the Touran offer better fuel economy. Given the proper conditions, it is possible to achieve over 60 mpg_{‑imp} (4.7 L/100 km; 50 mpg_{‑US}) in a diesel Touran.

The car is delivered with a five- (1.6 only) and six speed manual transmissions, Tiptronic six speed automatic transmission (in 1.6, 1.6 FSI and 2.0 FSI (2003 to 2006 only)) or the DSG twin clutch automatic transmission; the 1.4 TSI, the 1.6 FSI from 2003 to 2006, the 1.9 TDI from 2003 to 2008, and the 2.0 TDI uses the six speed version, and the 1.9 TDI since the middle of 2008 use the seven-speed dry clutch version.

As for the 2010 model, an updated version of the 2.0 TDI engine was launched with common rail technology. The engine was introduced in the Volkswagen Passat in the models from 2008.

=== Touran Hy Motion and Hybrid ===
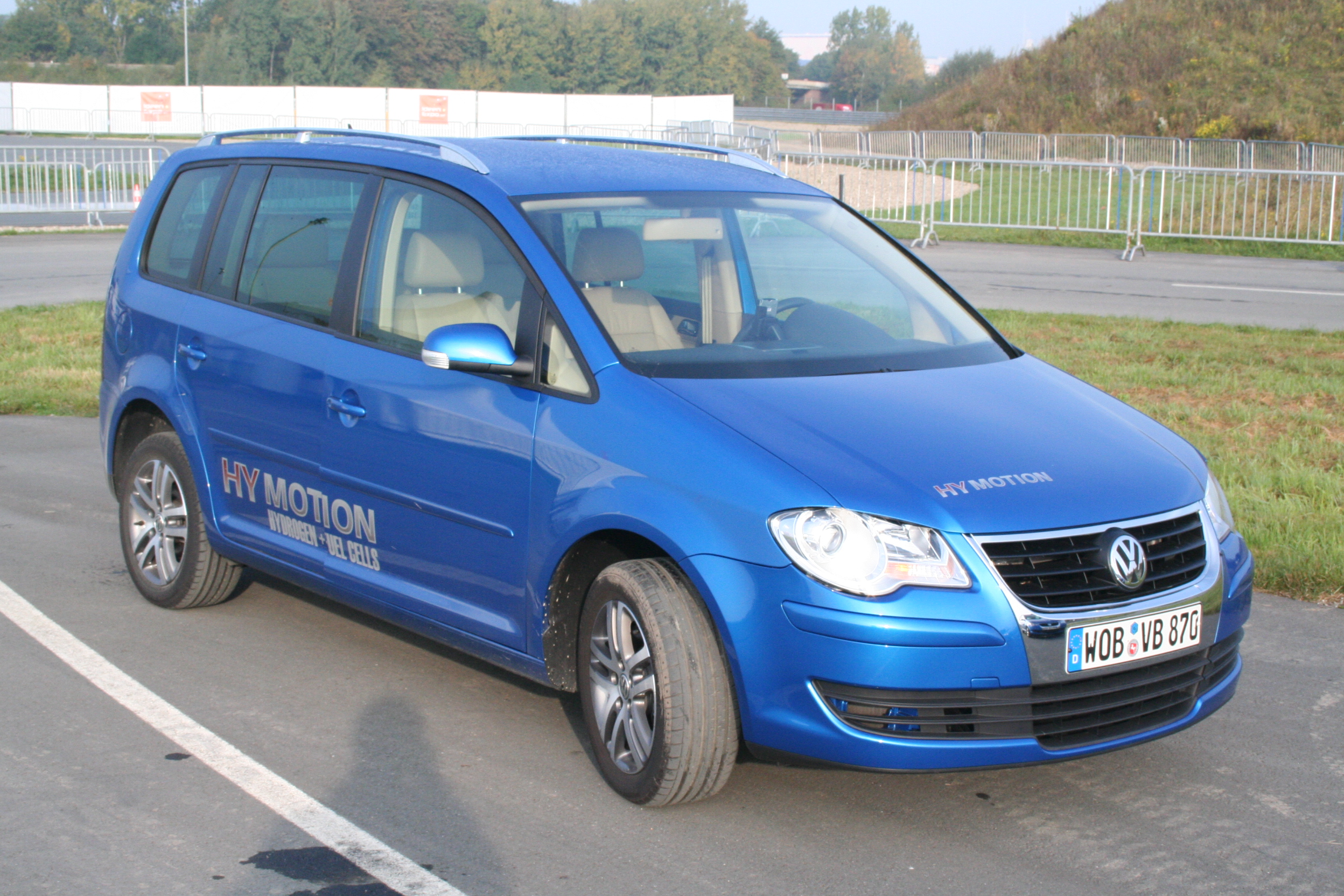
Touran HY MOTION Hydrogen Study

The Touran Hy Motion is Volkswagen's Hydrogen Development concept. It has a nickel-metal hydride battery which produces 80 kW (107 hp), it does the 0–100 km/h (0-62 mph) sprint in 14 seconds and has a top speed of 140 km/h (87.0 mph).

In 2008, Shanghai-Volkswagen with Tongji University had released a Touran Hybrid, as part of the lead up to the 2008 Beijing Olympic Games.

A prototype of the Touran Hybrid was shown with a 20 kW (27 hp) electric motor in conjunction with a 110 kW (148 hp) petrol engine, the transmission will most likely be Volkswagen's Direct-Shift Gearbox (DSG).

=== Minor yearly changes ===
Distinguishing different model years of the model can be difficult, but there are some minor changes which can help:

- up to 10/2004, the fog lights use a projector lens, after that, it was changed to a reflector type
- for the 2008 model year, the colour of the tinted glass was changed from green to gray (change was not applied to SAIC-VW built vehicles)
- for the 2009 model year, the fog lights were changed again, this time from a round shape, to a slightly elipsoid one, the grilles surrounding them are new also.
- for the 2010 model year, the 1T2 generation, received new side rear-view mirrors, from the Golf 6
- from 10/12/2012, the 1T3 received a sound insulated front windscreen, with the rain and light sensor being moved down 10mm

=== Awards and safety ===
- The Touran won What Car?'s 2005 Compact Van of the Year award.
- The Touran scored a maximum five star Euro NCAP crash safety rating.

== Second generation (Typ 5T; 2015) ==
Second generation
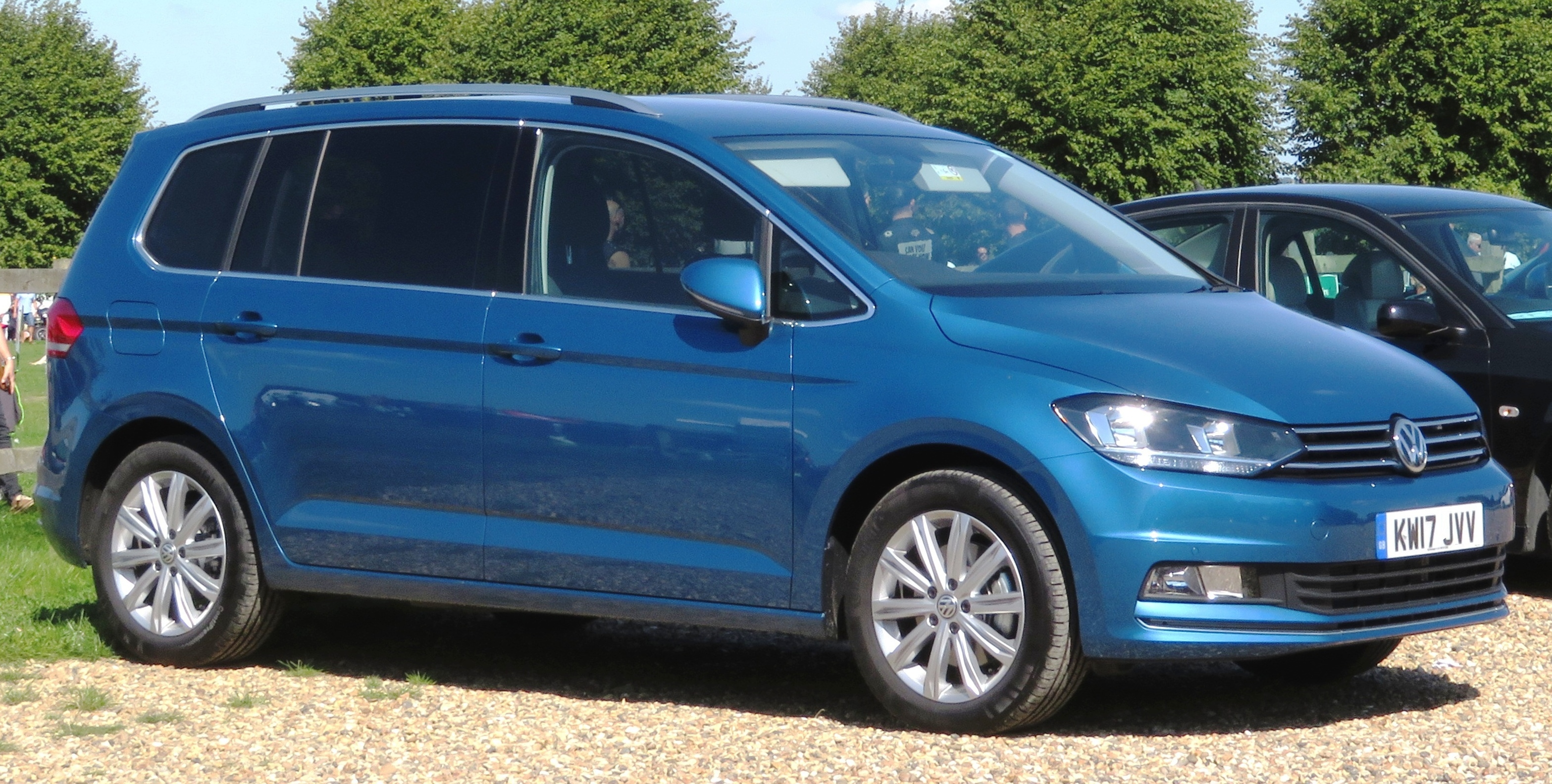

Overview
- Model code: 5T
- Production: 2015 – April 2026; 2016–present (China)
- Assembly: Germany: Wolfsburg; China: Changsha (SAIC-VW)
- Designer: Walter de Silva

Body and chassis
- Platform: Volkswagen Group MQB
- Related: Volkswagen Golf Mk7; Volkswagen Golf Sportsvan

Powertrain
- Engine: Petrol engines: 1.0 L OPF I3 TSI; 1.2 L CYVB I4 TSI; 1.4 L CZDA I4 TSI; 1.5 L OPF I4 TSI; 1.5 L EA211 I4 (China, Taxi Version); 1.6 L EA211 I4 (China, Taxi Version); 1.8 L EA888 I4 TSI; Diesel engines: 1.6 L SCR BMT I4 TDI; 2.0 L SCR I4 TDI; 2.0 L SCR BMT I4 TDI
- Transmission: 5 & 6-speed manual 6 & 7-speed DSG

Dimensions
- Wheelbase: 2,791 mm (109.9 in)
- Length: 4,527 mm (178.2 in); 4,537 mm (178.6 in) (Chinese market; 2021–present)
- Width: 1,829 mm (72.0 in); 1,834 mm (72.2 in) (Chinese market; 2021–present)
- Height: 1,628 mm (64.1 in); 1,659 mm (65.3 in)/1,682 mm (66.2 in) (Chinese market; 2021–present)

The second generation Touran was introduced at the 2015 Geneva Motor Show. It uses the Volkswagen Group MQB platform and offers increased cabin space, four new engines with 19% less fuel consumption, and an array of new advanced driver-assistance systems and infotainment options. Autoradio with Apple CarPlay and Android Auto is included as an option.

Visually, the car resembles Golf Sportsvan with an elongated rear trunk.

The drag coefficient was reduced to 0,296.

Wolfsburg plant stopped the production of the Touran at the end of April 2026 after 11 years.

=== China market ===
The Touran currently serves as the successor to the Volkswagen Santana in Shanghai's taxi fleet since October 2018, as the Santana was phased out. Qiangsheng, one of the largest taxi firms in Shanghai, stated that the Touran offered greater passenger comfort over its predecessor. 100 new electric cabs were also added to the taxi fleet. The Chinese market Touran L has the same wheelbase as the European model. It is available in 280TSI and 330TSI trims with the 1.4 litre TSI, known as the CSS in China, available on 280TSI models and the 1.8 litre TSI for 330TSI models. A 5 speed manual gearbox option is available on 280TSI models along with the 7 speed direct shift gearbox. 330TSI models come standard with the latter gearbox. The Touran L came standard in 5 seater configurations only when new. Pricing in 2016 ranged between 155,800 yuan and 230,800 yuan with 7 trim levels (23,850 to 35,330 USD - January 2021 exchange rate). Trim levels were known as: 280TSI Fashion (manual and DSG), 280TSI Comfort (manual and DSG), 280TSI Elegant (DSG only), 280TSI Deluxe and 330TSI Deluxe. A 1.6 litre engine was only available for the 2018 model year under the Fashion trim level. Six-seater and seven-seater configurations were added to the range for the 2018 model year onwards.

As of January 2021, for the 2021 model year, only one model, the 280TSI was available. Trim levels are known as: Fashion (7-seater), Comfort (7-seater), Extension (6 and 7 seater) and Deluxe (6 and 7 seater). Pricing ranges between 151,800 yuan and 194,800 yuan (23,235 to 29,820 USD - January 2021 exchange rate).

Additionally, in 2018 Cross Touran L was announced, being still the same wheelbase, but with plastic wheel arches and chassis sitting 23mm higher.

=== Awards ===
- In January 2021, the Touran 1.5 TSI 150 SE was named MPV of the Year by What Car? magazine. What Car? awarded the Touran five stars out of five in its review of the car.

=== Engine specifications ===
Petrol engines
Model	Year(s)	Displacement	Fuel type	Power	Torque	0–100 km/h (0–62 mph)	CO2 Emissions
1.0 TSI OPF	Jan 2019 – Jul 2019	999 cc (61.0 cu in)	Petrol	115 PS (85 kW; 113 bhp)	190 N⋅m (140 ft⋅lb_{f})	11.3 s	125 g/km
1.2 TSI CYVB	May 2015 – Aug 2018	1,197 cc (73.0 cu in)	Petrol	110 PS (81 kW; 108 bhp)	175 N⋅m (129 ft⋅lb_{f})	11.3 s	128 g/km
1.4 TSI CZDA/CSS (China)	May 2015–	1,395 cc (85.1 cu in)	Petrol	150 PS (110 kW; 148 bhp)	250 N⋅m (184 ft⋅lb_{f})	8.9 s	126 g/km
1.5 TSI OPF	Nov 2018–	1,498 cc (91.4 cu in)	Petrol	150 PS (110 kW; 148 bhp)	250 N⋅m (184 ft⋅lb_{f})	8.9 s	125-128 g/km
1.8 TSI	Feb 2016– May 2018	1,798 cc (109.7 cu in)	Petrol	180 PS (132 kW; 178 bhp)	250 N⋅m (184 ft⋅lb_{f})	8.3 s	140 g/km

Diesel engines
Model	Year(s)	Displacement	Fuel type	Power	Torque	0–100 km/h (0–62 mph)	CO2 Emissions
1.6 TDI (SCR) BMT	May 2015 – Apr 2016	1,598 cc (97.5 cu in)	Diesel	110 PS (81 kW; 108 bhp)	250 N⋅m (184 ft⋅lb_{f})	11.9 s	115-118 g/km
1.6 TDI (SCR) BMT	Apr 2016 – Aug 2019	1,598 cc (97.5 cu in)	Diesel	115 PS (85 kW; 113 bhp)	250 N⋅m (184 ft⋅lb_{f})	11.4 s	117-121 g/km
2.0 TDI (SCR)	Aug 2019 – Oct 2020	1,968 cc (120.1 cu in)	Diesel	116 PS (85 kW; 114 bhp)	300 N⋅m (221 ft⋅lb_{f})	11.3 s	119–121 g/km
2.0 TDI (SCR)	Oct 2020 –	1,968 cc (120.1 cu in)	Diesel	122 PS (90 kW; 120 bhp)	320 N⋅m (236 ft⋅lb_{f})	10.8 s	116–121 g/km
2.0 TDI (SCR) BMT	May 2015 – Nov 2020	1,968 cc (120.1 cu in)	Diesel	150 PS (110 kW; 148 bhp)	340 N⋅m (251 ft⋅lb_{f})	9.3 s	118–121 g/km
2.0 TDI (SCR)	Nov 2020 –	1,968 cc (120.1 cu in)	Diesel	150 PS (110 kW; 148 bhp)	340 N⋅m (251 ft⋅lb_{f})	9.3 s	122–123 g/km
2.0 TDI (SCR) BMT	Feb 2016 – Aug 2018	1,968 cc (120.1 cu in)	Diesel	190 PS (140 kW; 187 bhp)	400 N⋅m (295 ft⋅lb_{f})	8.2 s	122-125 g/km
2.0 TDI (SCR) BMT	Jan 2019 – Jul 2019	1,968 cc (120.1 cu in)	Diesel	190 PS (140 kW; 187 bhp)	400 N⋅m (295 ft⋅lb_{f})	8.2 s	(125) g/km

=== Gallery ===
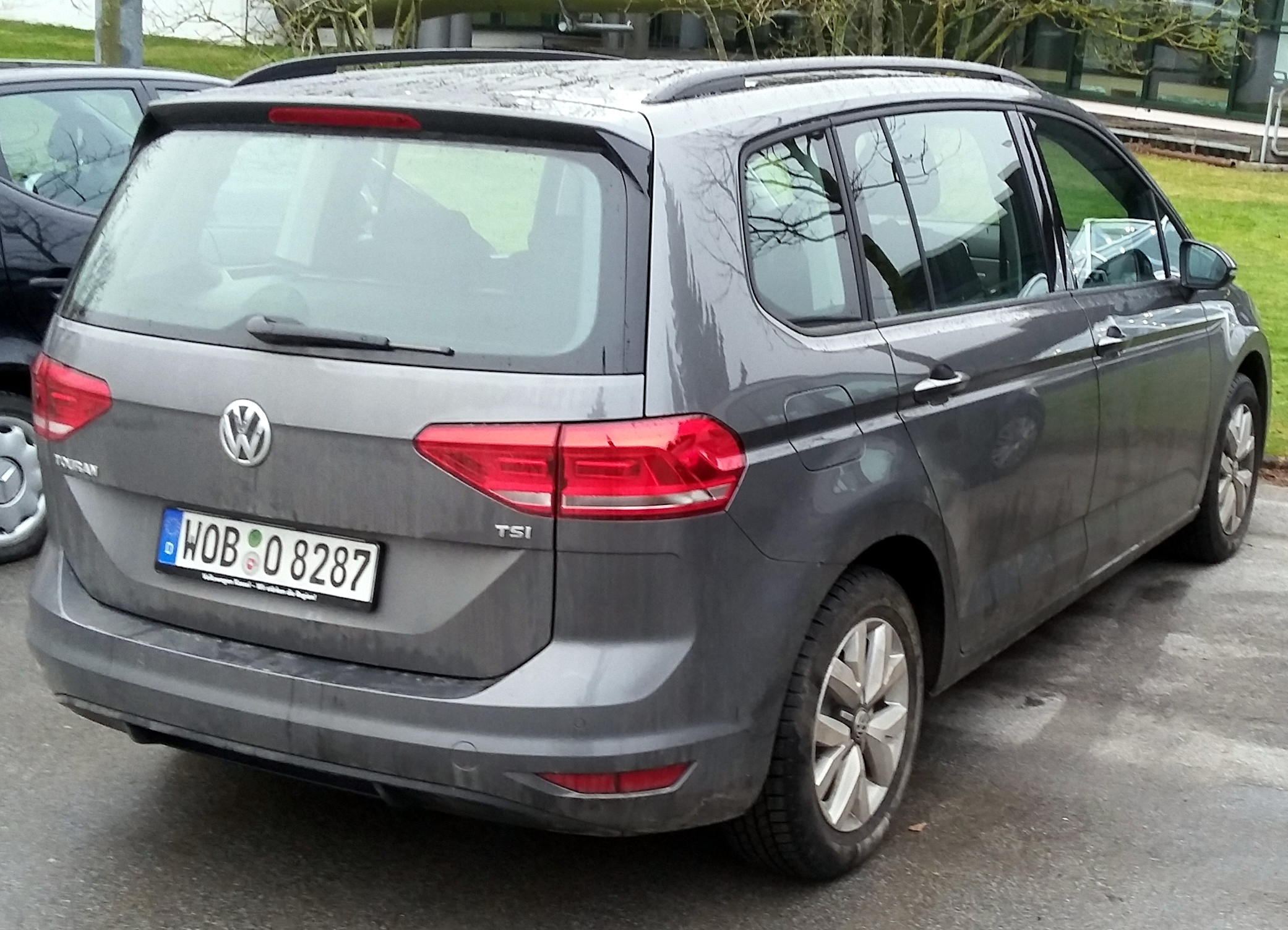
Volkswagen Touran

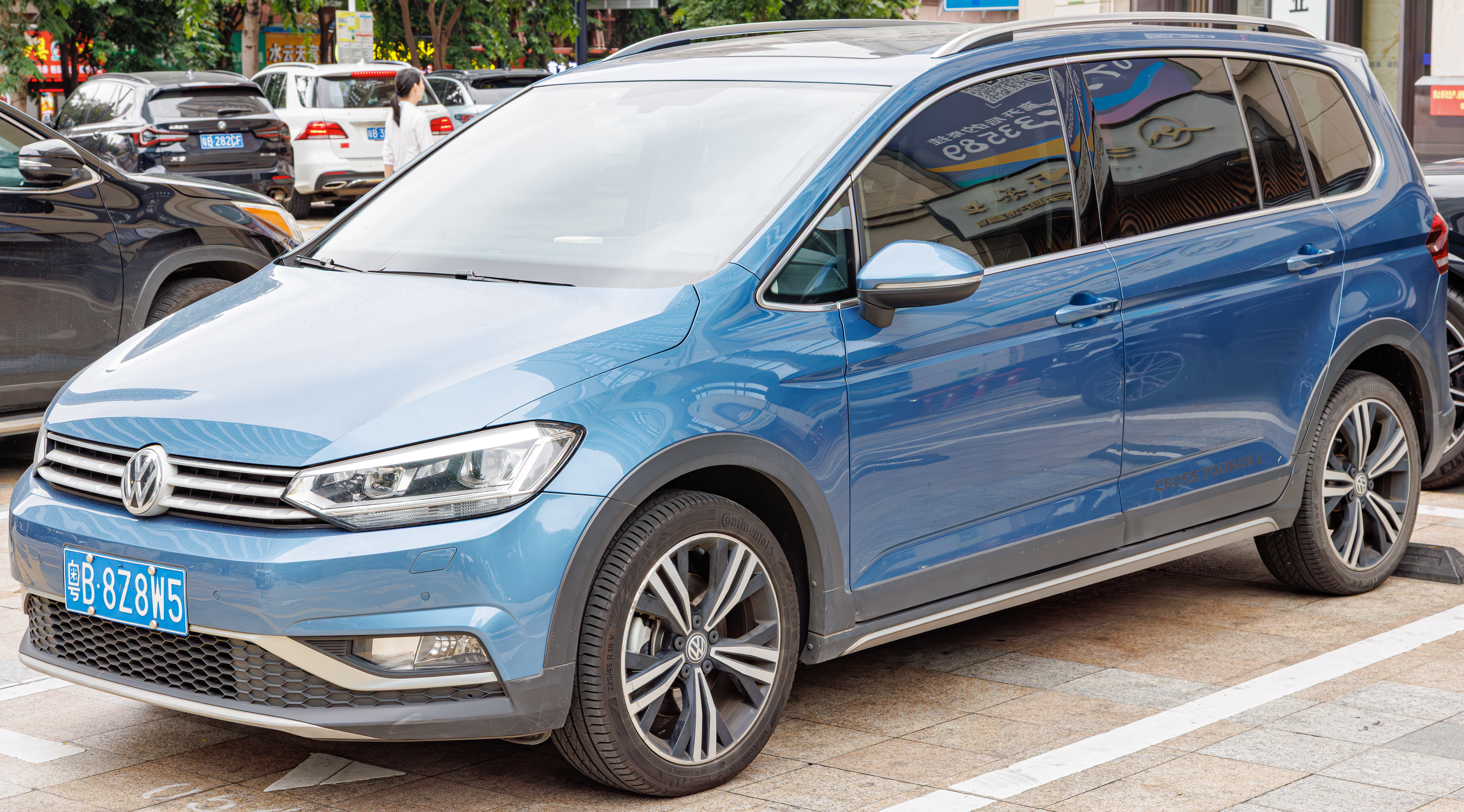
Cross Touran L (China)

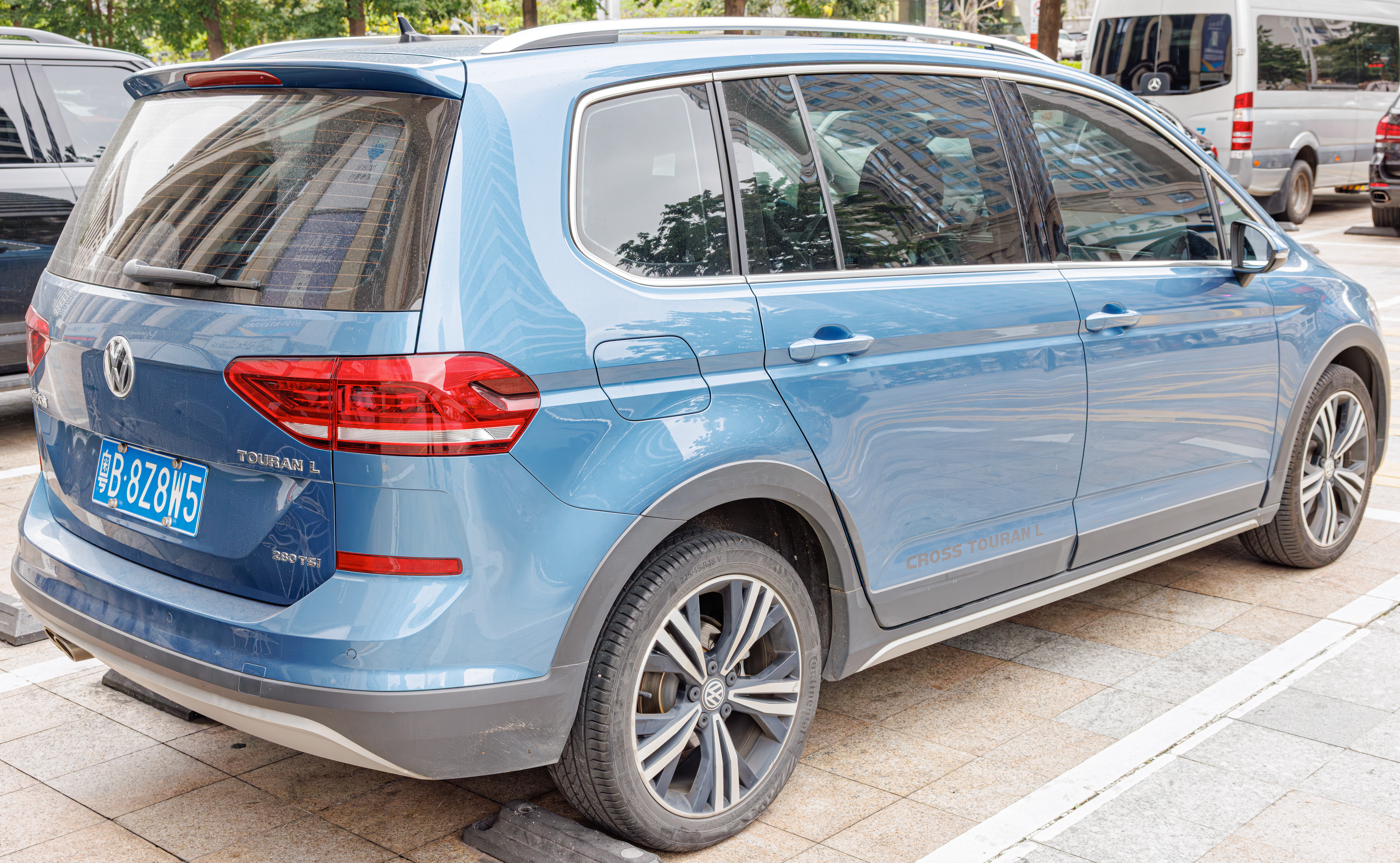
Cross Touran L (China)

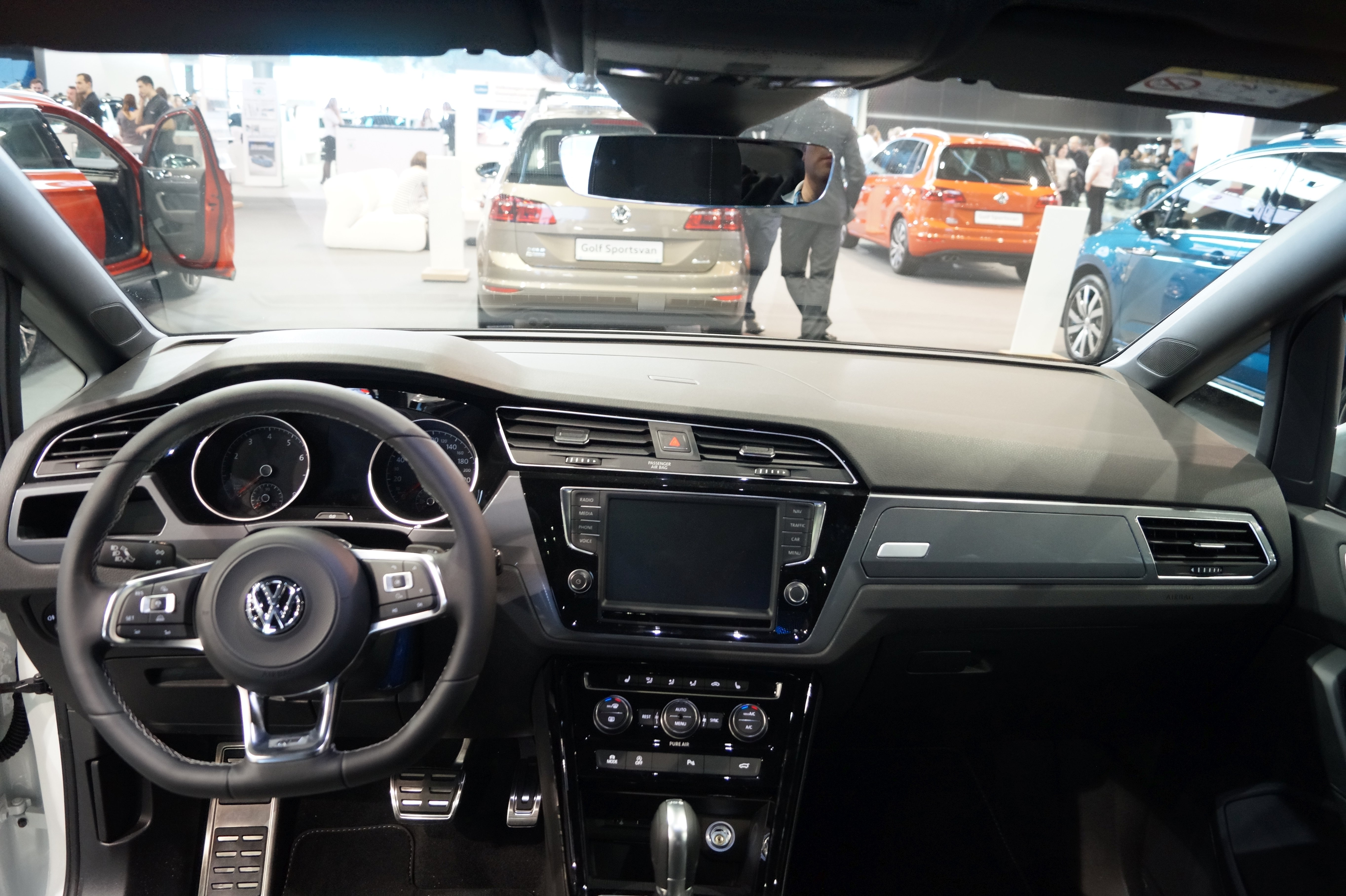
Interior

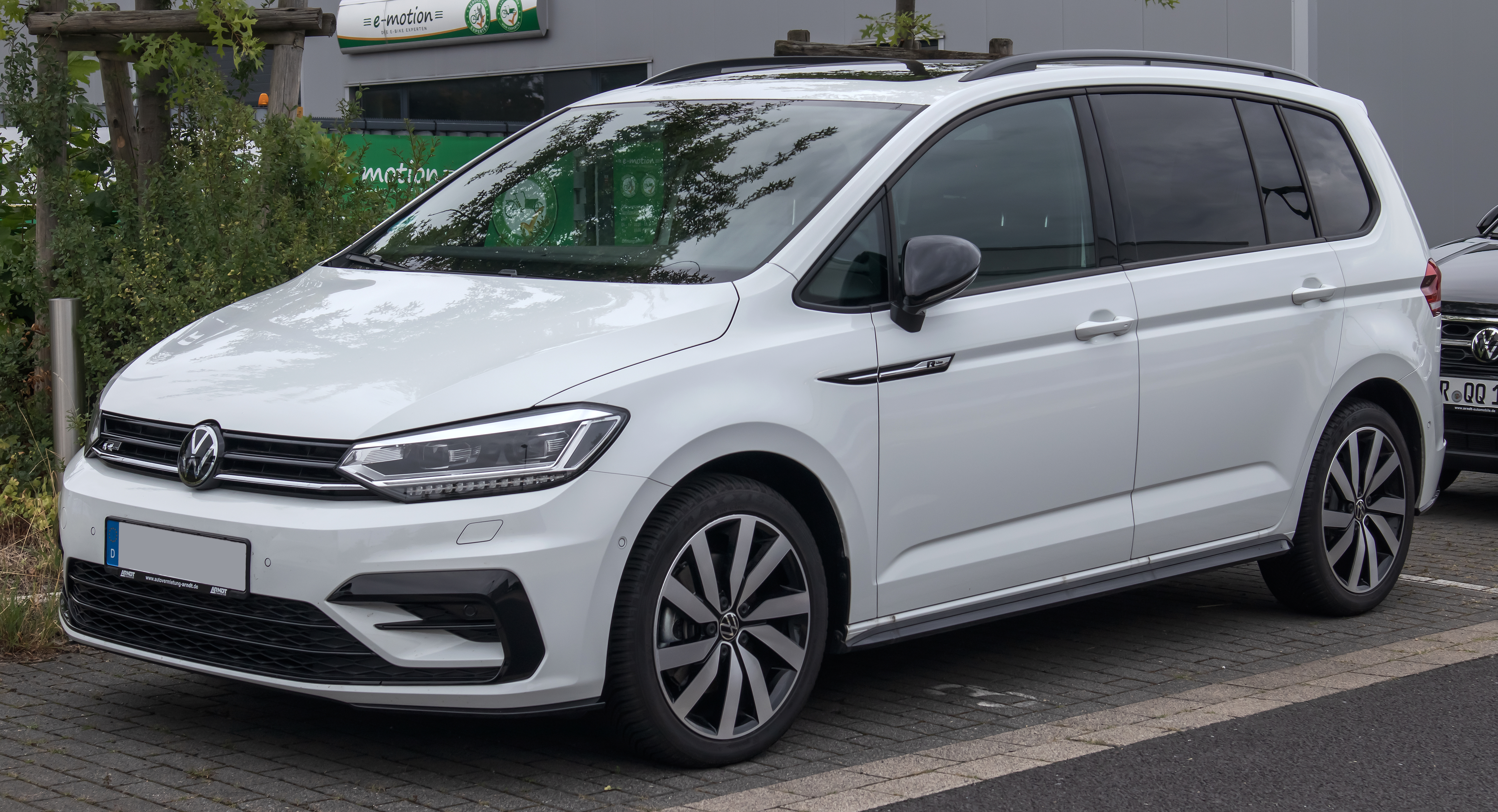
Facelift

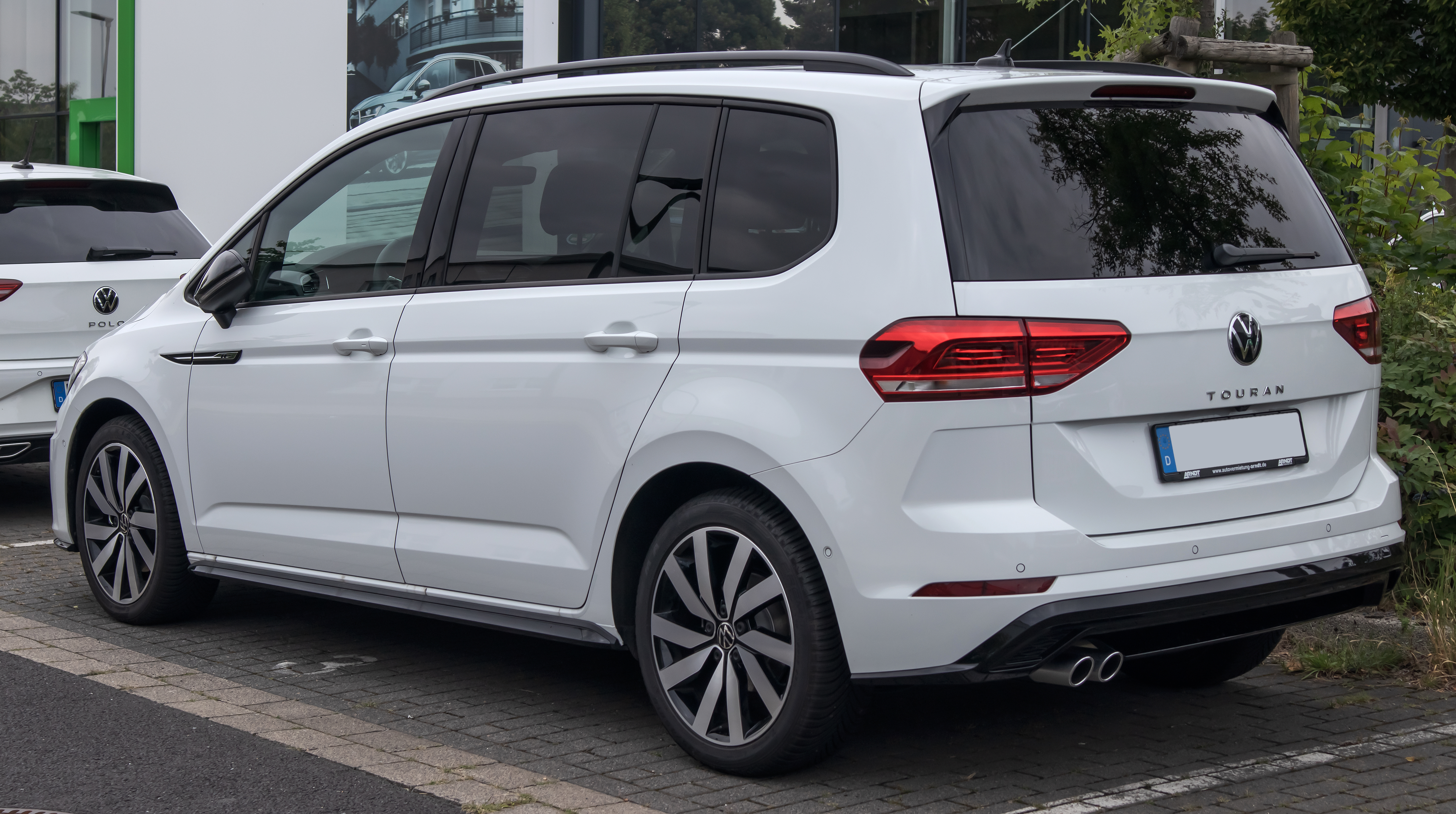
Facelift

=== Safety ===
Euro NCAP test results Volkswagen Touran 1.5 TSI Comfortline (LHD) (2022)
Test	Points	%
Overall:	4 /5 stars	
Adult occupant:	29.4	77%
Child occupant:	40.0	81%
Pedestrian:	34.0	62%
Safety assist:	10.7	66%

== In media ==
A modified Volkswagen Touran appears in the 2006 film The Fast and the Furious: Tokyo Drift and was owned by Twinkie (Little Bow Wow).

== Sales ==
Year	Production
2003	136,510
2004	188,643
2005	191,207
2006	178,122
2007	197,941
2008	148,196
2009	126,168
2010	134,897
2011	160,936
2012	152,683
2013	135,382
2014	126,567
2015	120,507
2016	164,248
2017	144,676
2018	130,417
2019	90,366
2020	56,833
2021	30,603
2022	27,403
2023	33,983
