= SEAT Bolero =

SEAT Bolero 330 BT
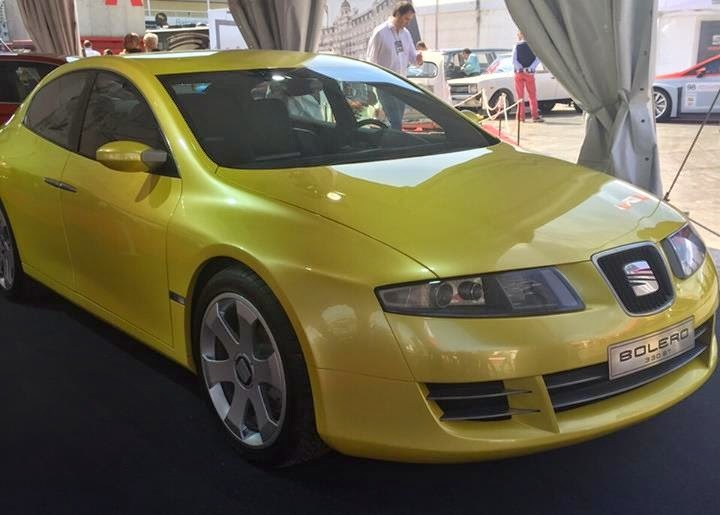

Overview
- Manufacturer: SEAT, SA; Stola
- Production: 1998 (concept car)
- Designer: Erwin Leo Himmel

Body and chassis
- Class: Compact executive car (D)
- Body style: 4-door saloon
- Layout: Longitudinal front-engine, front-wheel-drive
- Doors: Sliding doors

Powertrain
- Engine: 2.8 L V6 biturbo
- Transmission: 6-speed sportronic (tiptronic) automatic

Dimensions
- Length: 4,520 mm (178.0 in)
- Width: 1,870 mm (73.6 in)
- Height: 1,380 mm (54.3 in)

Chronology
- Successor: SEAT Exeo

The SEAT Bolero 330 BT was a concept car presented at the 1998 Geneva Salon International de l’Auto. It was available as a four-door, four seat saloon car body style. The "330 BT" is derived from the power output of 330 PS. No five-door, four-seat estate car body style is ever produced.

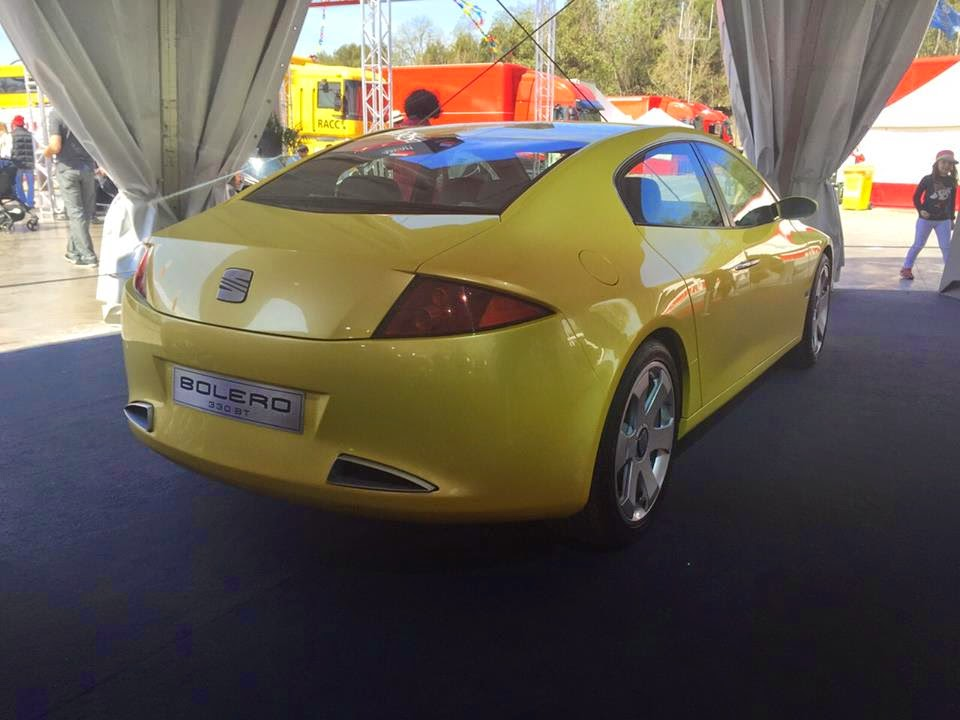
SEAT Bolero 330 GT

One of the most remarkable aspects of this concept consists in the elimination of the B-pillar and the use of hinges, due to which the doors could open independently in a contrary suicide door like manner, leaving room for an easier access to the rear seats. The SEAT Bolero's doors open in a manner of front conventional doors and rear sliding doors.

The design of the car was a four-door saloon with rear sliding doors (four door, front engine).

Another interesting issue is that the design of the SEAT Bolero incorporated many stylistic elements that would later be implemented in other models of the brand, especially in the front fascia. During development, the SEAT Exeo was codenamed Bolero, before being renamed Exeo.

== Specification ==
The Bolero is powered by a 2.8-litre V6 engine with two turbochargers (aka 'biturbo'), which is mounted longitudinally at the front. It produces a maximum power output of 330 PS (243 kW; 325 bhp) at 5,800 revolutions per minute (rpm), and generates a peak torque output of 500 newton-metres (369 lbf⋅ft) between 1,800 and 3,600 rpm.

The driveline includes a transaxle six speed 'sportronic' tiptronic automatic transmission, with the output being routed through a conventional front-wheel drive system.

It rides on 9Jx19" alloy wheels shod with 255/40 R19 tyres. Performance figures indicate that the Bolero completes the standard discipline of sprinting from a standing start to 100 kilometres per hour (62.1 mph) in 5.0 seconds, and will reach an estimated top speed of 275 km/h (170.9 mph).
