= Erwin Leo Himmel =

Austrian automobile designer (born 1956)

Erwin Leo Himmel (born April 9, 1956 in Graz, Austria) is an Austrian automobile designer.

== Background ==
Born as the second of two sons in 1956, Erwin Leo Himmel grew up in Leibnitz, Austria. After finishing high school, he started to study architecture at the Graz University of Technology. In the second year of his studies, he read an article about automobile design, where he recognized the existence of the profession of an automobile designer. While studying further he taught himself to sketch cars by copying drawings he found in magazines. After preparing a portfolio of his own designs, he applied for a job as an automobile designer in Germany. Getting accepted by Audi, Ford, and Volkswagen, Himmel decided to quit his studies and took the job at Audi. The former chief designer of Audi Hartmut Warkuss offered him a scholarship for the Royal College of Art in London. Himmel attended the full two-year master program and graduated in 1981.

== Automotive design ==
=== Audi, 1982–1994 ===
After graduating he came back to the design centre of Audi in Ingolstadt, Germany, and started his career. Himmel worked on Audi models from the mid-1980s to the mid-1990s such as the Audi 80 Sedan, Avant, Coupe and Cabriolet, Audi 100 Sedan and Avant, and the Audi V8. He enjoyed working together with other designers such as J Mays and Peter Schreyer. In 1990, he became Director of Audi’s Munich-based design studio where he had the idea to develop a new concept, the Audi Quattro Spyder, which appeared at the “Frankfurt IAA” in 1991.

=== Design Centre Europe, 1995–1999 ===
In 1994, Erwin Leo Himmel helped establish the first external Volkswagen Group design centre in Europe. The choice of location eventually fell on Barcelona, Spain. A suitable piece of land was found in Sitges, a seaside town next to Barcelona. Himmel was responsible for the planning and realization of the newly built 130-people design facility, which was named “DCE – Design Centre Europe”. He worked there for Audi, Volkswagen, SEAT and Skoda. Such designs as the Audi A8, S3 and RS4, and Volkswagen Touareg, Touran and parts of the Golf IV and Phaeton were created.

=== Fuore Design, 2000–2007 ===
At the end of 1999, Himmel was offered the position of chief designer at Skoda, but decided instead to start his own business. He then founded the independent 35-people design studio “Fuore Design” in the heart of Barcelona. Beside the core business of automotive design, he specialized in brand consulting.

He consulted Mitsubishi in their process of finding a new design language, and created two concept cars, the Mitsubishi Pajero Evolution and Pajero Evolution 2+2, which were presented at the 2001 “Frankfurt IAA” and the 2002 “Geneva Salon International de l’Auto”. After the feedback at the shows, Himmel was also responsible for the design development of the Dakar Rally multiple-champion racing car Mitsubishi Pajero Evolution.

Subaru had a strategic relationship with Fuore. Himmel developed a new brand design strategy. His concept car, the Subaru B11S, showed the new philosophy at the 2003 “Geneva Salon International de l’Auto”. The Subaru R1, R2 and B9 Tribeca were also created by him, too. With the ‘XF 10’ and the ‘BlackJag’, Himmel presented his first self-developed show cars at the 2003 “Barcelona Salón Internacional del Automóvil” and the 2004 “Geneva Salon International de l’Auto”. After a hard year in 2006 and a bad forecast of incoming contracts in 2007, Himmel did not see a good enough economic perspective to continue and decided to sell the company at the middle of 2007.

=== Hispano Suiza Automobilmanufaktur AG, from 2008 ===
After selling Fuore Design in 2007, Erwin Leo Himmel dedicated himself to his dream goal of owning his own car brand in the luxury segment. After years of research and his activities in Barcelona, he noticed the historic automobile brand Hispano Suiza. Since the brand became free after decades of inactivity, Erwin Leo Himmel registered this brand in a few countries where the Hispano Suiza founding family Suqué Mateu did not renew the name registration and tried to bring it back to life. He then faced legal challenges from Hispano Suiza Cars, producers of the Carmen, who were associated with the Peralada Group owned by the Suqué Mateu family, descendants of one of Hispano-Suiza's original founders.

In 2019 Erwin Leo Himmel expanded Hispano Suiza with its own division for alternative drive technologies in the hydrogen sector. This department was reportedly developing another model with a hydrogen drive in addition to the conventional model with a combustion engine.

== Bankruptcy ==
In February 2022 the Hispano Suiza Engineering GmbH, of which Mr. Himmel was the Managing Director, declared bankruptcy with total debts of €4,7 Mio. against estimated assets of €42.800.

== Industrial design ==
In his time at Fuore, Himmel worked in industrial design as well. Panasonic signed a strategic relationship with Fuore. From this, Himmel created such things as a cell-phone, an MP3-player, a home cinema system, a telephone, an air conditioner and other white goods for Panasonic. He also worked for companies such as LG and Samsung. Another field he worked in was transportation design, including the exterior and interior design of trains. For example, Himmel developed the design of a new high-speed train for Talgo. He also designed interiors for airplanes. His ‘biggest’ project was a cruise liner for an American ocean carrier. Furthermore, he did work in the motorcycle industry, including the development of a new design language for Honda's motorcycle division. He also did work for the luxury industry, including TAG Heuer. Moreover, he designed a bath ceramic series for Roca.

== Production car designs ==
Launch	Vehicle	Production period
1986	Audi 80 Sedan (B3)	1986-1991
1987	Audi 90 Sedan (B3)	1987-1991
1988	Audi V8 quattro (D11)	1988-1994
1988	Audi Coupé (B3)	1988-1996
1990	Audi 100 Sedan (C4)	1990-1997
1991	Audi 80 Sedan (B4)	1991-1994
1991	Audi Cabriolet (Type 89)	1991-2000
1991	Audi 100 Avant (C4)	1991-1998
1992	Audi 80 Avant (B4)	1992-1995
1997	Volkswagen Golf IV (1J)	1997-2003
1999	Audi S3 (8L)	1999-2003
1999	SEAT Ibiza (6K GP01)	1999-2002
2000	Audi RS4 (B5)	2000-2002
2002	Audi A8 (D3)	2002-2010
2002	Volkswagen Touareg	2002-2010
2002	Volkswagen Phaeton	2002-2011
2003	Volkswagen Touran	2003-2015
2003	Subaru R2	2003-2010
2005	Subaru B9 Tribeca	2005-2007
2005	Subaru R1	2005-2010
2021	Maguari HS1 GTC	2021

== Concept cars ==
Year	Concept car	Show
1991	Audi Quattro Spyder	Frankfurt IAA
1998	SEAT Bolero	Geneva Salon International de l’Auto
1999	SEAT Formula	Geneva Salon International de l’Auto
2001	Mitsubishi Pajero Evolution	Frankfurt IAA
2002	Mitsubishi Pajero Evolution 2+2	Geneva Salon International de l’Auto
2003	Subaru B11S	Geneva Salon International de l’Auto
2003	Fuore XF10	Barcelona Salón Internacional del Automóvil
2004	Fuore BlackJag	Geneva Salon International de l’Auto
2010	Hispano Suiza Grand Turismo	Geneva Salon International de l’Auto

== Notes ==
- Car Styling (Japan), Summer 1983, no. 43, pp. 52–57
- Profile (Netherlands), November 1983, no. 4, pp. 26–31
- Auto Bild (Germany), September 16, 1991, no. 38, pp. 8/9
- Auto Motor und Sport (Germany), September 20, 1991, no. 20, pp. 26–28
- Kurier (Austria), July 4, 1997, p. 5
- Car Styling (Japan), July 7, 2001, no. 143, pp. 68–75
- La Vanguardia (Spain), May 28, 2002, no. 43306, p. 83
- Auto Revue (Austria), September 2002, no. 9, pp. 78–80
- Süddeutsche Zeitung (Germany), June 7, 2003, no. 130, p. V1
- Automobil Revue (Switzerland), June 26, 2003, no. 26, p. 19
- Autotrends (China), December 2003, no. 96, pp. 102–105
- Auto Focus (Germany), May/June 2004, no. 3, pp. 70 – 75
