= Subaru B11S =

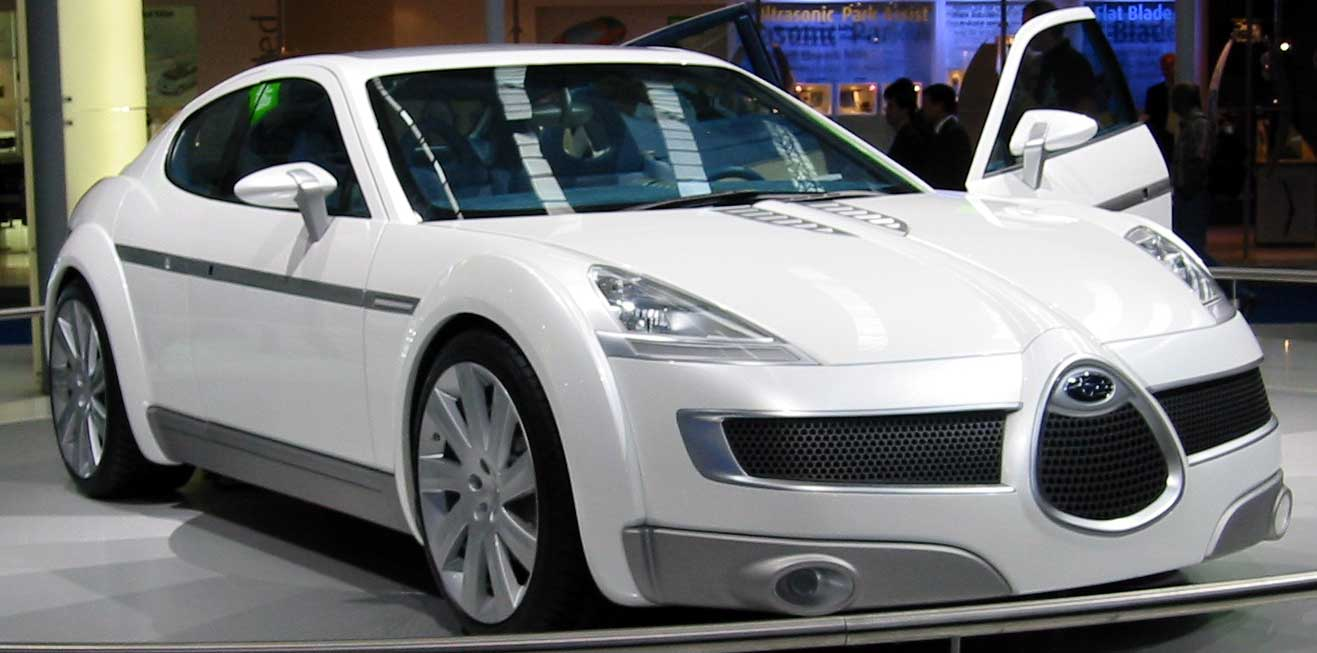
- The Subaru B11S displayed at the 2003 IAA (Frankfurt)

Overview
- Manufacturer: Subaru
- Production: 2003 (Concept)
- Designer: Kiyoshi Sugimoto; Erwin Leo Himmel (Fuore Design)

Body and chassis
- Class: Sports car
- Body style: 4-door fastback/quad coupé
- Layout: F4

Powertrain
- Engine: 3.0 L EZ flat-6 twin turbo
- Transmission: 6 speed automatic

Dimensions
- Wheelbase: 2,800 mm (110.2 in)
- Length: 4,785 mm (188.4 in)
- Width: 1,935 mm (76.2 in)
- Height: 1,370 mm (53.9 in)
- Curb weight: 1,580 kg (3,483 lb)

The Subaru B11S was a concept sports coupe made by Subaru, introduced at the 2003 Geneva Motor Show.

== Design ==
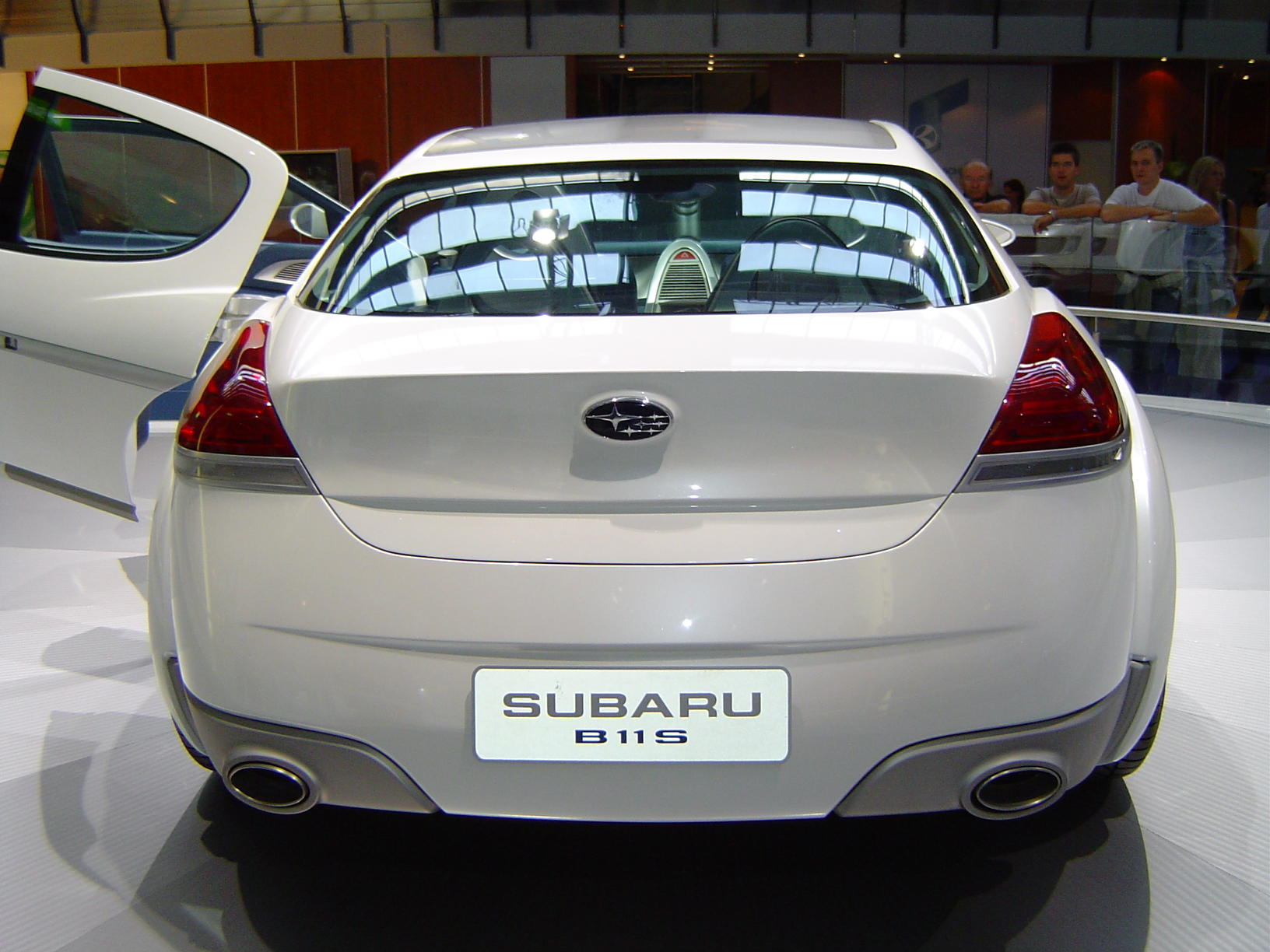
Subaru B11S at IAA in 2003

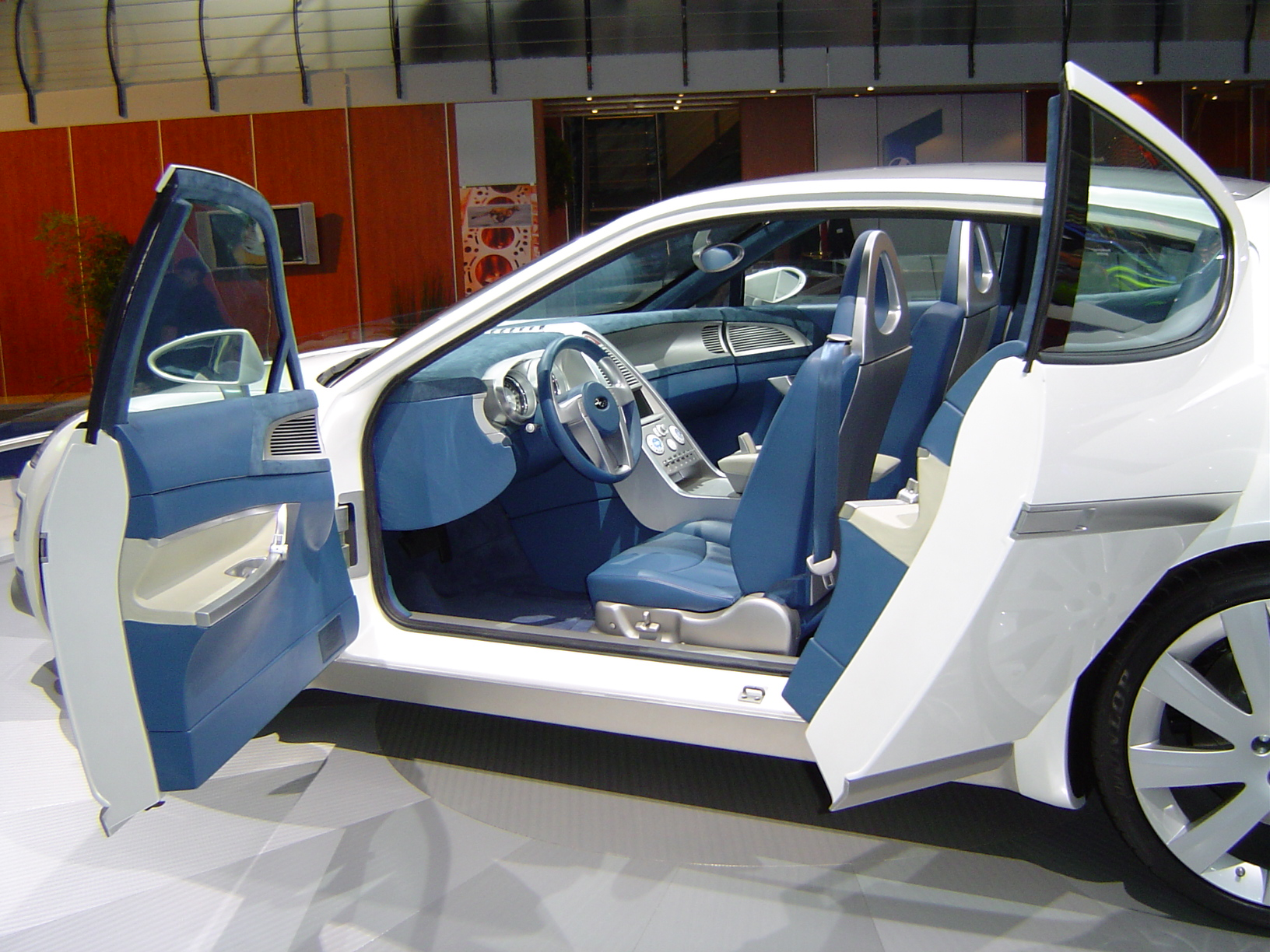
B11S interior view with the doors open

The model number "B11S" derives from B (for Boxer, referring to Subaru's horizontally opposed engines), 11 (indicating a premium class), and S (for Sportive). The B11S featured four doors in a quad coupe arrangement, with the rear doors hinged at the rear in a manner similar to the Mazda RX-8 and Saturn Ion.

The B11S was styled by a team led by Kiyoshi Sugimoto, with initial guidance provided by freshly promoted president Kyoji Takenaka. Sugimoto had previously designed the first-generation Subaru Legacy before heading the Subaru Design Department. Fuore Design International, led by Erwin Leo Himmel, was retained in a consulting design role.

Design elements created for the B11S, including the airplane-inspired grille, were intended to be carried into production vehicles. Andreas Zapatinas, Chief Designer of Advanced Design for Subaru, stated in an interview that "if you were to step back from the B11S and blur your eyes, that gives an indication of Subaru's future look," elaborating that "innovation, courage and individuality" would inform future Subaru designs.

== Technical ==
The B11S features a 3.0 L (183 in^{3}) flat-6 twin-turbo engine with a peak output of 294 kW (394 hp) at 6,400 RPM and 550 N⋅m (406 lbf⋅ft) from 3,600 to 4,800 RPM. The 6-speed automatic transmission features Subaru's "Variable Torque Distribution" system, where the torque split between front and rear axles is distributed by a center differential and electronically controlled clutch. Torque is split 35% to the front and 65% to the rear under normal driving conditions.
