= SEAT Fórmula =

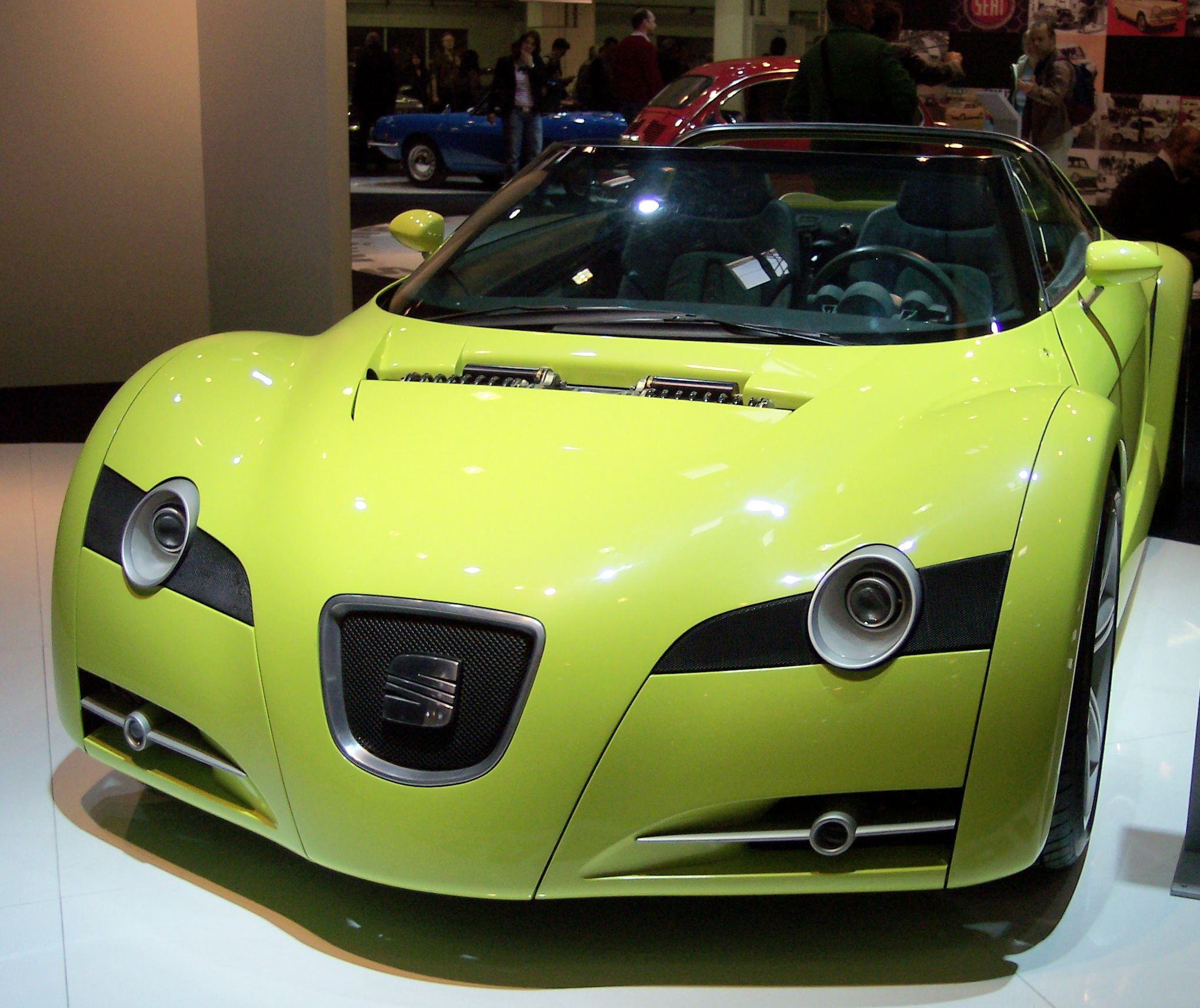

Overview
- Manufacturer: SEAT, SA; Stola
- Production: 1999 (Concept car)
- Assembly: Turin, Italy
- Designer: Erwin Leo Himmel

Body and chassis
- Class: Sports car (S)
- Body style: 2-door roadster
- Layout: Mid-engine, rear-wheel-drive
- Platform: aluminium spaceframe
- Doors: Butterfly

Powertrain
- Engine: 2.0 L (120 cu in) 20-valve Turbocharged I4
- Transmission: 6-speed sequential semi-automatic

Dimensions
- Wheelbase: 2,523 mm (99.3 in)
- Length: 3,943 mm (155.2 in)
- Width: 1,758 mm (69.2 in)
- Height: 1,152 mm (45.4 in)
- Curb weight: 900 kg (2,000 lb)

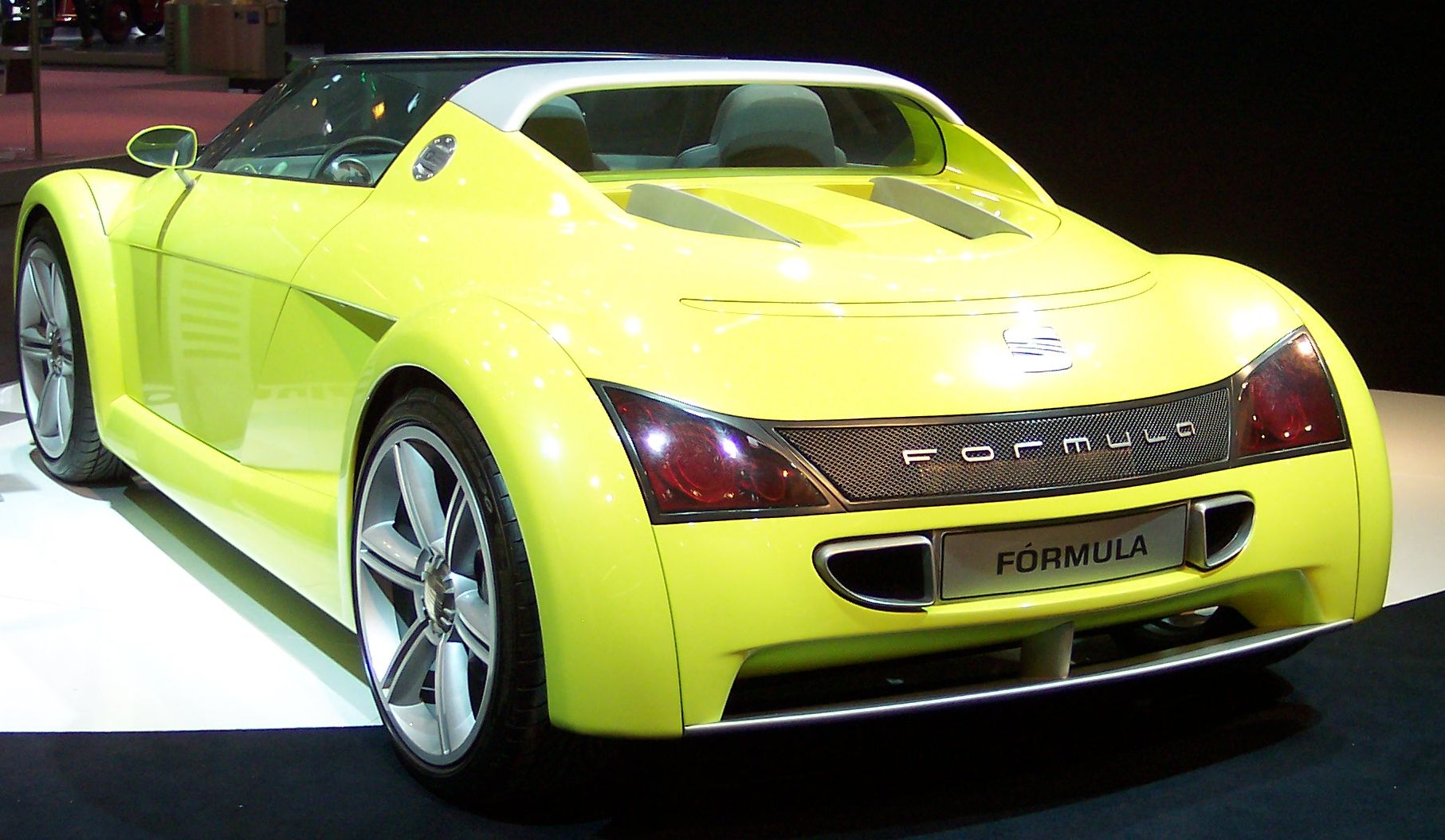
SEAT Fórmula concept, rear view

The SEAT Fórmula is a rear-wheel-drive mid-engined roadster concept car developed by the Spanish carmaker SEAT initially aimed at limited car production. Designed at the Volkswagen Group's Design Center Europe at Sitges near Barcelona a facility jointly owned by Volkswagen, Audi and SEAT, it was penned by a team directed by Erwin Leo Himmel into which participated the Lotus Elise designer Julian Thomson exposing the design language of the future models of the brand.

The name Fórmula itself derives from the brand's heritage from the past, as a reminding of the creation of the Spanish Fórmula Nacional race tracks back in the 1960s, when SEAT started its implication in motorsport activities.

The first concept for the car built by the Turinese company Stola was shown at the 1999 Geneva Salon international de l' auto, featuring a water-cooled 2-litre 20-valve turbo four-cylinder 240 hp engine which was riding onto an aluminium chassis weighing almost 900 kg. Its 20-inch light alloy wheels (7.5 J × 20" front and 9 J × 20" rear) were fitted on 205/45 R20 front and 255/35 R20 rear tires and mounted onto an independent suspension system consisting of Formula One-style wishbones in front and horizontally mounted dampers rear system. The combination of the very light chassis with the powerful engine (performing a maximum output of 240 bhp peaking at 5800 rpm and a maximum torque of 295 Nm between 2100 and 4800 rpm) and the six-speed sequential Sportronic electro-hydraulic semi-automatic gearbox, both deriving from SEAT's rally cars, gave the SEAT Fórmula the ability to reach 0–100 km/h in 4.8 seconds with a top speed of 235 km/h. As for the brakes, all front and rear wheels disposed ventilated disc brakes.

A 100-litre-volume luggage compartment was also available.
