= Sport Club Maguary =

Maguary
- Full name: Sport Club Maguary
- Nicknames: Clube dos Princípes; Equipe Cintanegrina; Cintanegrinos
- Founded: January 13, 2009
- Ground: Murilão, Fortaleza, Ceará state, Brazil
- Capacity: 3,000
Home colours	Away colours

Sport Club Maguary, commonly known as Maguary, is a Brazilian football club based in Fortaleza, Ceará state.

The club was founded in January 2009,

Their stadium has a maximum capacity of 3,000 people.
