= Hispano-Suiza Maguari =

Sports car

Overview
- Manufacturer: Hispano Suiza Automobilmanufaktur
- Production: 2019 (300 units planned)
- Designer: Olivier Boulay

Body and chassis
- Class: Sports car (S)
- Body style: 2-door coupe
- Layout: RMR

Dimensions
- Wheelbase: 2,850 mm (112 in)
- Length: 5,100 mm (200 in)
- Width: 2,100 mm (83 in)
- Height: 1,250 mm (49 in)
- Kerb weight: 1,780 kg (3,920 lb)

The Hispano-Suiza Maguari is a sports car developed by Hispano Suiza Automobilmanufaktur.

== History ==
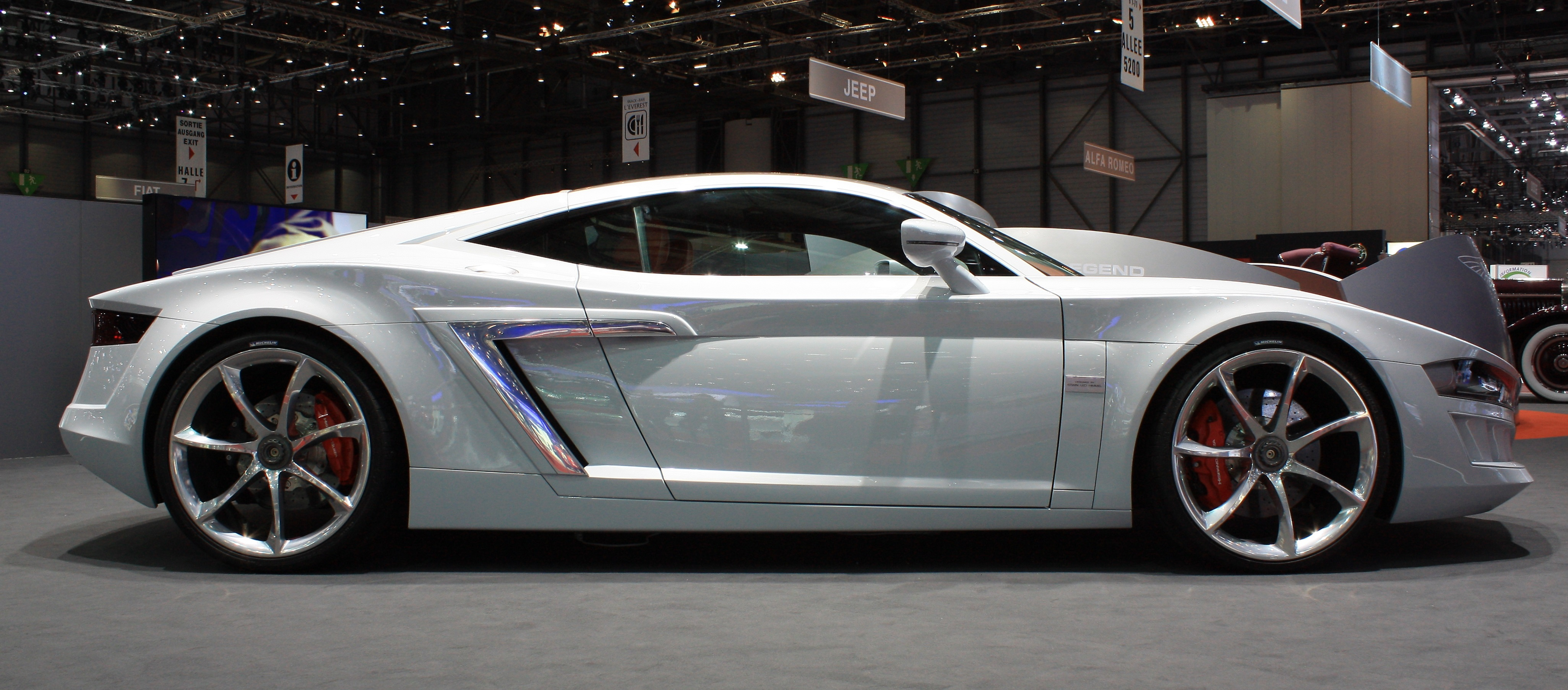
Hispano-Suiza V10 Supercharged

The Maguari was previewed by the Hispano-Suiza V10 Supercharged which was presented at the Geneva Motor Show in 2010. The Maguari was presented in March 2019. In February 2022, Hispano Suiza Engineering (HSE) filed for bankruptcy. Two prototypes of the vehicle existed at this point.

On 1 March, Hispano Suiza Automobilmanufaktur announced that series production of the 300 vehicles had started with a price tag of €2.2 million. In August, however, the insolvency administrator filed criminal charges against HSE for business and credit-damaging behavior by management, fraudulent creditors, and possibly fraud. The insolvency proceedings were completed in December and prototypes of the vehicle could not be found.

The name of the vehicle comes from the Maguari stork.

== Specifications ==
The Maguari originally intended to offer a 5.2-liter V10 mid-engine with twin turbochargers and a maximum output of 798 kW (1085 hp) from Lamborghini. The information was changed at the start of production. The production model now has a displacement of 5.5 liters and a maximum output of 883 kW (1200 hp). The Maguari accelerates to 100 km/h (62 mph) in around 2.8 seconds and the top speed is limited to 360 km/h (220 mph).
