= Volkswagen Caddy =

Range of leisure activity vehicles produced by Volkswagen

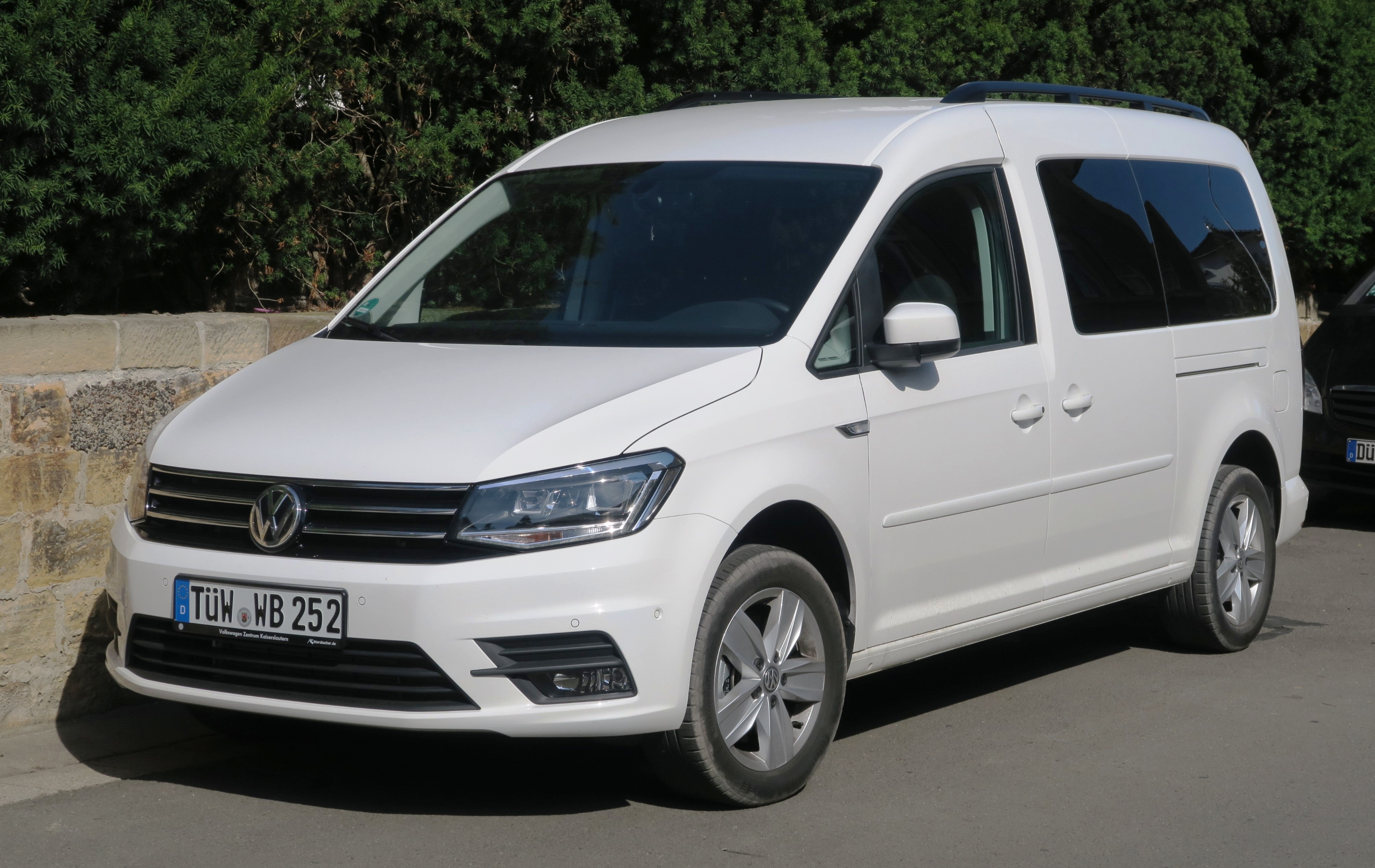
- Caddy Typ 2K with 2015 facelift

Overview
- Manufacturer: Volkswagen Group
- Also called: Volkswagen Rabbit Pickup; SEAT Inca (1996–2004); Volkswagen Van; Ford Tourneo Connect (2021–present)
- Production: 1979–present

Body and chassis
- Class: Leisure activity vehicle (M)
- Body style: 3-/4-door van 3-door panel van 4-/5-door MPV; 2-door coupé utility
- Layout: Front-engine, front-wheel-drive / four-wheel-drive (4motion)

Chronology
- Predecessor: Volkswagen Type 147
- Successor: Volkswagen Taro (for pickup models, after 1995); Volkswagen Amarok

The Volkswagen Caddy is a panel van and leisure activity vehicle (M-segment) produced by the German automaker Volkswagen Group since 1979. It is sold in Europe and in other markets around the world. The Volkswagen Caddy was first introduced in North America in 1979 and in Europe in 1982. The first and second generations also had pick-up (coupe utility) variants.

The following vehicles are related to the Volkswagen Caddy and are also manufactured by the Volkswagen Group.

- Typ 14 was derived from the Volkswagen Golf Mk1,
- Typ 9K was derived from the Volkswagen Polo Mk3 (Volkswagen Caddy) / SEAT Ibiza Mk2 (SEAT Inca) platform,
- Typ 9U was rebadged Škoda Felicia pickup,
- Typ 2K was derived from the Volkswagen Touran platform with Golf Mk5 front suspension,
- Typ SB was rebadged for the third generation of the Ford Tourneo Connect since 2021.

== First generation (Typ 14; 1979) ==
First generation (Typ 14)
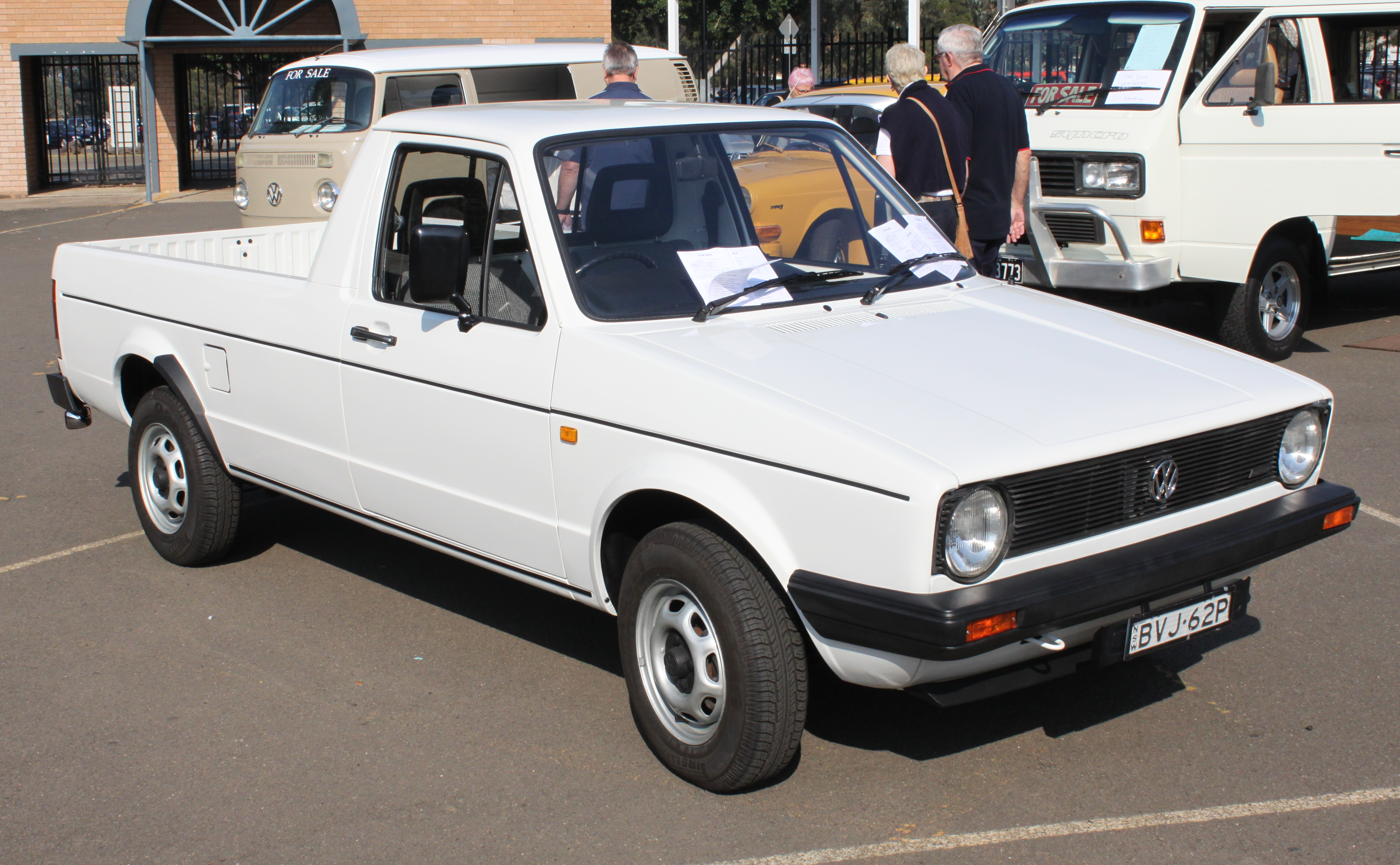

Overview
- Also called: Volkswagen Rabbit Pickup (North America)
- Production: 1979–1984 (U.S.); 1982–1992 (Yugoslavia); 1981–2007 (South Africa)
- Assembly: United States: New Stanton, Pennsylvania (Westmoreland Assembly); South Africa: Uitenhage (VWSA); Yugoslavia: Sarajevo (TAS)

Body and chassis
- Related: Volkswagen Golf Mk1; Volkswagen Jetta (A1)

Powertrain
- Engine: gasoline: 1457 cc I4; 1588 cc I4; 1715 cc I4; 1781 cc I4; diesel: 1471 cc I4; 1588 cc I4; 1588 cc turbo I4
- Transmission: 4-speed manual 5-speed manual

Dimensions
- Wheelbase: 2,625 mm (103.3 in)
- Length: 4,380 mm (172.4 in)
- Width: 1,640 mm (64.6 in)
- Height: 1,490 mm (58.7 in)
- Curb weight: 1,000–1,100 kg (2,205–2,425 lb)

Chronology
- Successor: Volkswagen Taro

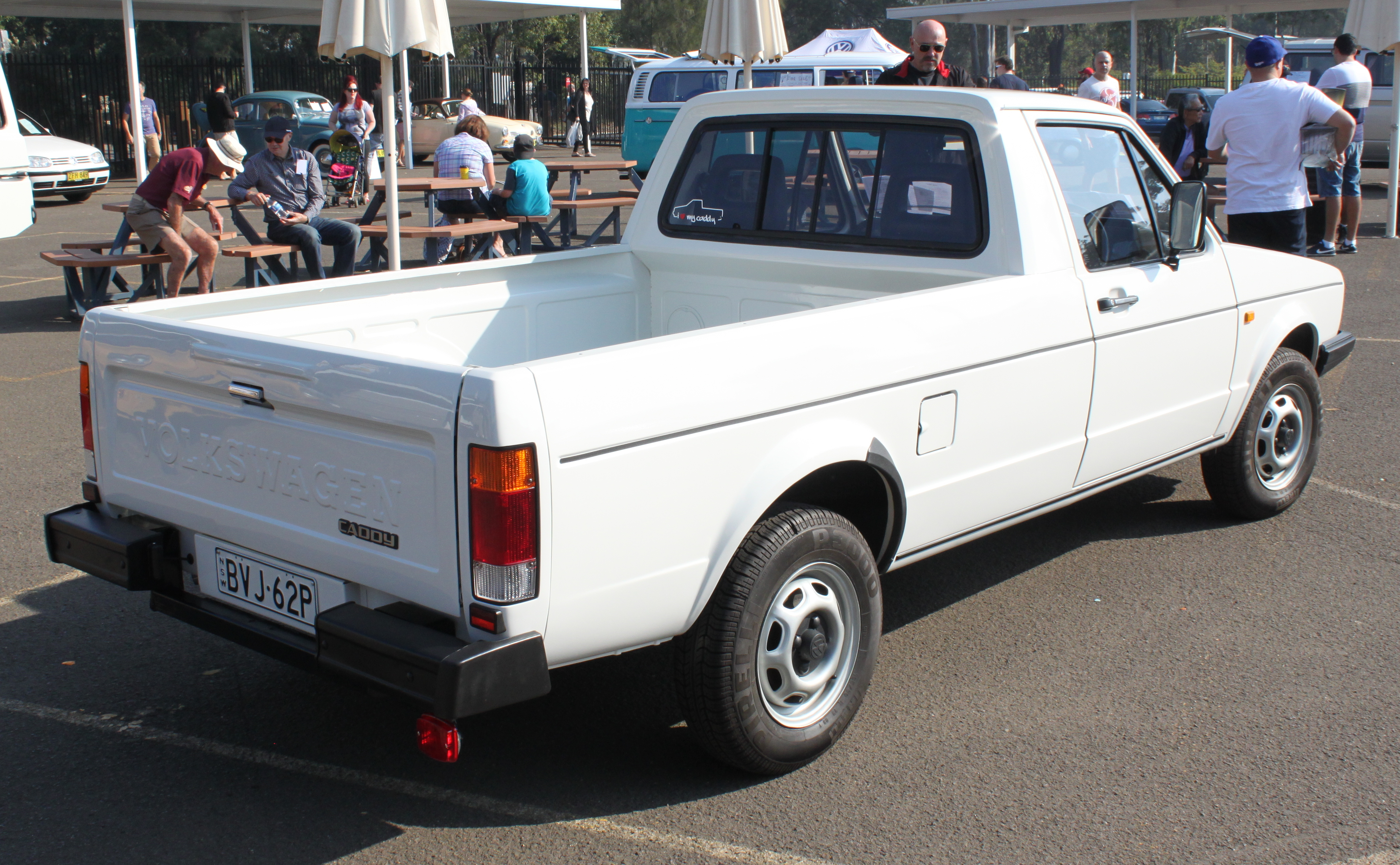
1988 Caddy rear

Released in 1979, the first Volkswagen Caddy is a coupe utility and van based on the Volkswagen Group A1 platform, shared with the small family car Volkswagen Golf Mk1.

Volkswagen Typ is:

- 147 = LHD (Left hand drive)
- 148 = RHD (Right hand drive)

=== Rabbit Pickup ===
The Caddy came to fruition when Volkswagen of America was experimenting with Golf derivatives, developing an estate and a pickup truck with a 1.83 m-long (6.0 ft) bed. VW of America's engineering team was led by Duane Miller, who acknowledged the initial design was completed in partnership with Sheller Globe.

Volkswagen of America was interested in the pickup, and Volkswagen released the Volkswagen Rabbit Pickup in North America, produced at the Volkswagen Westmoreland Assembly Plant in Pennsylvania from 1979 to 1984. Trim levels such as LX and Sportruck were available.

In North America, the Rabbit Pickup was equipped with one of two engines: originally a 1.6-litre petrol engine, joined by a 1.5-litre diesel for 1980. These were soon replaced by a 1.6 diesel with 52 hp (39 kW) or a 1.7 petrol engine with 78 hp (58 kW). One unique feature of the diesel was that it came with a five-speed gearbox, with the fifth gear, carrying a 0.76:1 ratio, labeled as E for "Economy". Fuel consumption was rated at 23 / 32 mpg_{‑US} (10.2 / 7.4 L/100 km) on the EPA city/highway cycles for the petrol engine with the four-speed manual and a corresponding 41 / 54 mpg_{‑US} (5.7 / 4.4 L/100 km) for the five-speed diesel. Observed fuel consumption for the diesel with no load and driven at a steady 35 mph (56 km/h) in fifth gear was 57.6 mpg_{‑US} (4.08 L/100 km), dropping to 38.9 mpg_{‑US} (6.05 L/100 km) at 55 mph (89 km/h). The maximum interior width of the bed was 64.4 in (1,640 mm) and the rated payload was 1,100 lb (500 kg). In Canada and many other markets outside of the United States, a turbodiesel version was also available.

The first cars under the name Rabbit Pickup were sold in the United States in late 1979 for the 1980 model year, delayed from a planned early 1979 rollout. It was not sold as the Caddy until three years later, when the model was introduced to Europe as the Caddy. Cosmetically, the North American Rabbit Pickup had rectangular headlamps, while the rest of the world received round headlamps.

The Volkswagen Rabbit Pickup competed with compact pickups, such as the Ford Courier, Datsun Truck, Toyota Hilux, Dodge Rampage and Subaru BRAT.

=== Worldwide ===
The Caddy nameplate was never used in North America. Its first use was in 1982, when the vehicle was released in Europe. European Caddys were built in Volkswagen's plant TAS in Sarajevo, Bosnia and Herzegovina (at the time SFR Yugoslavia), between 1982 and 1992. A fibreglass-reinforced plastic box cap was available to cover the open bed, turning the Caddy into a small panel van with an enclosed 2.65 m^{3} (94 cu ft) of cargo volume, and it also could be used as a caravan with an appropriate in-bed unit.

The original Caddy also was produced in Uitenhage, South Africa, from 1981 until 2007, alongside the first generation Golf itself (which was sold until 2009).

Worldwide production of the first-generation Typ 14 Rabbit Pickup/Caddy totaled more than 207,000 vehicles. For the pickup truck market, Volkswagen sold the Taro, a rebranded Toyota Hilux, from 1989 to 1997; the Caddy name continued in 1995 as a slightly smaller panel van and multi-purpose vehicle developed with Škoda and SEAT.

=== Engine specs ===
The 1979–1984 Caddy pickup used the following engines:

International

- 1.5 EA827: 51 kW (69 PS; 68 bhp), 110 N⋅m (81 lbf⋅ft) at 2500 rpm
- 1.6 EA827: 55 kW (75 PS; 74 bhp), 125 N⋅m (92 lbf⋅ft) at 2500 rpm
- 1.6 diesel EA827: 40 kW (54 hp; 54 PS), 100 N⋅m (74 lbf⋅ft) at 2300 rpm
- 1.6 turbodiesel

North America

- 1.6 49-state: EA827: 78 hp (58 kW) at 5500 rpm, 84.1 lb⋅ft (114.0 N⋅m) at 3200 rpm (1979–1980, FI)
  - 1.6 California: 76 hp (57 kW) at 5500 rpm, 82.7 lb⋅ft (112.1 N⋅m) at 3200 rpm (1979–1980, FI with catalytic converter)
- 1.7 49-state: EA827: 78 hp (58 kW) at 5500 rpm, 88.2 lb⋅ft (119.6 N⋅m) at 3000 rpm (1981–1984, FI)
  - 1.7 California: 74 hp (55 kW) at 5000 rpm, 89.6 lb⋅ft (121.5 N⋅m) at 3000 rpm (1981–1984, FI with catalytic converter)
- 1.7 petrol
- 1.5 diesel: 48 hp (36 kW) at 5000 rpm, 56.5 lb⋅ft (76.6 N⋅m) at 3000 rpm at 5000 rpm (1980)
- 1.6 diesel EA827: 52 hp (39 kW) at 4800 rpm, 71.5 lb⋅ft (96.9 N⋅m) at 3000 rpm (1981-1984)
- 1.6 turbodiesel (Canada only)

South Africa

- 1.6: 63 kW (86 PS; 84 bhp)
- 1.6: 60 kW (82 PS; 80 bhp)
- 1.8: 70 kW (95 PS; 94 bhp)
- 1.6 diesel: 44 kilowatts (60 PS; 59 bhp)

=== Gallery ===
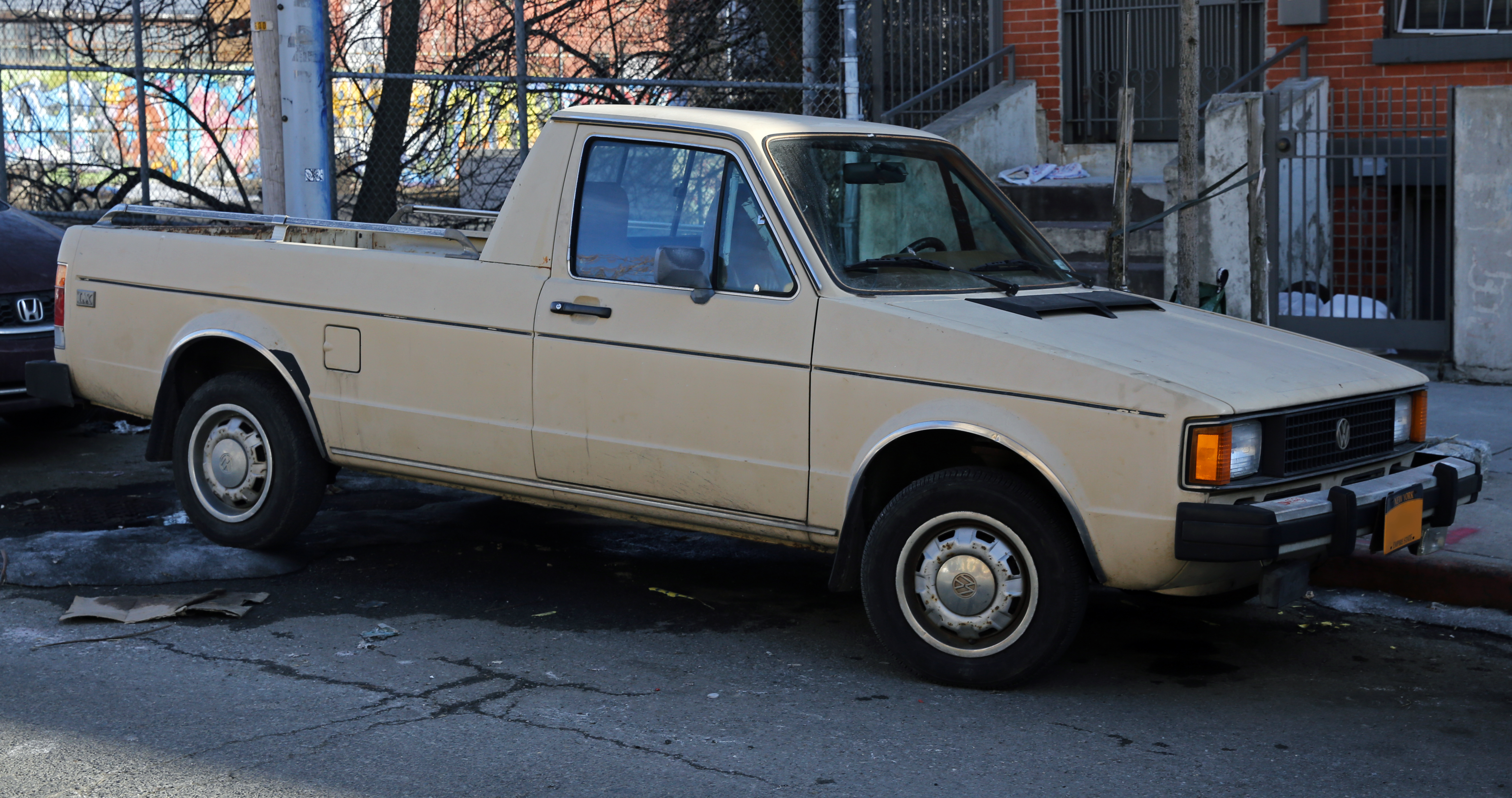
1981 Rabbit Diesel LX (US spec)

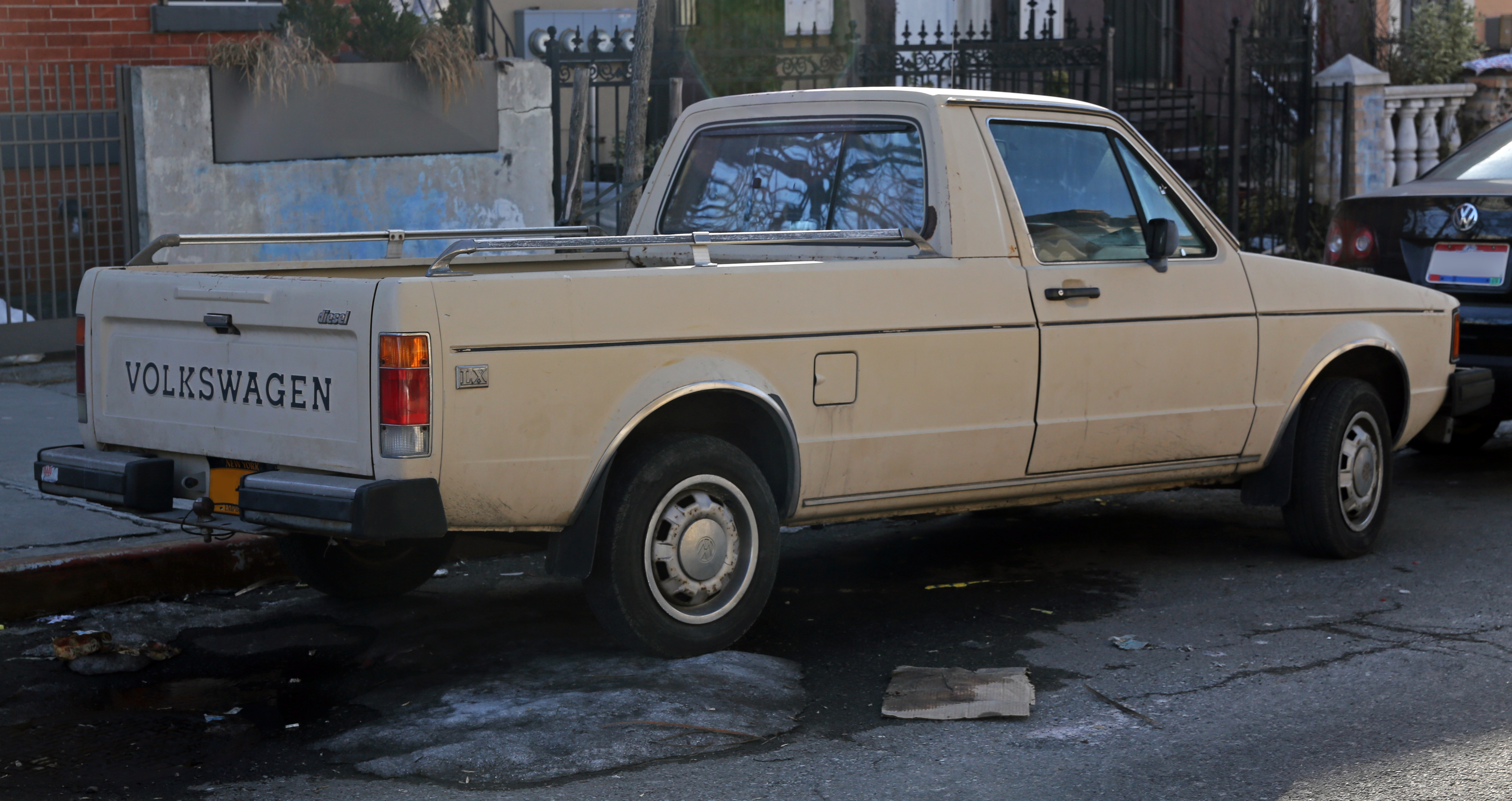
1981 Rabbit Diesel LX (US spec)

== Second generation (Typ 9K/9U; 1996) ==
Second generation
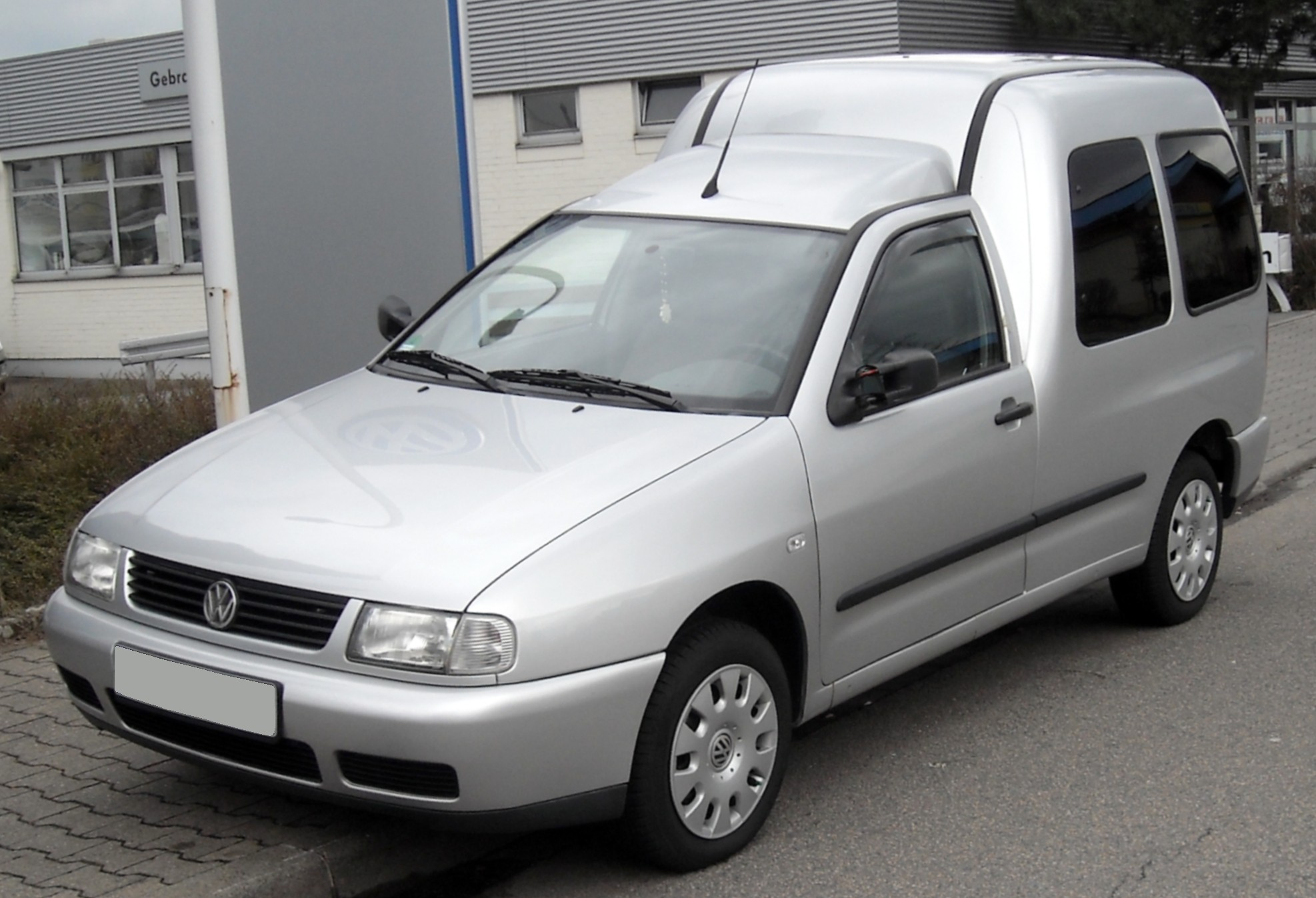

Overview
- Also called: SEAT Inca; Volkswagen Van
- Production: 1996–2004; 1996–2008 (Latin America)
- Assembly: Spain: Martorell (SEAT; 9K model); Argentina: General Pacheco (Volkswagen Argentina; 9K model); Czech Republic: Kvasiny (Škoda Auto; 9U model)

Body and chassis
- Platform: Volkswagen Group A03 platform
- Related: Volkswagen Polo Mk3; SEAT Ibiza 6K; SEAT Inca; Škoda Favorit; Škoda Felicia

Powertrain
- Engine: petrol: 1.4 L I4; 1.6 L I4; diesel: 1.7 L SDI I4; 1.9 L I4; 1.9 L TDI I4
- Transmission: 5-speed manual

Dimensions
- Wheelbase: 2,600 mm (102.4 in)
- Length: 4,206 mm (165.6 in)
- Width: 1,695 mm (66.7 in)
- Height: 1,835 mm (72.2 in)
- Curb weight: 998–1,211 kg (2,200–2,670 lb)

Released in 1995, the Volkswagen Caddy Typ 9K, or Volkswagen Polo Caddy, was a light van, designed by Volkswagen's Spanish subsidiary SEAT, and derived from the SEAT Ibiza 6K, on the Volkswagen Group A03 platform. The area of the cargo floor is 2.6 m^{2} (28 sq ft), while the loading volume is 2.9 m^{3} (102 cu ft). Typical payload is 550 kg (1,210 lb), depending on drivetrain and market specifics, and the two rear cargo doors are of a 60/40 split design. Safety features were improved from the previous generation, reflecting a changing market: Driver airbag was standard and a passenger airbag was optional, ABS and what Volkswagen called an Electronic Differential Lock (EDL) was also available. In spite of the name, EDL is not a true differential lock: sensors monitor wheel speeds, and if one is rotating substantially faster than the other (i.e., slipping), the EDL system momentarily brakes it. This effectively transfers all the power to the other wheel. Air conditioning was an available option.

It was built in Spain, at the Martorell factory of SEAT, from 1996 to 2004. Its twin, the SEAT Inca, was quickly phased out when the SEAT marque was realigned as the "sporty" branch of the Volkswagen Group.

It was in production in Argentina until 2008 for the Latin American market. In 2005 the Argentinian-made Caddy (called the Derby Van or Pointer Van, depending on the market) received a facelift which was never sold in Europe, with a front treatment similar to that of the Polo Classic (6K; 2004 facelift).

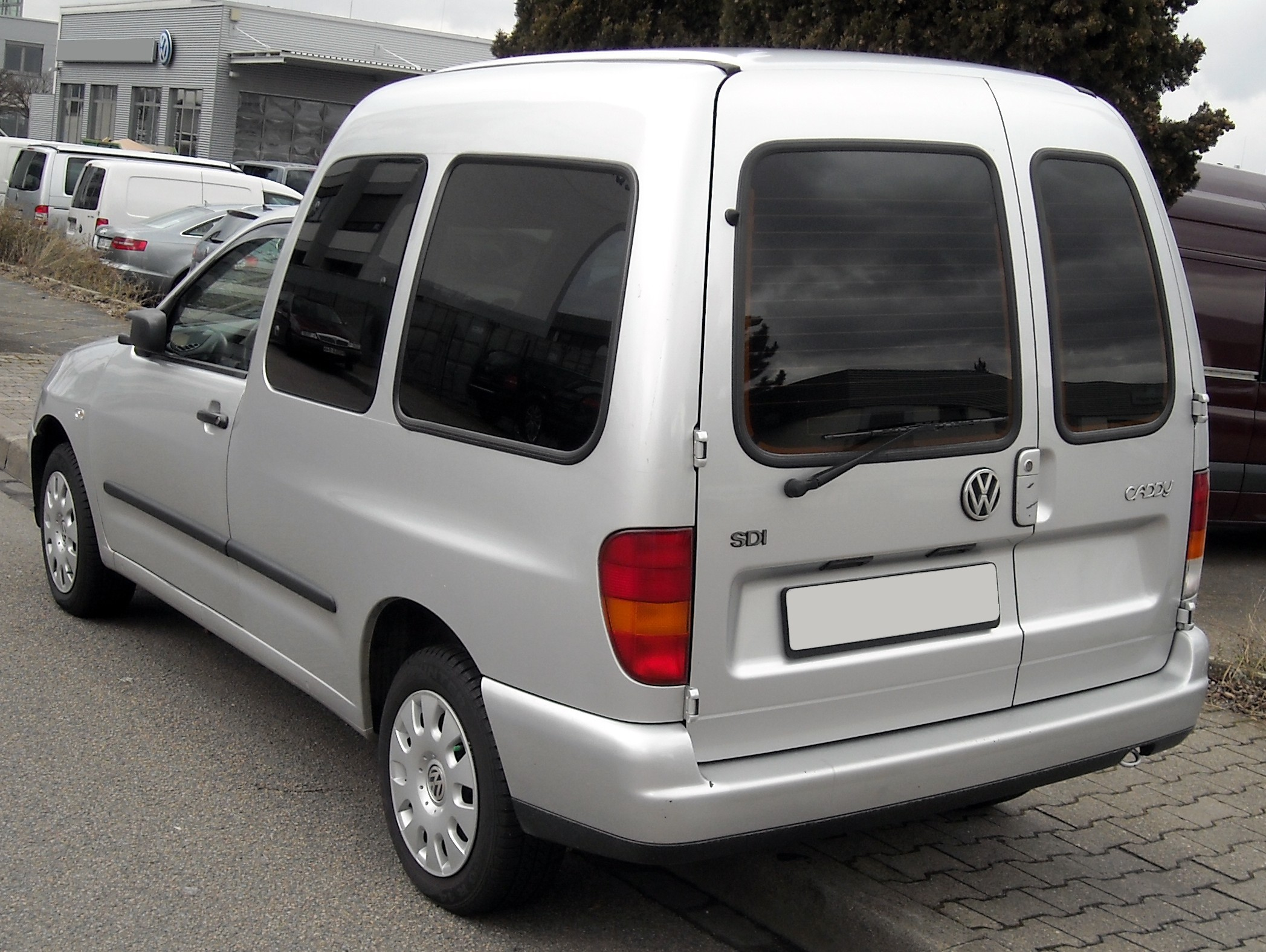
Caddy II (Typ 9KV)

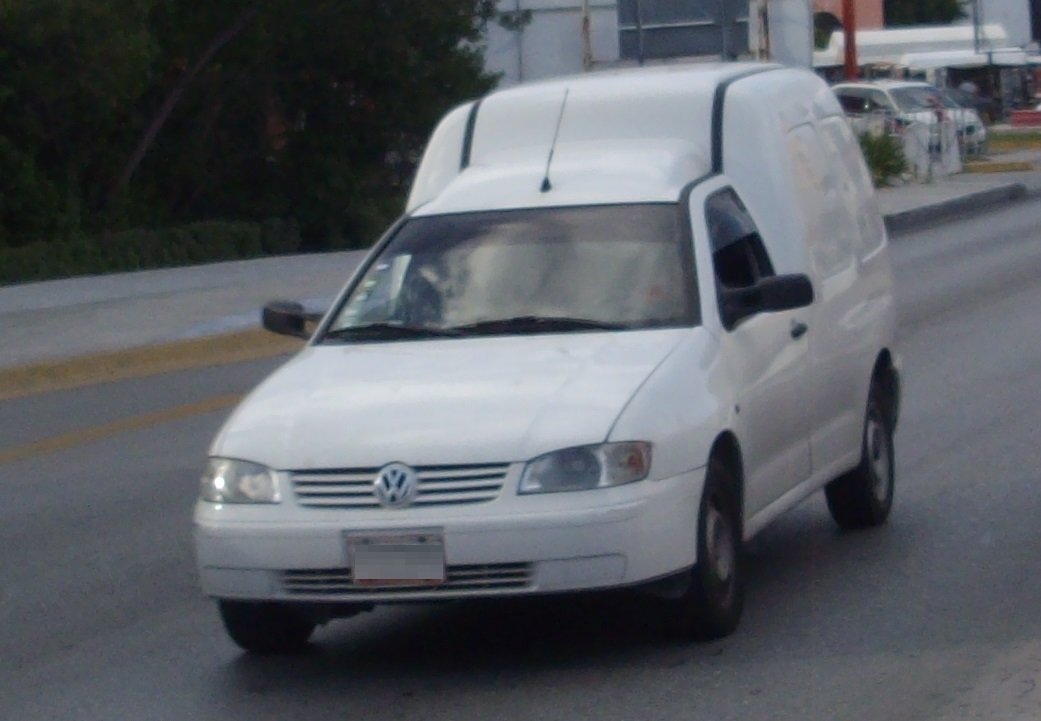
The facelifted, Argentine-built Caddy, also sold as the Derby Van or Pointer Van

=== Engines ===
1996–2003 MY Engines
Model designation	Engine code	Displacement	engine configuration	Max. power at rpm (Directive 80/1269/EEC)	Max. torque at rpm	0–100 km/h (62 mph)	Top speed	Years
Petrol engines
1.4 MPI	AEX, APQ	1.4 L (1,390 cc)	I4 SOHC 8v	44 kW (60 PS; 59 hp) @ 4,700	116 N⋅m (86 lb⋅ft) @ 2,800–3,200	18.8 sec	142 km/h (88 mph)	1996–2004
1.4 MPI	AUA	1.4 L (1,390 cc)	I4 DOHC 16v	55 kW (75 PS; 74 hp) @ 5,000	126 N⋅m (93 lb⋅ft) @ 3,800	14.9 sec	152 km/h (94 mph)	2000–2004
1.6 SPI	1F	1.6 L (1,595 cc)	I4 SOHC 8v	55 kW (75 PS; 74 hp) @ 5,500	125 N⋅m (92 lb⋅ft) @ 2,600	17.5 sec	153 km/h (95 mph)	1995–1997
1.6 MPI	AEE	1.6 L (1,598 cc)	I4 SOHC 8v	55 kW (75 PS; 74 hp) @ 4,800	135 N⋅m (100 lb⋅ft) @ 2,800–3,600	16.6 sec	153 km/h (95 mph)	1997–2000
Diesel engines
1.7 SDI	AHB	1.7 L (1,716 cc)	I4 SOHC 8v	42 kW (57 PS; 56 hp) @ 4,200	112 N⋅m (83 lb⋅ft) @ 2,200–2,600			1996–2000
1.9 D	1Y	1.9 L (1,896 cc)	I4 SOHC 8v	47 kW (64 PS; 63 hp) @ 4,400	124 N⋅m (91 lb⋅ft) @ 2,000–3,000	20.6 sec	144 km/h (89 mph)	1996–2004
1.9 SDI	AEY, AYQ	1.9 L (1,896 cc)	I4 SOHC 8v	47 kW (64 PS; 63 hp) @ 4,200	125 N⋅m (92 lb⋅ft) @ 2,200–2,800	20.1 sec	144 km/h (89 mph)	1996–2004
1.9 TDI	1Z, AHU	1.9 L (1,896 cc)	I4 SOHC 8v	66 kW (90 PS; 89 hp) @ 4,000	202 N⋅m (149 lb⋅ft) @ 1,900	14.4 sec	162 km/h (101 mph)	1996–2000
1.9 TDI	ALE, ALH	1.9 L (1,896 cc)	I4 SOHC 8v	66 kW (90 PS; 89 hp) @ 3,750	210 N⋅m (155 lb⋅ft) @ 1,900	14.4 sec	162 km/h (101 mph)	1997–2004

=== Caddy Typ 9U ===
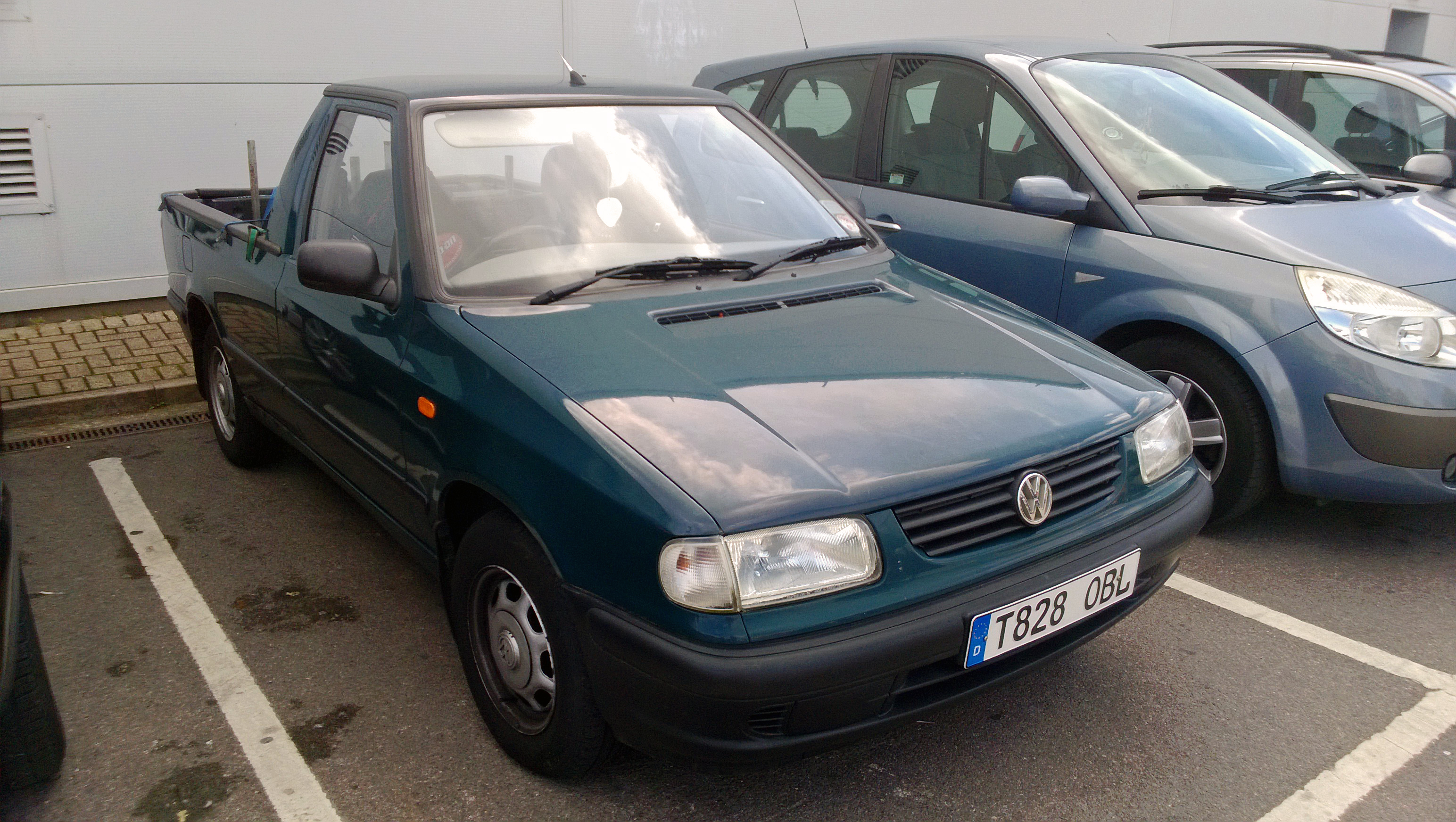
Volkswagen Caddy (9U) 1.9D SD

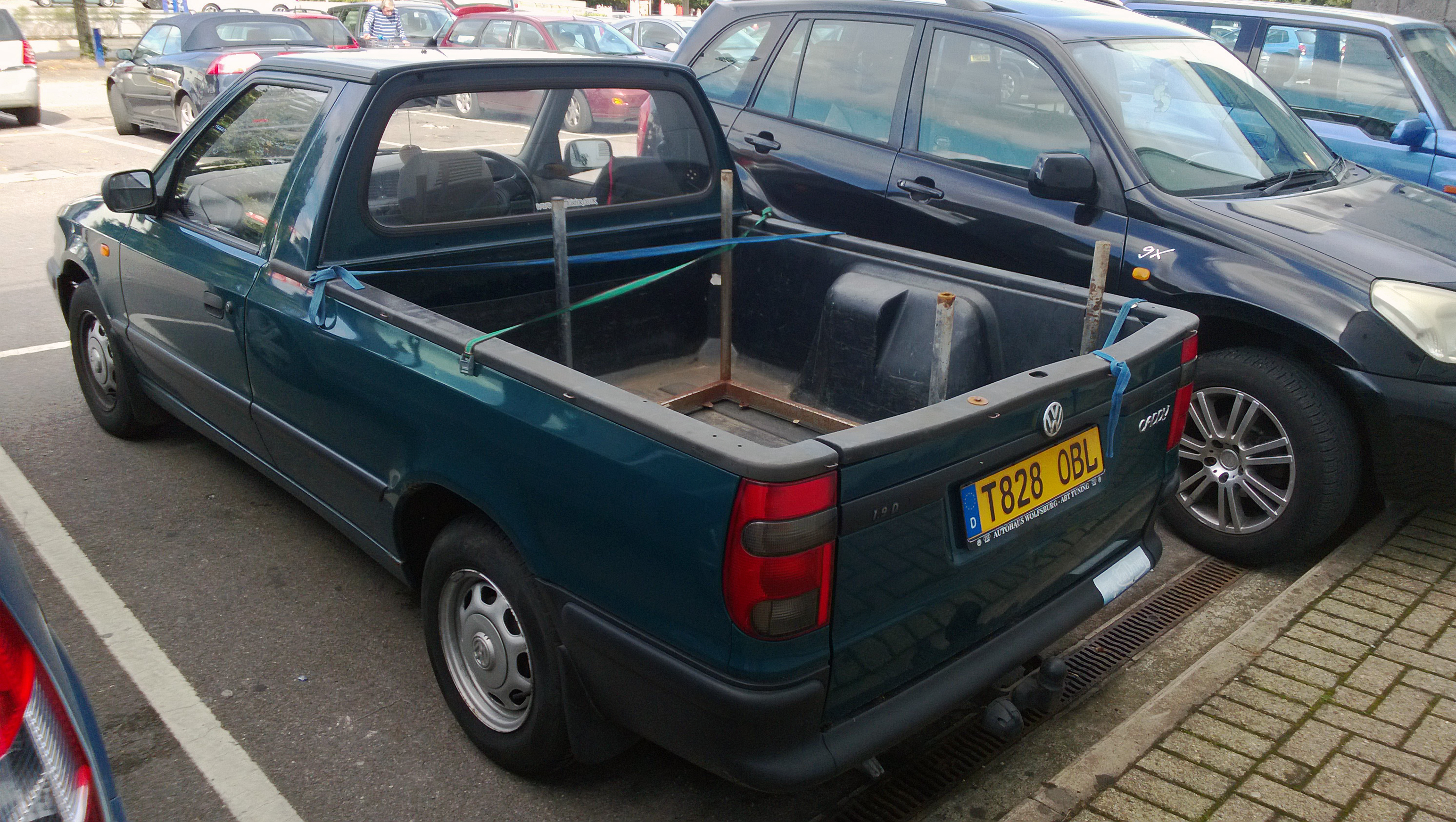
Volkswagen Caddy (9U) 1.9D SD

Released in 1996 to complement the pickup-bodied Typ 9K Caddy range, the rebadged Škoda Felicia Utility was the entry level light commercial vehicle for the VWCV range.

The Typ 9U Caddy was built in Škoda Auto's Kvasiny, Czech Republic, plant.

Engines
Model designation	Engine code	Displacement	engine configuration	Max. power at rpm (Directive 80/1269/EEC)	Max. torque at rpm	0–100 km/h (62 mph)	Top speed	Years
Petrol engines
1.6 MPI	AEE	1.6 L (1,598 cc)	I4 SOHC 8v	55 kW (75 PS; 74 hp) @ 4,500	135 N⋅m (100 lb⋅ft) @ 3,500	12.5 sec	161 km/h (100 mph)	1996–2000
Diesel engines
1.9 D	AEF	1.9 L (1,896 cc)	I4 SOHC 8v	47 kW (64 PS; 63 hp) @ 4,300	124 N⋅m (91 lb⋅ft) @ 3,000	16.5 s	150 km/h (93 mph)	1996–2000

Features of Typ 9U Caddy

- 530 kg (1,170 lb) payload rating
- 2.0 m^{2} loading area
- length: 4.12 m (13.5 ft)
- width: 1.64 m (5.4 ft)
- turning circle: 11.2 m (37 ft)
- 3 point seatbelts
- option of twin airbags
- option of ABS brakes
- option of air conditioning, standard in Petrol engined models.

=== Safety ===
Euro NCAP test results* Volkswagen Caddy 'Life' 1.9 TDI (LHD) (2007)
Test	Score	Rating
Adult occupant:	27	4 /5 stars
Child occupant:	30	3 /5 stars
Pedestrian:	13	2 /4 stars

== Third generation (Typ 2K; 2003) ==
Third generation
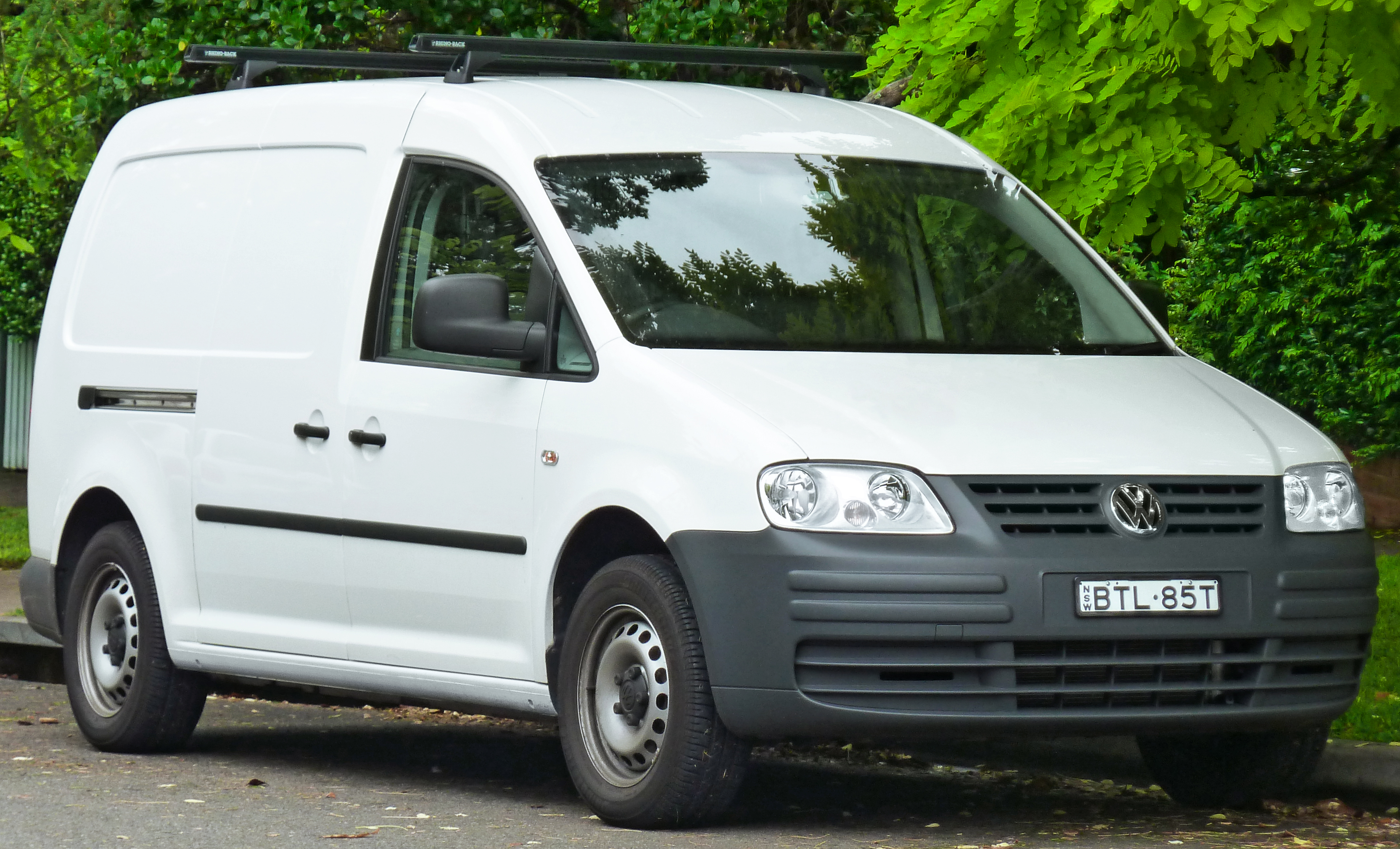

Overview
- Also called: Škoda Roomster (cancelled)
- Production: 2003–2021 (Poland, Russia); 2004–2008 (China); 2017–2019 (Algeria); 2019–present (Kenya)
- Assembly: Poland: Poznań (Volkswagen Poznań Sp. z o.o.); Russia: Kaluga (Volkswagen Group Rus); China: Changchun (FAW-VW); Algeria: Relizane (SOVAC VW); Kenya: Thika (Kenya Vehicle Manufacturers (KVM); since 2019)

Body and chassis
- Related: Volkswagen Touran Mk1

Powertrain
- Engine: petrol: 1.0 L EA211 TSI I3; 1.2 L TSI I4; 1.4 L 16V I4; 1.6 L I4; CNG: 2.0 L EcoFuel I4; diesel: 1.6 L TDI I4; 1.9 L TDI I4; 2.0 L SDI I4; 2.0 L EA189 TDI I4
- Transmission: 5-speed manual 6-speed manual 6-speed dual-clutch 7-speed dual-clutch

Dimensions
- Wheelbase: 2,600 mm (102.4 in)
- Length: 4,405–4,875 mm (173.4–191.9 in)
- Width: 1,795 mm (70.7 in)
- Height: 1,832 mm (72.1 in)
- Curb weight: 1,436–1,790 kg (3,166–3,946 lb)

The third generation of Volkswagen Caddy debuted in October 2003, at the RAI Commercial Vehicle Show in Amsterdam, with production at Poznań commencing in November 2003.

The Typ 2K shares 50% of its modules with the Volkswagen Golf Mk5 and Volkswagen Touran. The new model Caddy has a more aerodynamic design, the angle of the windscreen and A pillar is more horizontal, making the dashboard bigger and the bonnet (hood) smaller.

There are two body sizes: "normal" and Maxi. These can both be configured as a Panel Van, a Window Panel Van, Kombi (spartan passenger version), Caddy Life (family version), and a Camping version called the Caddy Tramper or Caddy Life Camper.

A Caddy Life or Kombi seats up to five in two rows while a Caddy Life Maxi or Kombi Maxi seats up to seven in three rows. The Life version has interior trimmings like that of a conventional five seater wagon while the Kombi is a naked panel van with windows and seats. The difference in road noise between the two is described by some as substantial.

=== Caddy Panel (2010–2021) ===
The Caddy Panel grew in size over the Caddy Typ 9K, it measures 4,405 mm (173.4 in) in length, width 1,802 mm (70.9 in), height 1,833 mm (72.2 in), and wheelbase 2,682 mm (105.6 in). It has a 750 kg (1,653 lb) payload, and a loading volume of 3.2 m^{3} (110 cu ft). The current shape Typ 2K Caddy, on sale in Europe since 2003, is a leisure activity vehicle with Volkswagen Golf Mk5 front suspension.

It resembles the compact MPV Touran, and is assembled at the Poznań factory in Poland. In May 2007, British Gas signed a landmark deal which saw 1,000 vans being supplied to the firm, which were fitted with a bespoke racking system and a speed limiter, designed by Siemens. The deal was renewed in September 2015.

=== Caddy Life ===
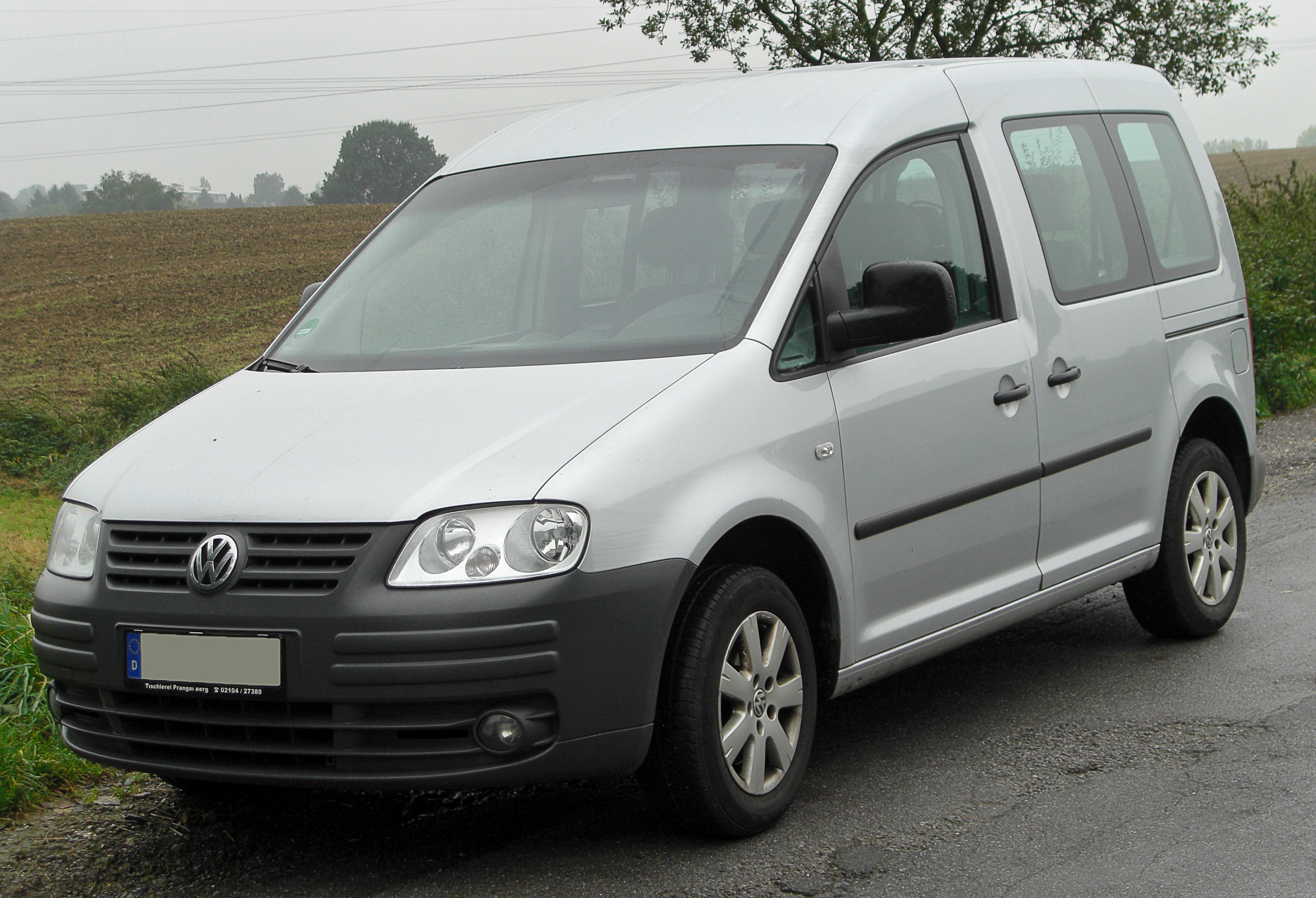
Caddy Life

The Caddy Life, a seven-seat passenger oriented People Mover, debuted at the 2004 Geneva Motor Show. It comes with twin sliding doors and a 608 kg (1,340 lb) payload.

The Caddy Life has a flexible seating system. The two rear bench seat rows can be taken out of the vehicle altogether to give the vehicle 2850 litres of cargo room; in addition, the Caddy Life has a 1,500 kg (3,307 lb) towing capacity.

In 2005, a Special Edition Caddy Life Colour Concept with two distinctive colours, Red Spice and Ravenna Blue, was released with upholstery fabrics, floor mats and a variety of other elements on the dash panel in the same colour as the exterior body, and a leather trimmed steering wheel, gear and handbrake lever.

=== Caddy Maxi and Caddy Maxi Life ===
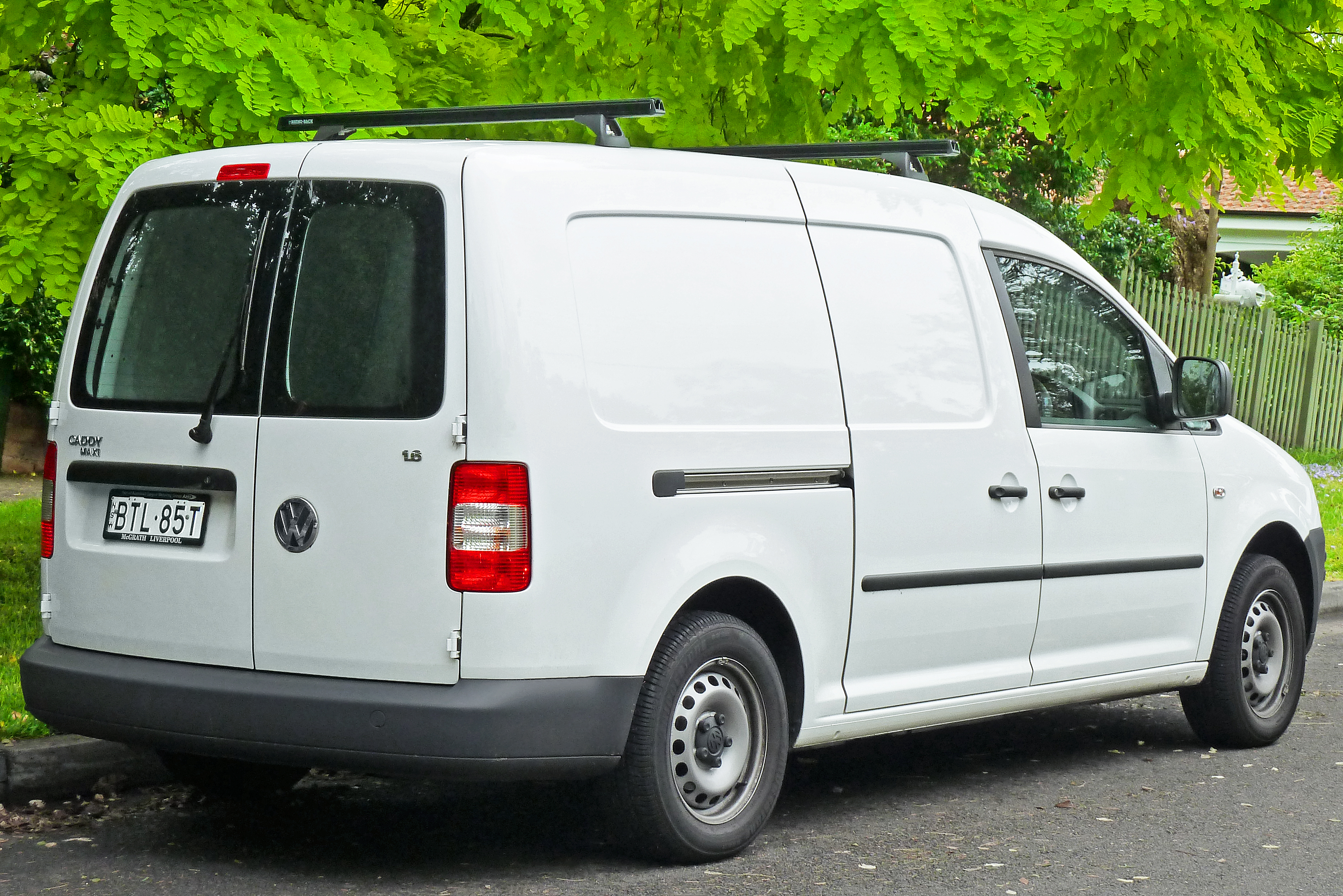
Caddy Maxi

Debuting at the 2007 Frankfurt Motor Show, Volkswagen Commercial Vehicles presented the Caddy Maxi Life the people mover version of the Maxi range. The Caddy Maxi range carried over all of the Caddy engine and debuted the 2.0L TDI engine producing 103 kW (138 hp; 140 PS).

The Caddy Maxi family is 470 mm (19 in) longer version of the Caddy with 4.2 m^{3} loading space, this is due to extensions of the wheelbase which measures 3,002 mm (118.2 in) an extended, rear overhang became 151 mm (5.9 in) in length, plus the growth between the sliding doors and the rear axle at 319 mm (12.6 in) and payload is up to 800 kg (1,764 lb) to 810 kg (1,786 lb) on commercial versions.

The Caddy Maxi Tramper, the camping version of the Caddy Maxi, debuted at the 2008 AMI Leipzig Motor Show along with the Caddy Maxi EcoFuel Study.

=== Caddy Life Tramper (Camper) ===
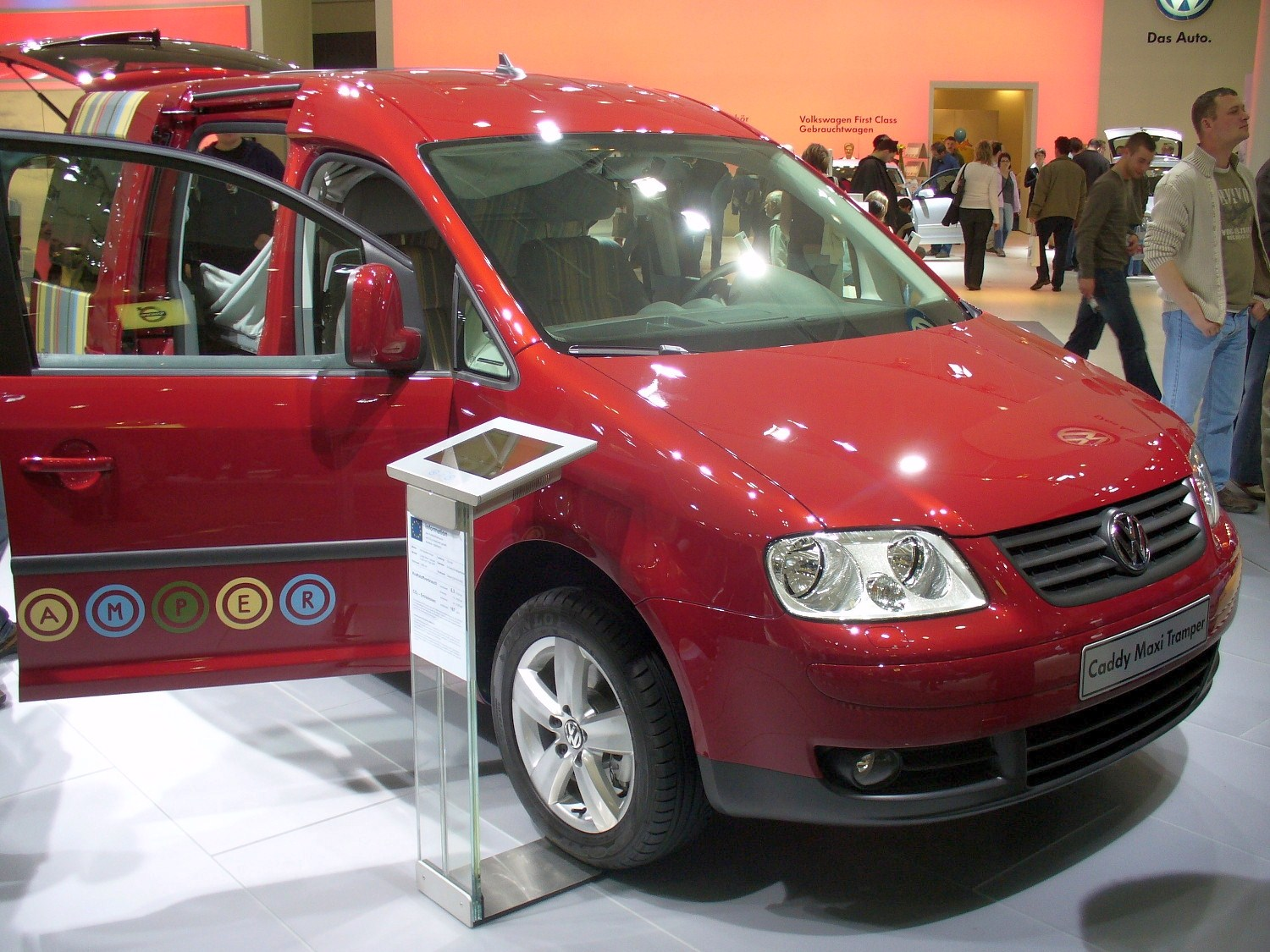
Caddy Life Tramper

Based on the Caddy Life the Tramper or Camper (Australia) package comes with two seats and a table, a fold out awning that is packaged within the rear tailgate, a bed that is made by folding down the seats measures 1.10 m x 2.0 m, also curtains are standard for privacy, options include a seven-litre cool box.

=== Carrera Cup Edition ===
The Caddy Carrera Cup Edition is a limited (250 units) version for the Swedish market. It is based on the 2.0-litre TDi model with black 17-inch wheels with 225/45R17 tyres, a new body kit, white body with red trim, black and red leather sport seats, a fire extinguisher under the passenger's seat, and a sport leather steering wheel and gear knob.

=== Caddy 4Motion ===
At the 2008 IAA (Hannover Motor Show), Volkswagen Commercial Vehicles revealed the all-wheel drive Caddy 4Motion range teamed with the 1.9 TDI engine and manual transmission.

Early in 2010, the Caddy Maxi range will receive the 4Motion drivetrain.

=== Caddy in Australia ===
Since its introduction in the Australian market in 2003, the Caddy range has taken the market lead for small vans, with a 42% share in 2007. Even with the more premium pricing over its competition, buyers are still willing to pay more for the TDI and DSG transmission options.

=== Awards ===
- Professional Van and Light Truck Magazine Small Van of the Year 2007 (United Kingdom)
- Van Fleet World Best Small Van 2007 (United Kingdom)
- Fleet News – 2008 Best Small Van Award
- Professional Van and Light Truck Magazine Small Van of the Year 2008 (United Kingdom) – Caddy Maxi
- Delivery Magazine Award – 2008 Best Small Van Caddy Maxi
- What Van? (United Kingdom) – Editor's Choice 2008 Caddy Maxi

=== Engines ===
- 1.2 TSI – 86 PS (63 kW; 85 hp) – 160 N⋅m (118 lb⋅ft) (petrol)
- 1.2 TSI – 105 PS (77 kW; 104 hp) – 175 N⋅m (129 lb⋅ft) (petrol)
- 1.4 16V – 75 PS (55 kW; 74 hp) – 126 N⋅m (93 lb⋅ft) (petrol) (discontinued)
- 1.4 16V – 80 PS (59 kW; 79 hp) – 132 N⋅m (97 lb⋅ft) (petrol) (discontinued)
- 1.6 8V – 102 PS (75 kW; 101 hp) – 148 N⋅m (109 lb⋅ft) (petrol) (discontinued)
- 1.6 TDI – 75 PS (55 kW; 74 hp) – 225 N⋅m (166 lb⋅ft) (diesel)
- 1.6 TDI – 102 PS (75 kW; 101 hp) – 250 N⋅m (184 lb⋅ft) (diesel)
- 1.9 TDI – 75 PS (55 kW; 74 hp) – 210 N⋅m (155 lb⋅ft) (diesel) (discontinued)
- 1.9 TDI – 105 PS (77 kW; 104 hp) – 250 N⋅m (184 lb⋅ft) (diesel) (discontinued)
- 2.0 SDI – 69 PS (51 kW; 68 hp) – 140 N⋅m (103 lb⋅ft) (diesel) (only for panel van and panel window van) (discontinued)
- 2.0 TDI – 102 PS (75 kW; 101 hp)
- 2.0 TDI – 110 PS (81 kW; 110 hp) – 290 N⋅m (214 lb⋅ft) (diesel)
- 2.0 TDI – 140 PS (103 kW; 138 hp) – 320 N⋅m (236 lb⋅ft) (diesel)
- 2.0 TDI – 170 PS (125 kW; 168 hp) – 350 N⋅m (258 lb⋅ft) (diesel) (only for Caddy Maxi)
- 2.0 EcoFuel – 109 PS (80 kW; 108 hp) – 160 N⋅m (118 lb⋅ft) (CNG)

Caddy Typ 2K engines
Model	Years	Type	Code	Output (@RPM)		Consumption	CO_{2} emissions
Model	Years	Type	Code	Power	Torque	Consumption	CO_{2} emissions
Diesel engines
2.0TDI 102PS		1,968 cc (120.1 cu in) I4, turbocharged	EA189	102 PS (75 kW; 101 hp) (@2900–4000)	250 N⋅m (184 lbf⋅ft) (@1300-2800)	6.6–5.7 L/100 km (36–41 mpg_{‑US})	137–146 g/km (7.8–8.3 oz/mi)
2.0TDI 150PS		1,968 cc (120.1 cu in) I4, turbocharged	EA189	150 PS (110 kW; 148 hp) (@3500–4000)	340 N⋅m (251 lbf⋅ft) (@1750-3000)	6.8–6.2 L/100 km (35–38 mpg_{‑US})	139–146 g/km (7.9–8.3 oz/mi)
Petrol engines
1.0TSI 102PS		999 cc (61.0 cu in) I3, turbocharged	EA211	102 PS (75 kW; 101 hp) (@5000–5500)	175 N⋅m (129 lbf⋅ft) (@2000-3500)	7.6–7.0 L/100 km (31–34 mpg_{‑US})	135–141 g/km (7.7–8.0 oz/mi)

=== Facelift ===
==== 2010 ====
Towards the end of 2010, the Caddy underwent a facelift to match the new design language of Volkswagen vehicles. Changes included a front with new headlights and grille from the facelifted Touran Mk1 which is similar to the Volkswagen Golf Mk6.

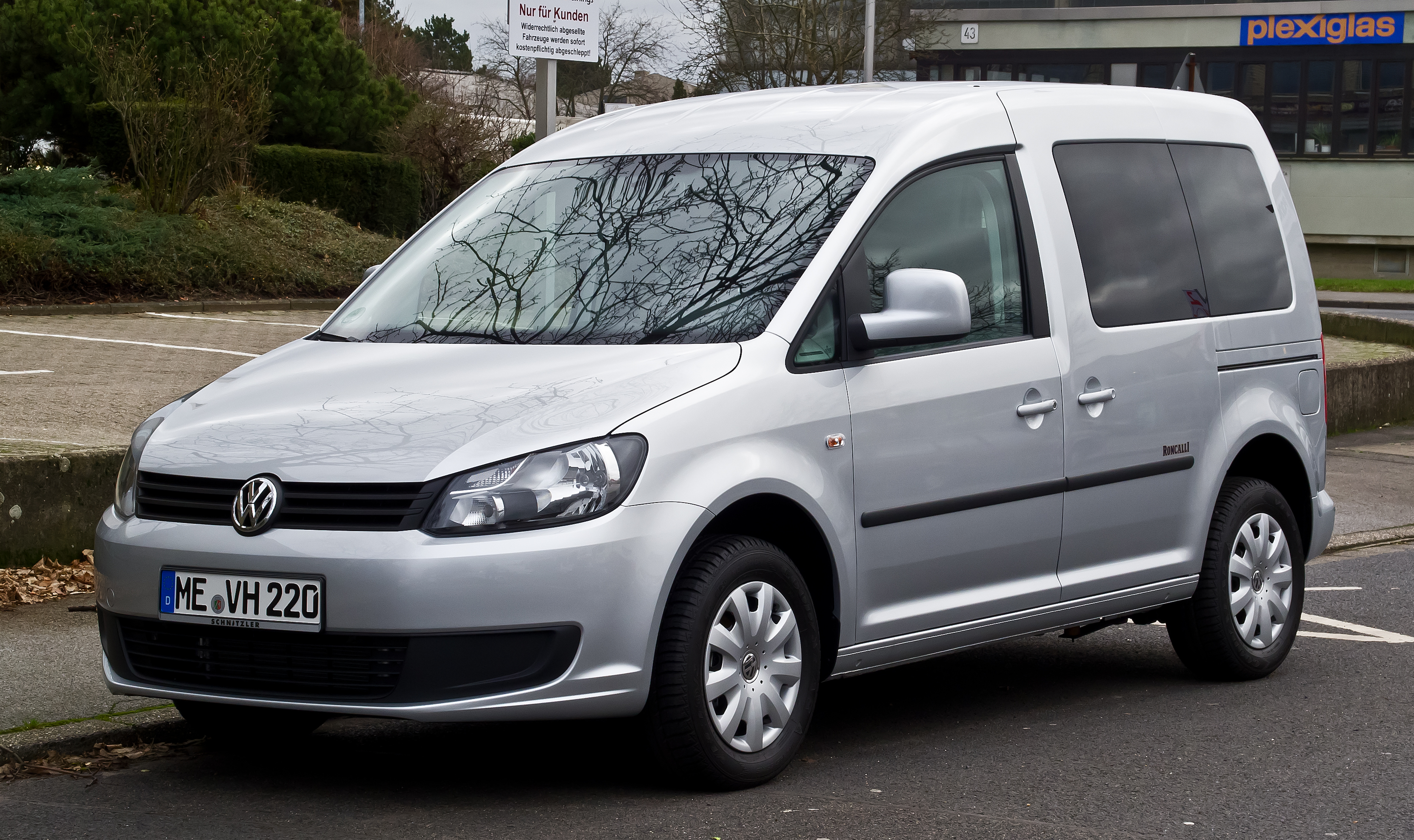
Caddy Maxi (first facelift)

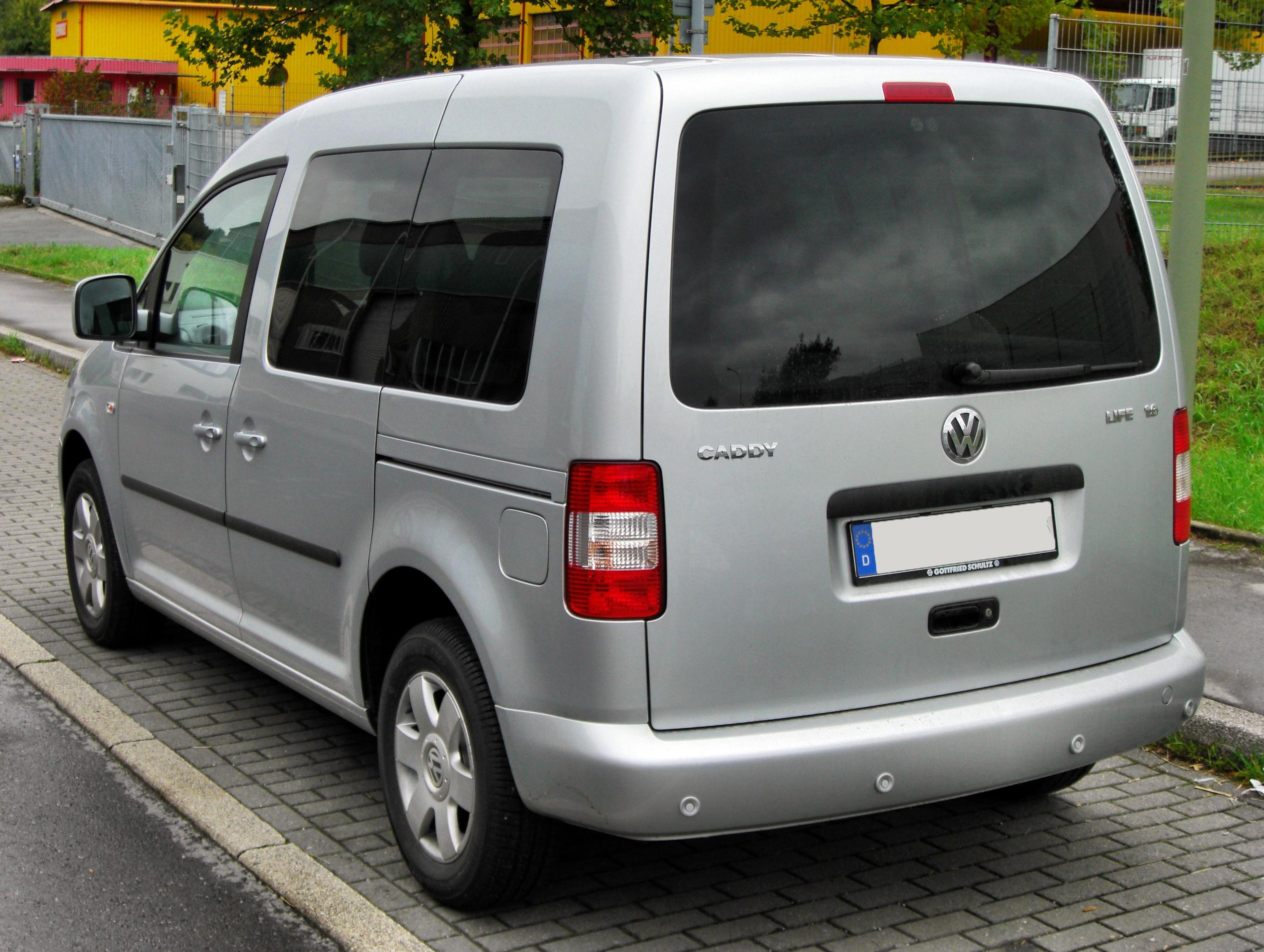
Rear View

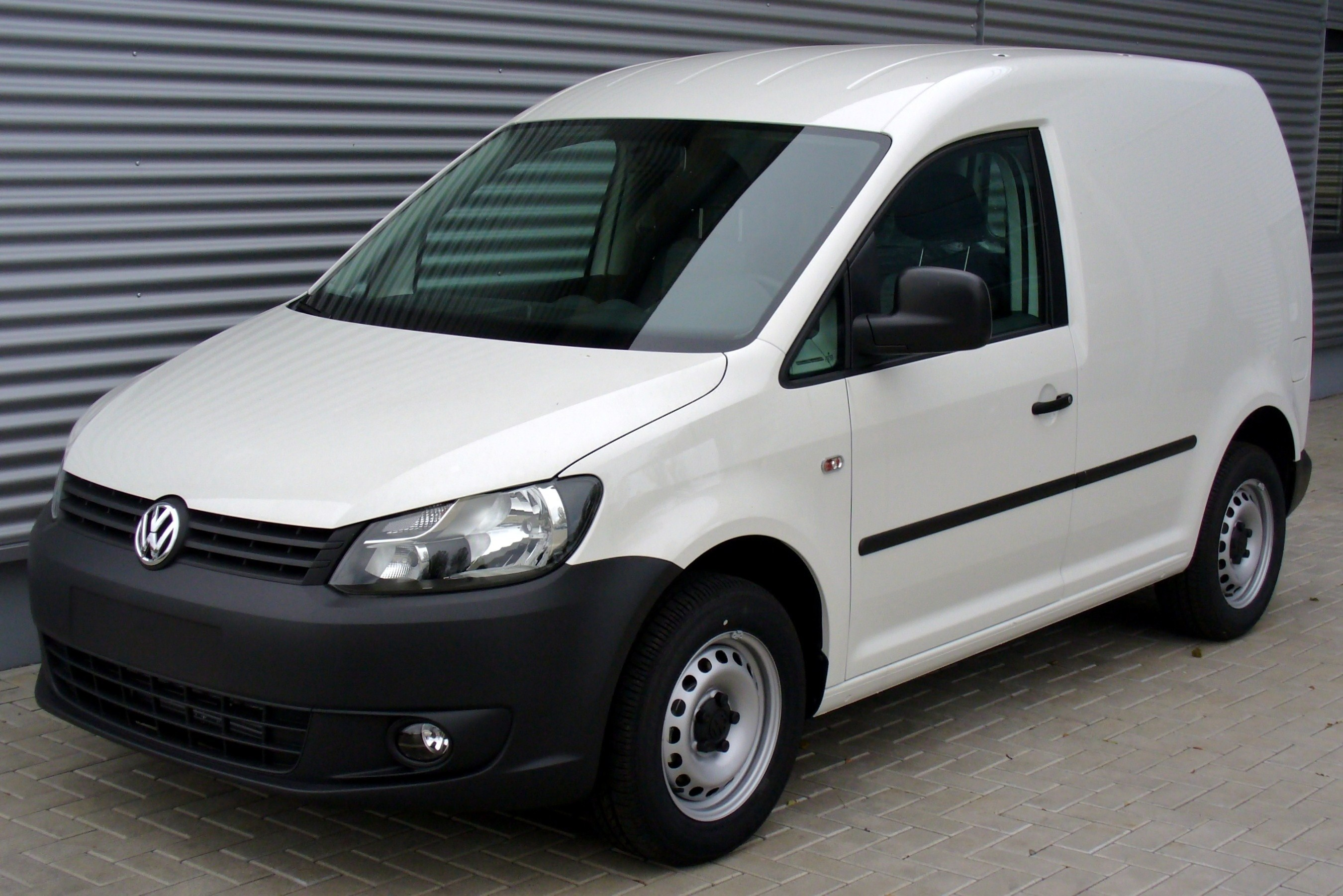
Caddy Cargo (first Facelift)

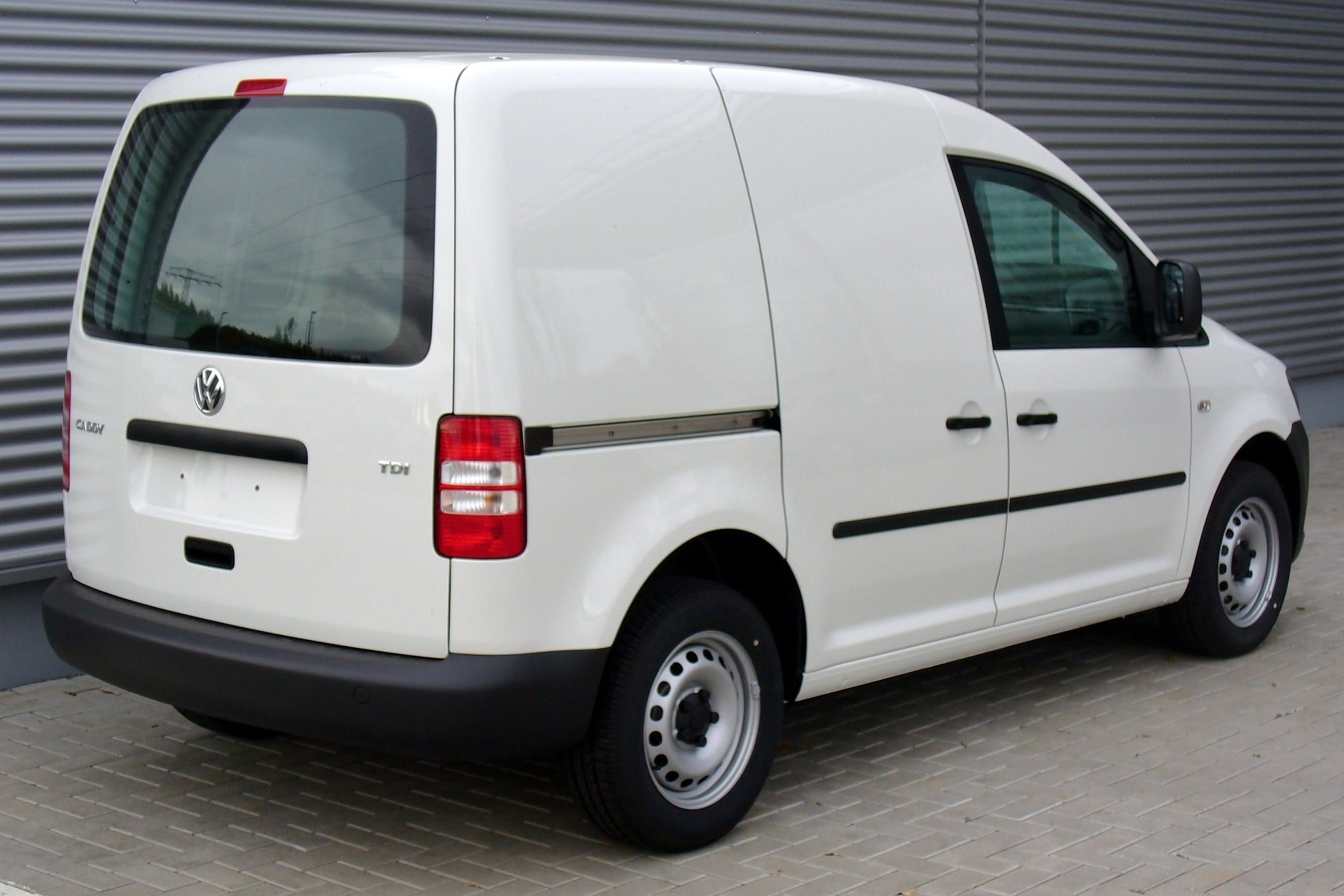
Rear View

==== 2015 ====
In 2015, it underwent a second facelift consisting of a new front fascia, roof spoiler and a new interior to keep it competitive alongside its more modern rivals. Referred to as Caddy 2K SA (or Mk4/MkIV), but it may be differentiated when compared to the new Touran front end.

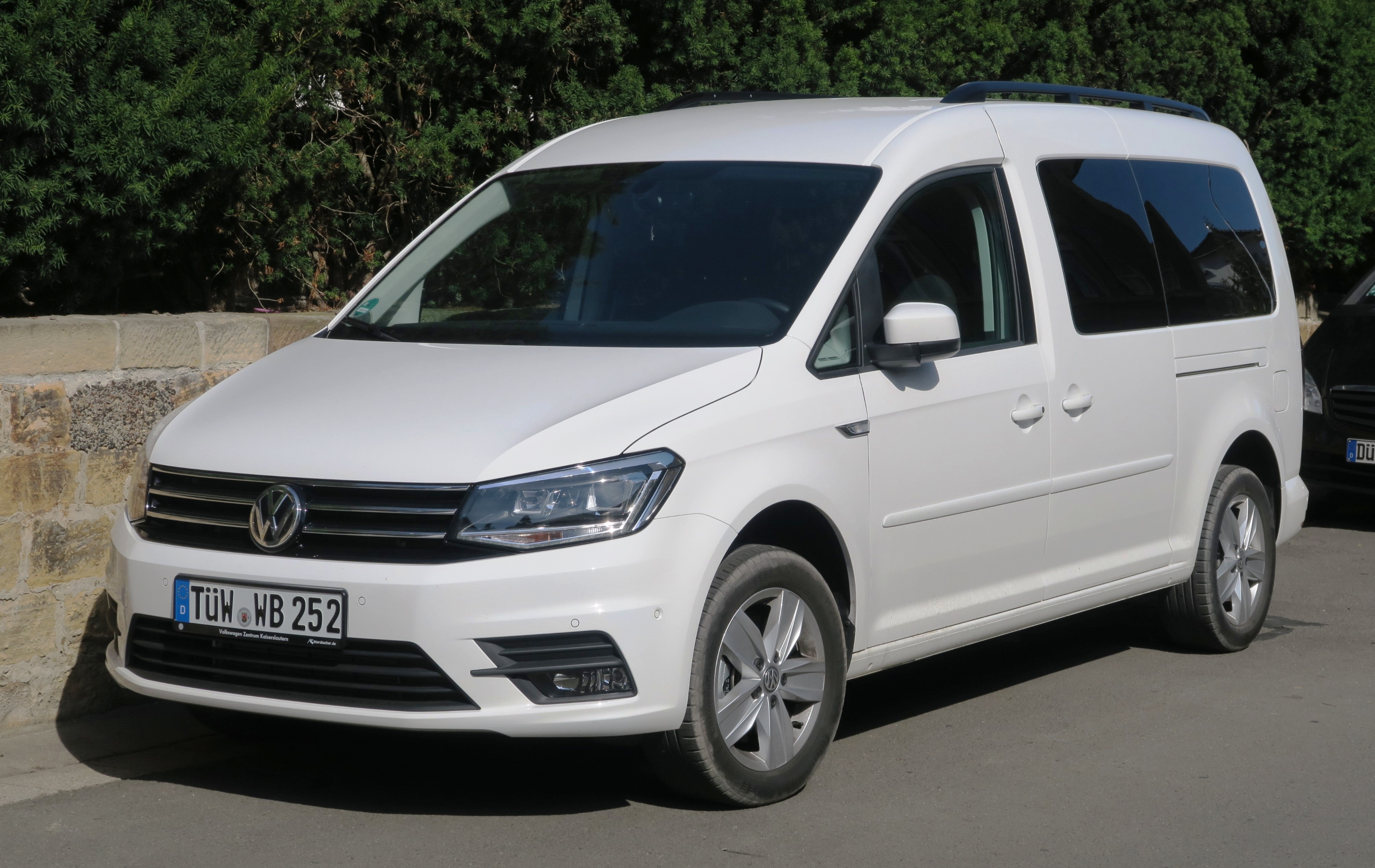
Caddy Maxi (second facelift)

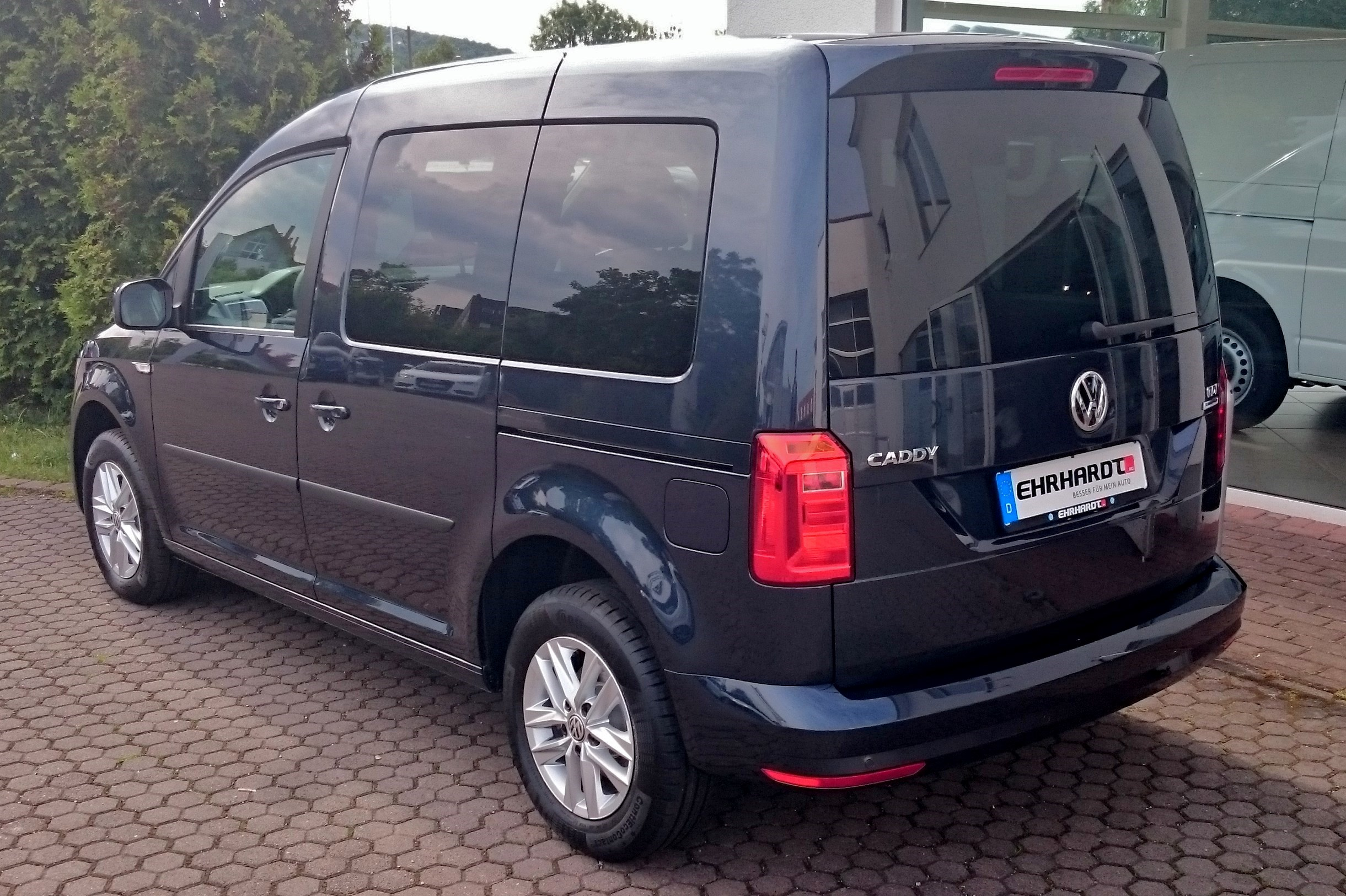
Rear View

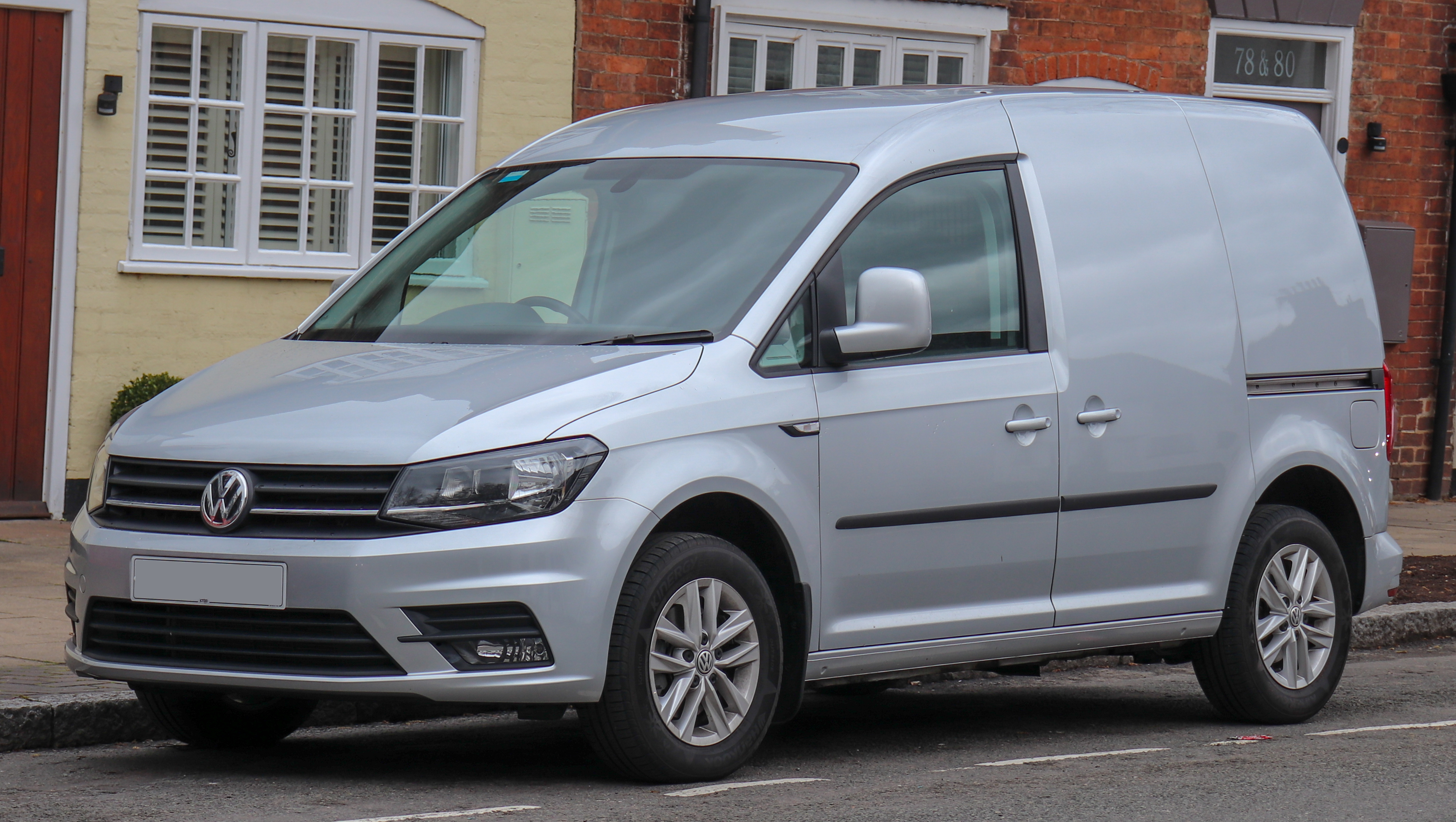
Caddy Cargo (second Facelift)

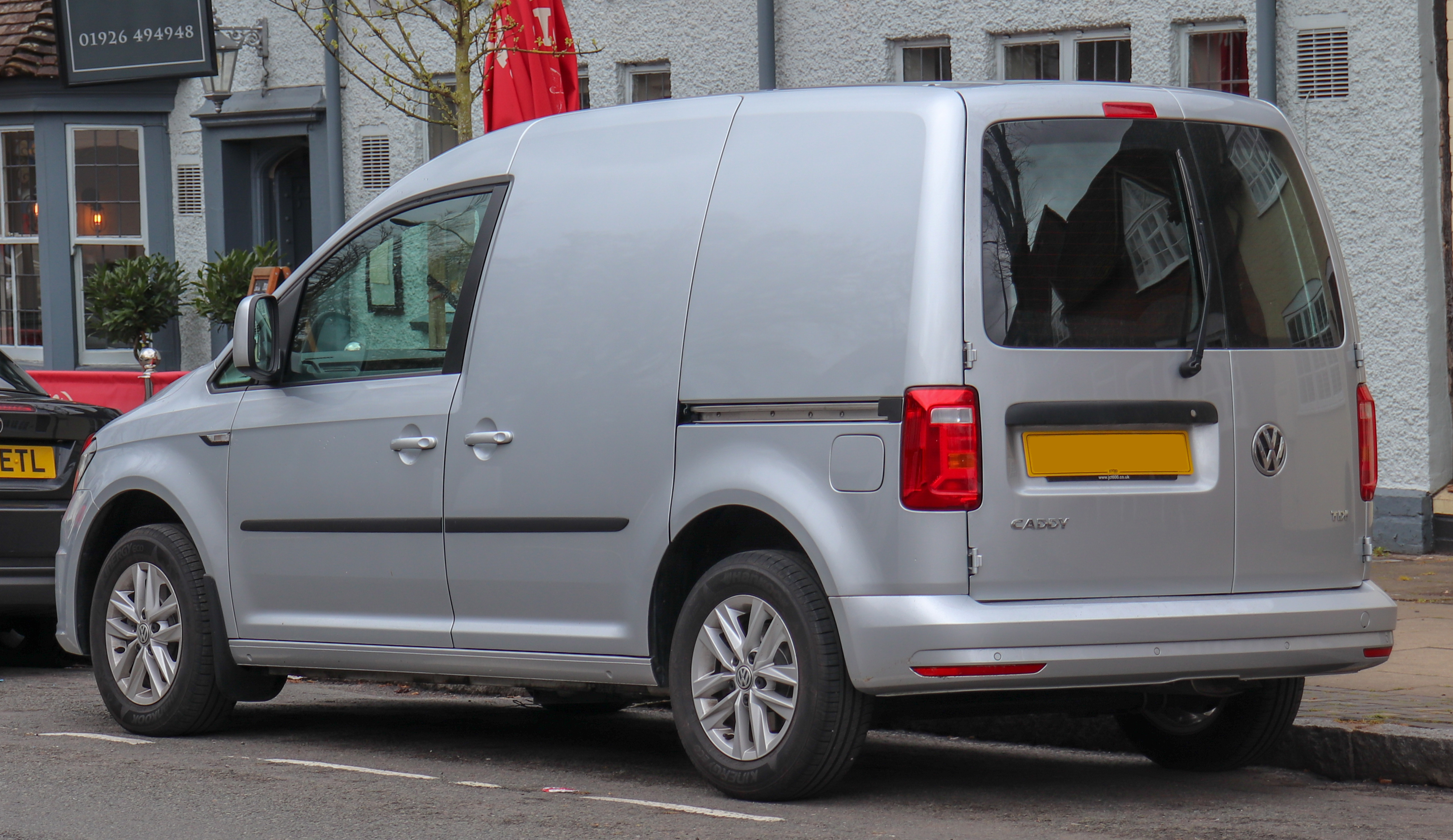
Rear View

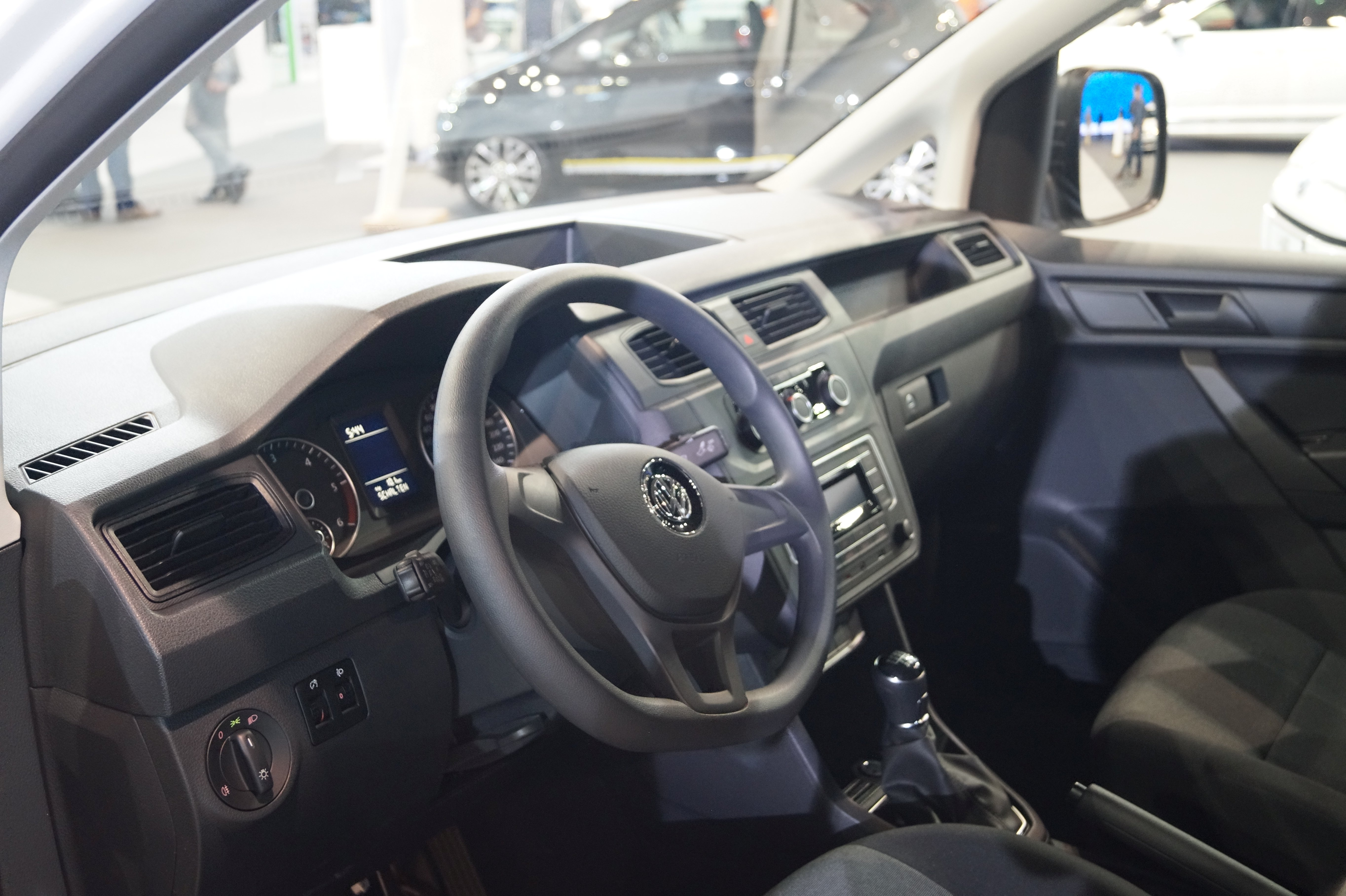
Interior (second facelift)

=== Other versions ===
In 2012, Volkswagen launched the Cross Caddy model with a series of crossover-inspired aesthetic changes. In 2015, the Caddy Alltrack, the successor to the CrossCaddy, debuted at the Frankfurt Motor Show.

Volkswagen Group tuner Abt Sportsline unveiled a battery-electric conversion of the Caddy (Typ 2K) at the IAA 2018 Commercial Vehicle show in Hanover; the ABT e-Caddy is based on the long-wheelbase Caddy Maxi, and is driven by an electric traction motor that develops 82 kW (110 hp) and 200 N⋅m (148 lbf⋅ft) of torque. Driving range is 220 km (137 mi) (NEDC), drawing from a lithium-ion battery with 37.3 kW-hr of capacity.

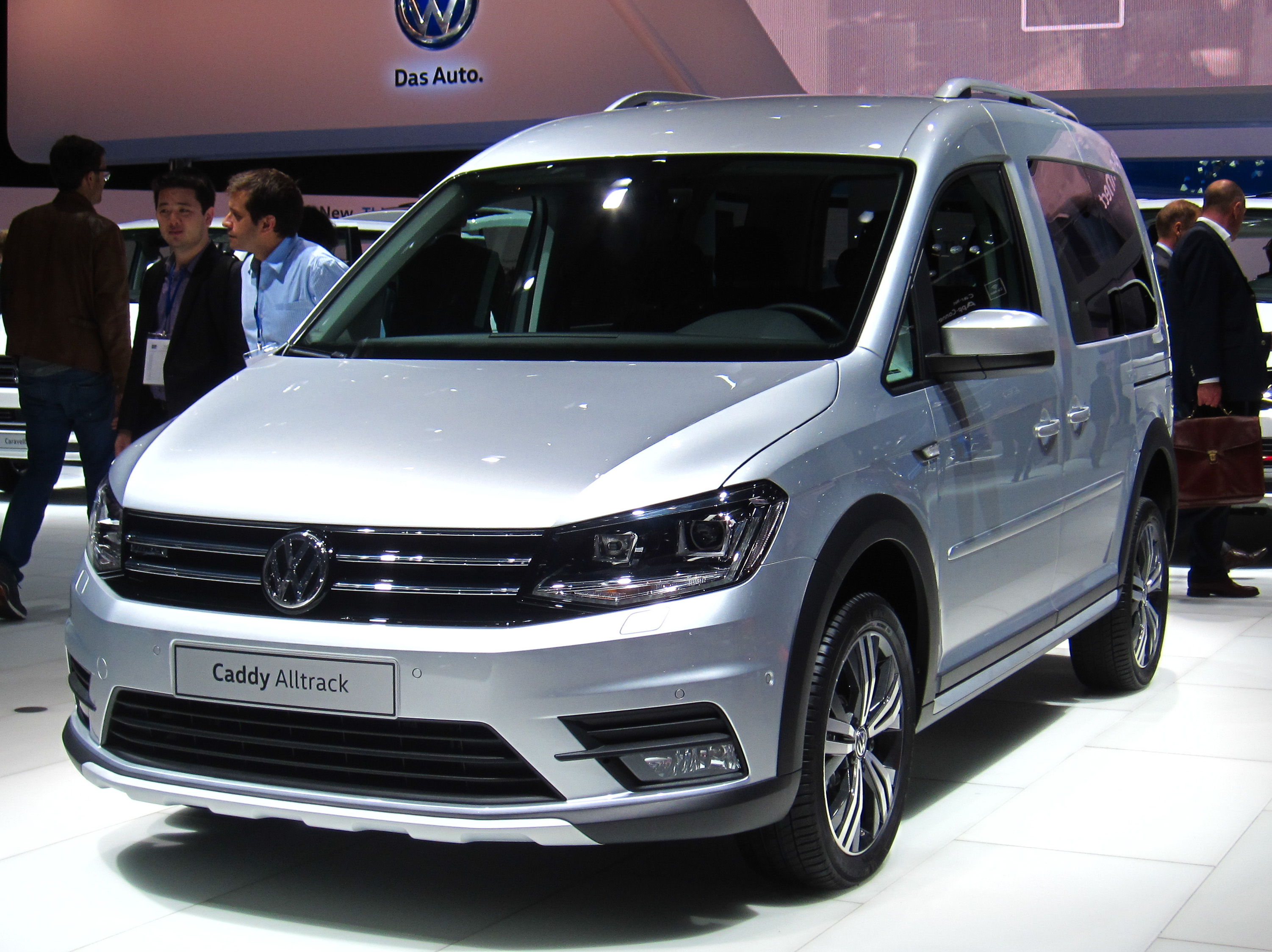
Caddy Alltrack

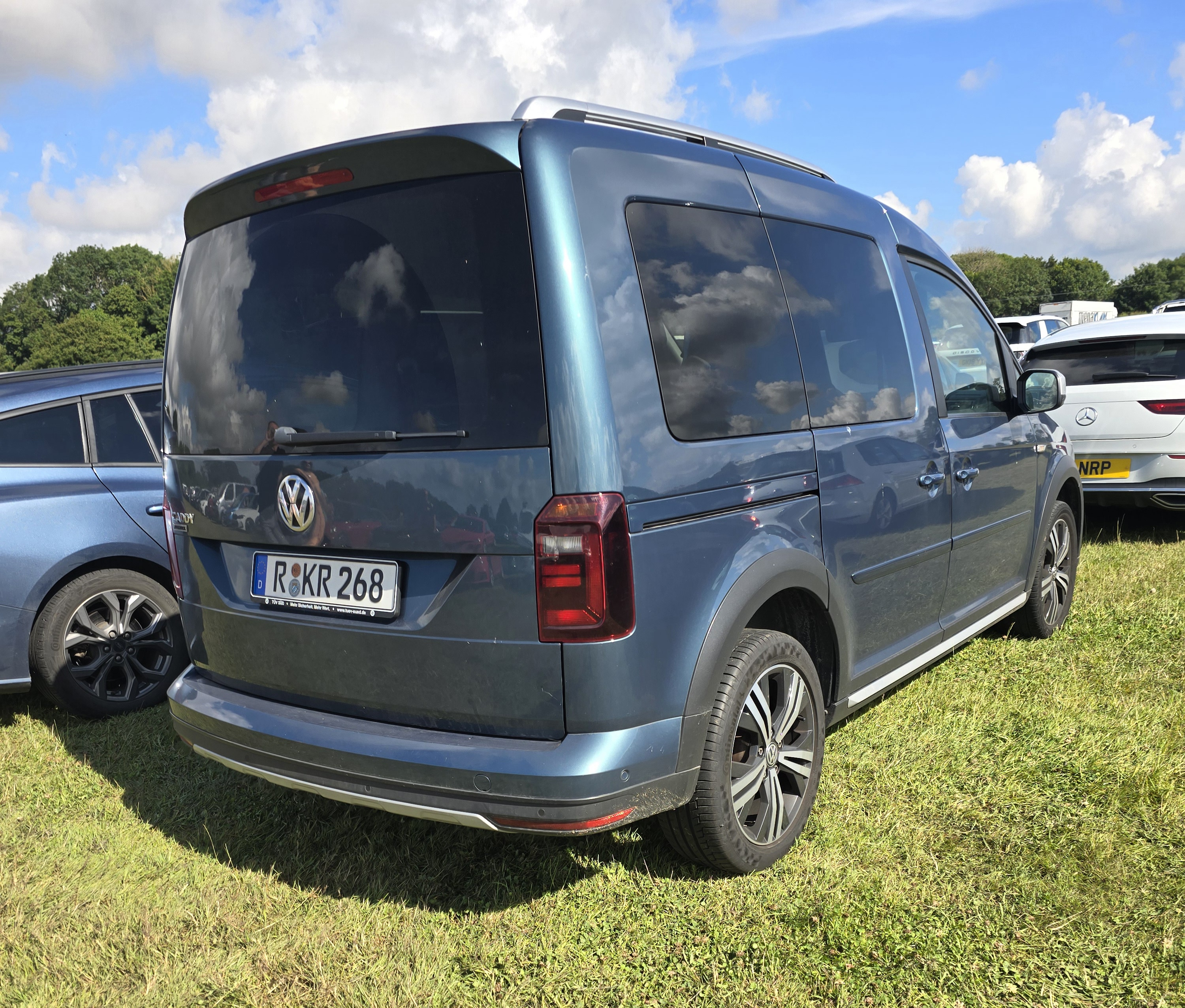
Rear View

=== Safety ===
ANCAP test results* Volkswagen life variants (2007)
Test	Score
Overall	4 /5 stars
Frontal offset	12.46/16
Side impact	15/16
Pole	Not Assessed
Seat belt reminders	1/3
Whiplash protection	Not Assessed
Pedestrian protection	Marginal
Electronic stability control	Optional

ANCAP test results* Volkswagen Caddy short wheelbase van (2008)
Test	Score
Overall	4 /5 stars
Frontal offset	12.46/16
Side impact	15/16
Pole	Not Assessed
Seat belt reminders	1/3
Whiplash protection	Not Assessed
Pedestrian protection	Marginal
Electronic stability control	Optional

Euro NCAP test results* Volkswagen Caddy 2.0 TDI 'Trendline' (LHD) (2015)
Test	Points	%
Overall:	4 /5 stars	
Adult occupant:	32.1	84%
Child occupant:	38.3	78%
Pedestrian:	21	58%
Safety assist:	8.8	68%

== Fourth generation (Typ SB; 2020) ==
Fourth generation
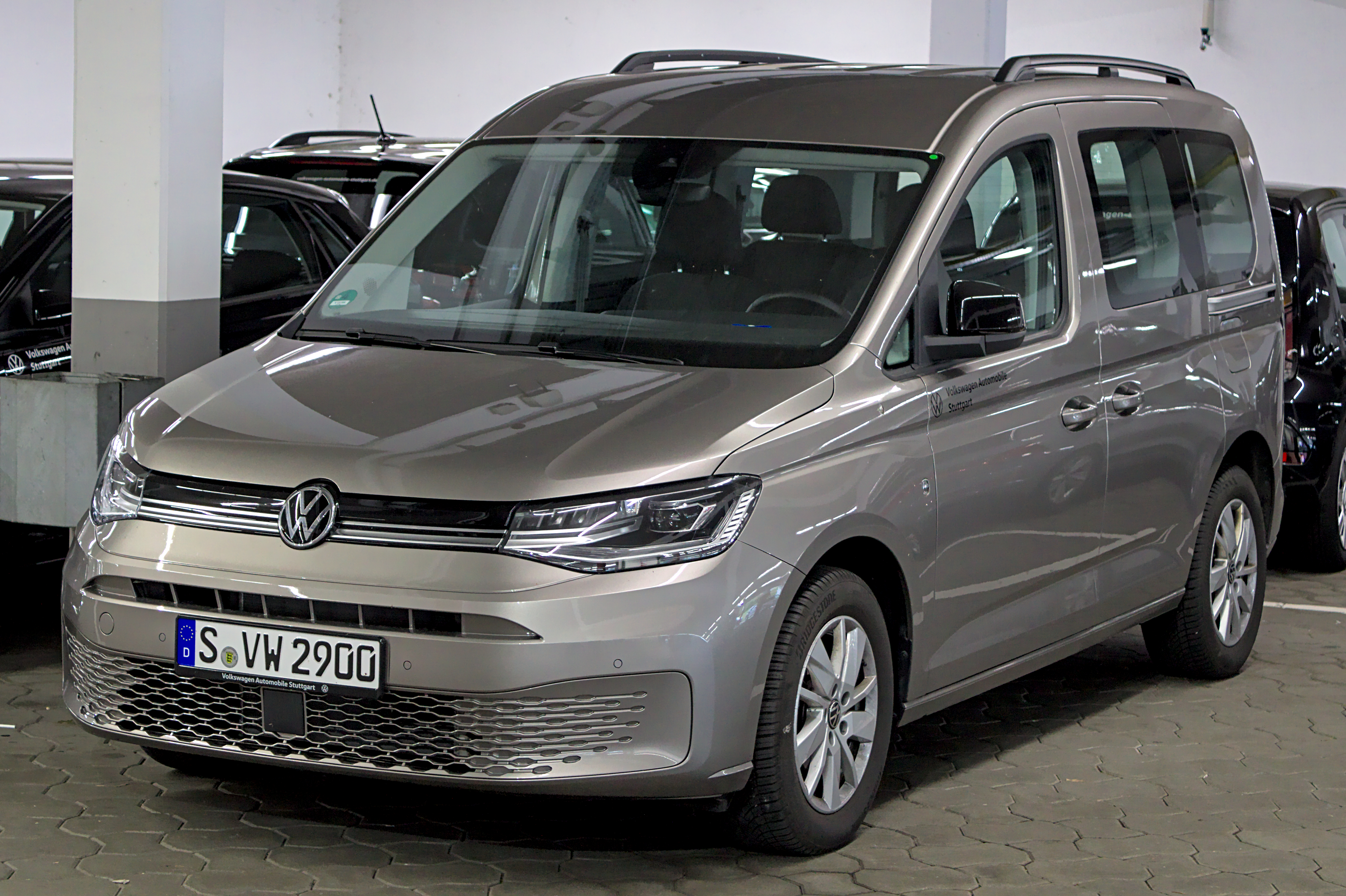

Overview
- Also called: Ford Tourneo Connect
- Production: 2020–present
- Assembly: Poland: Poznań (Volkswagen Poznań Sp. z o.o.)

Body and chassis
- Platform: Volkswagen Group MQB platform

Powertrain
- Engine: Petrol: 1.5 L EA211evo TSI I4 (114 hp); Petrol plug-in hybrid: 1.5 L TSI I4 and electric motor (combined 150 hp); Diesel: 2.0 L EA288evo TDI I4 (102/122 hp)

Dimensions
- Wheelbase: 2,755 mm (108.5 in); 2,975 mm (117.1 in) Maxi
- Length: 4,500 mm (177.2 in); 4,859 mm (191.3 in) Maxi
- Width: 1,855 mm (73.0 in)
- Height: 1,798 mm (70.8 in)
- Curb weight: 1,517–1,998 kg (3,344–4,405 lb)

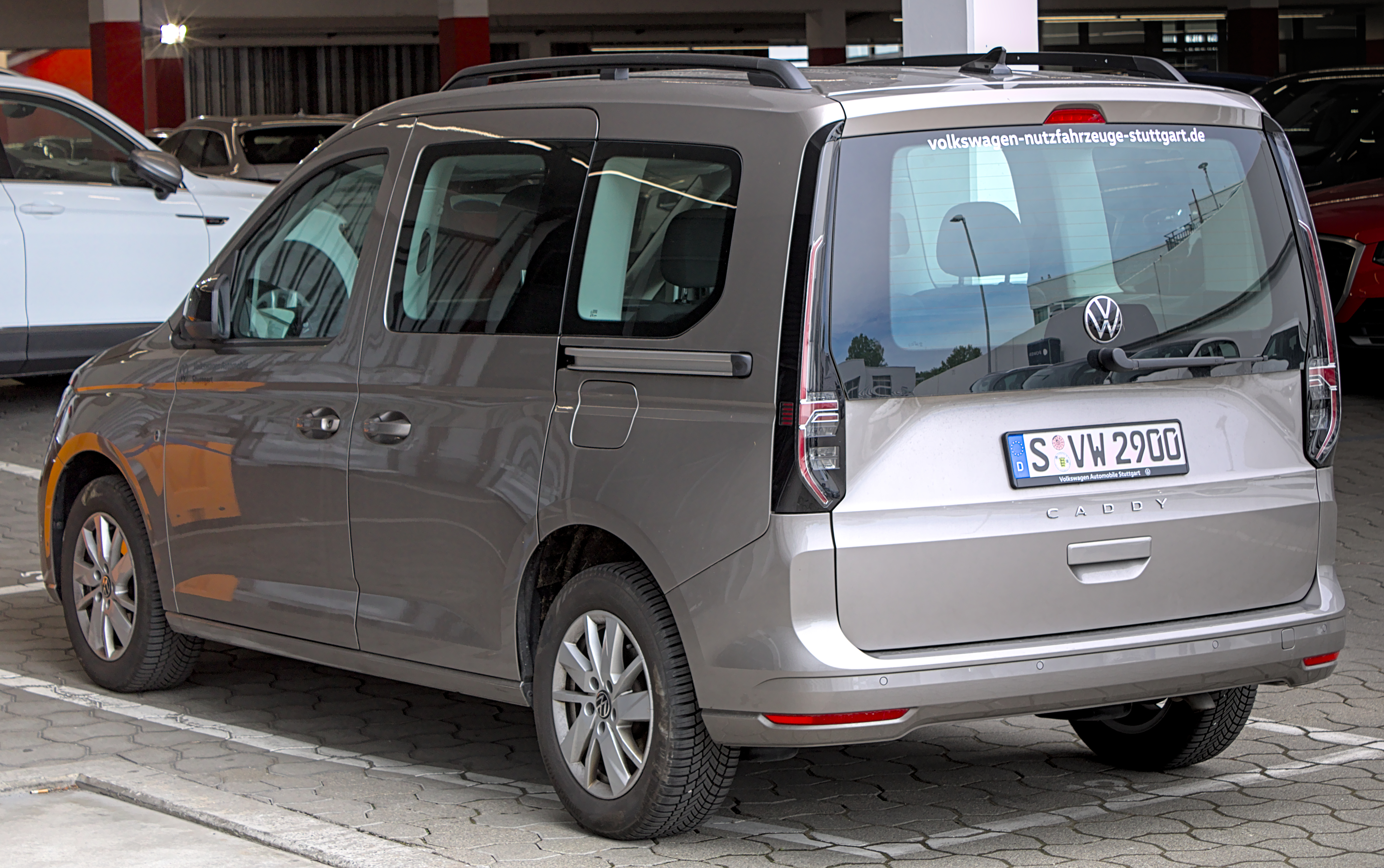
Rear view

The fourth-generation Caddy was unveiled in February 2020. For the first time, it is based on the Volkswagen MQB platform. The switch to MQB has enabled VW to offer new tech to the Caddy lineup, including Travel Assist, the new oncoming vehicle braking when turning function, connected infotainment systems and digitalized controls. VW is offering the estate and MPV in Kombi, Caddy, Life, Move, and Style trim levels, while the delivery van will be offered in multiple trim levels; for each variant, "Maxi" is appended to the name to designate the long-wheelbase variant. It went on sale in November 2020.

The design team responsible for the Typ SB was led by Albert Kirzinger. Overall length and width have increased by 92 and 62 mm (3.6 and 2.4 in), respectively, while height has decreased by 5 mm (0.20 in) compared to the Typ 2K.

=== Models ===
The Caddy is available in a light commercial vehicle (LCV) variant with two seats (Caddy Cargo) or a multi-purpose vehicle (MPV) with five or seven seats (Caddy/Caddy Life). There is also a five-seat model prepared for camping, with a slide-out kitchenette in lieu of the third seating row of the MPV (Caddy California). All versions are available with regular or extended wheelbase (Maxi).

The Caddy Cargo Typ SB became able to accommodate a EUR-pallet; the opening at the rear hatch was widened to 1,234 mm (48.6 in) and the interior width between the wheel arches was increased to 1,230 mm (48 in). With sliding side doors that are 846 mm (33.3 in), 145 mm (5.7 in) wider than the standard Caddy Cargo, the Caddy Cargo Maxi is able to accommodate a second EUR-pallet loaded cross-wise in the cargo area. Maximum cargo width is 1,613 mm (63.5 in) for both variants, interior height is 1,272–1,274 mm (50.1–50.2 in), and the loading lengths are 1,797 and 2,150 mm (70.7 and 84.6 in), for the standard and Maxi, respectively, making the cargo volumes 3.1 and 3.7 m^{3} (110 and 130 cu ft).

In July 2022, the Volkswagen Caddy received a CNG-powered TGI variant and the Dark Label special edition.

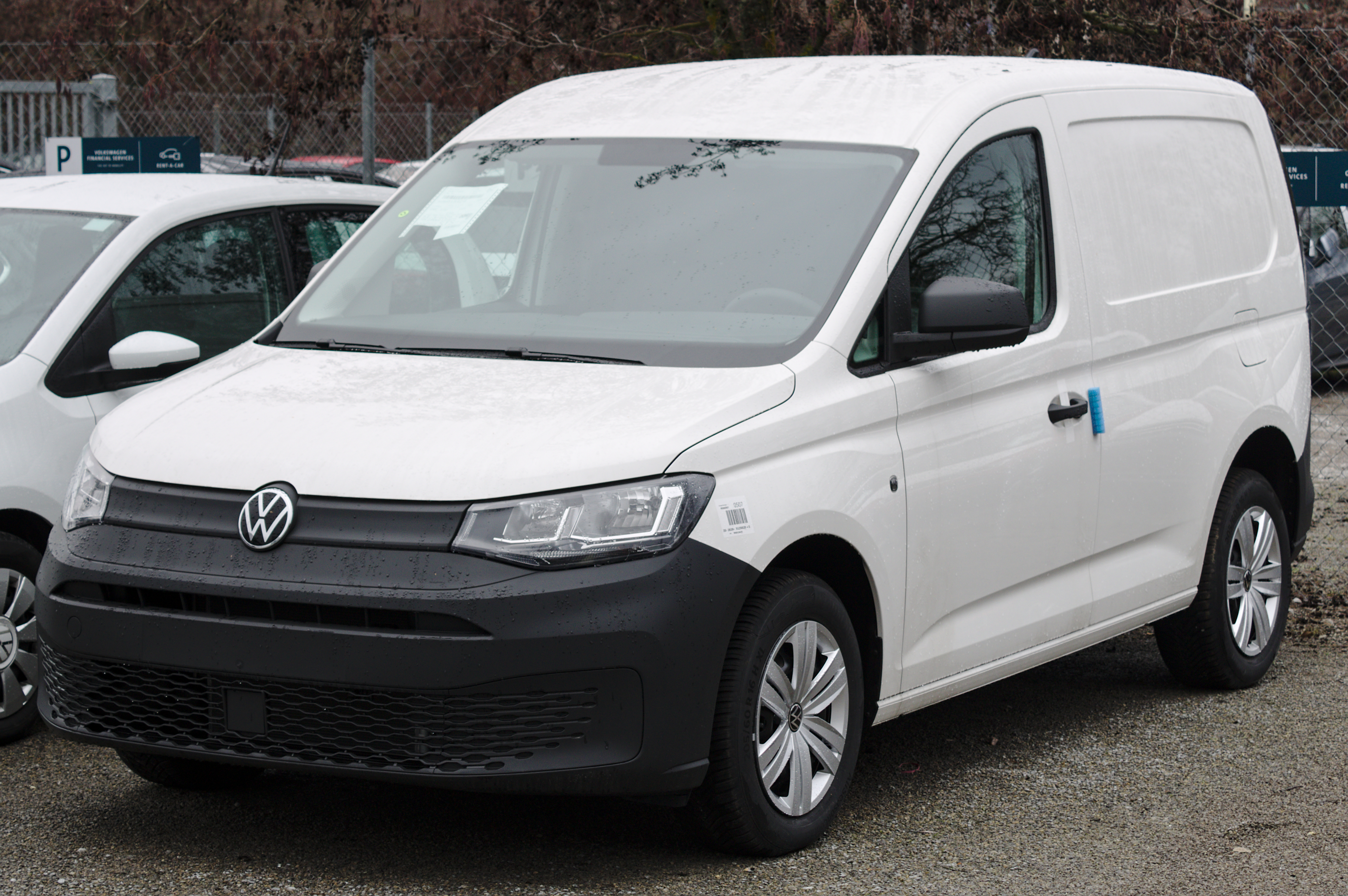
Caddy Cargo

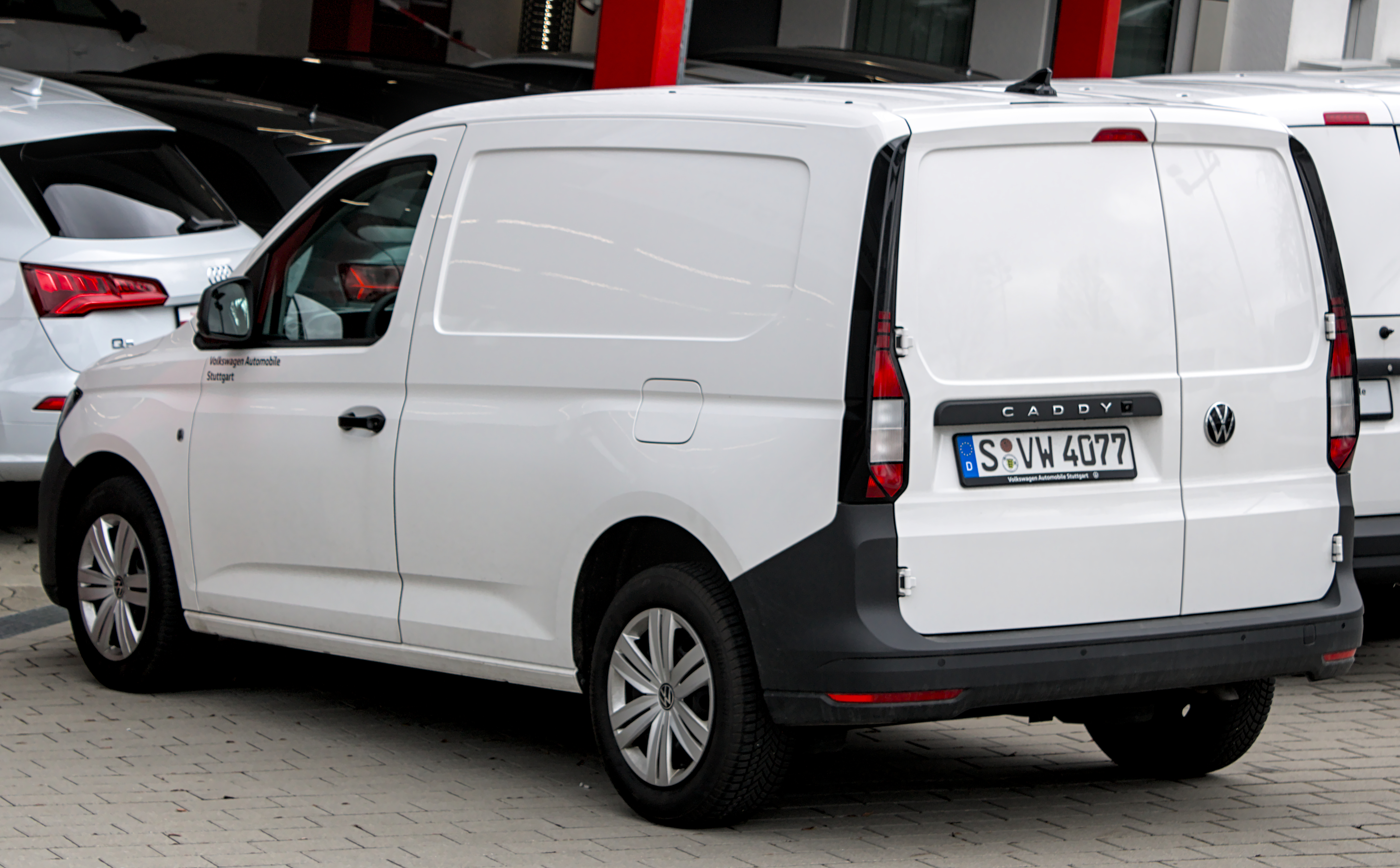
Rear View

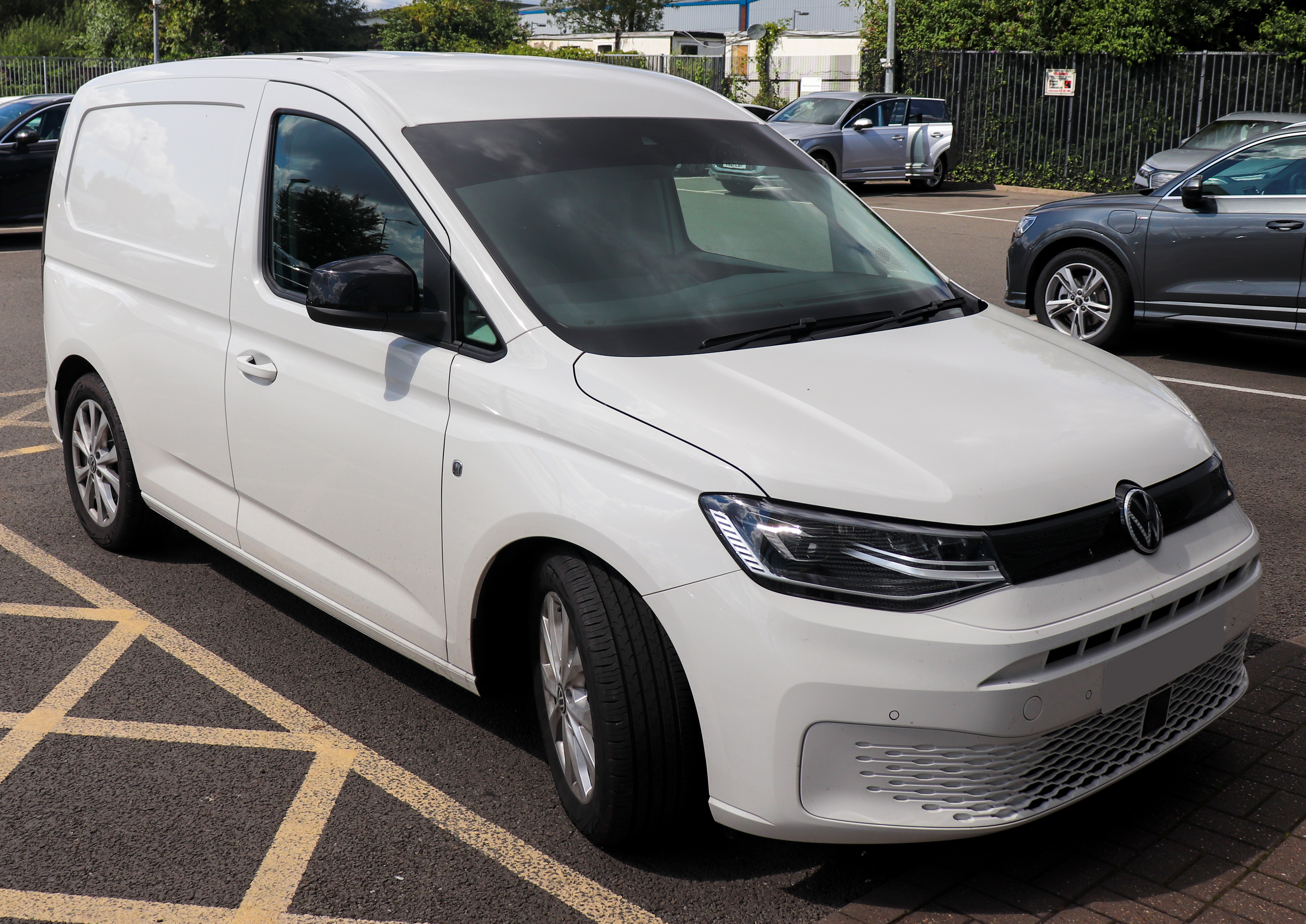
Caddy Commerce Pro

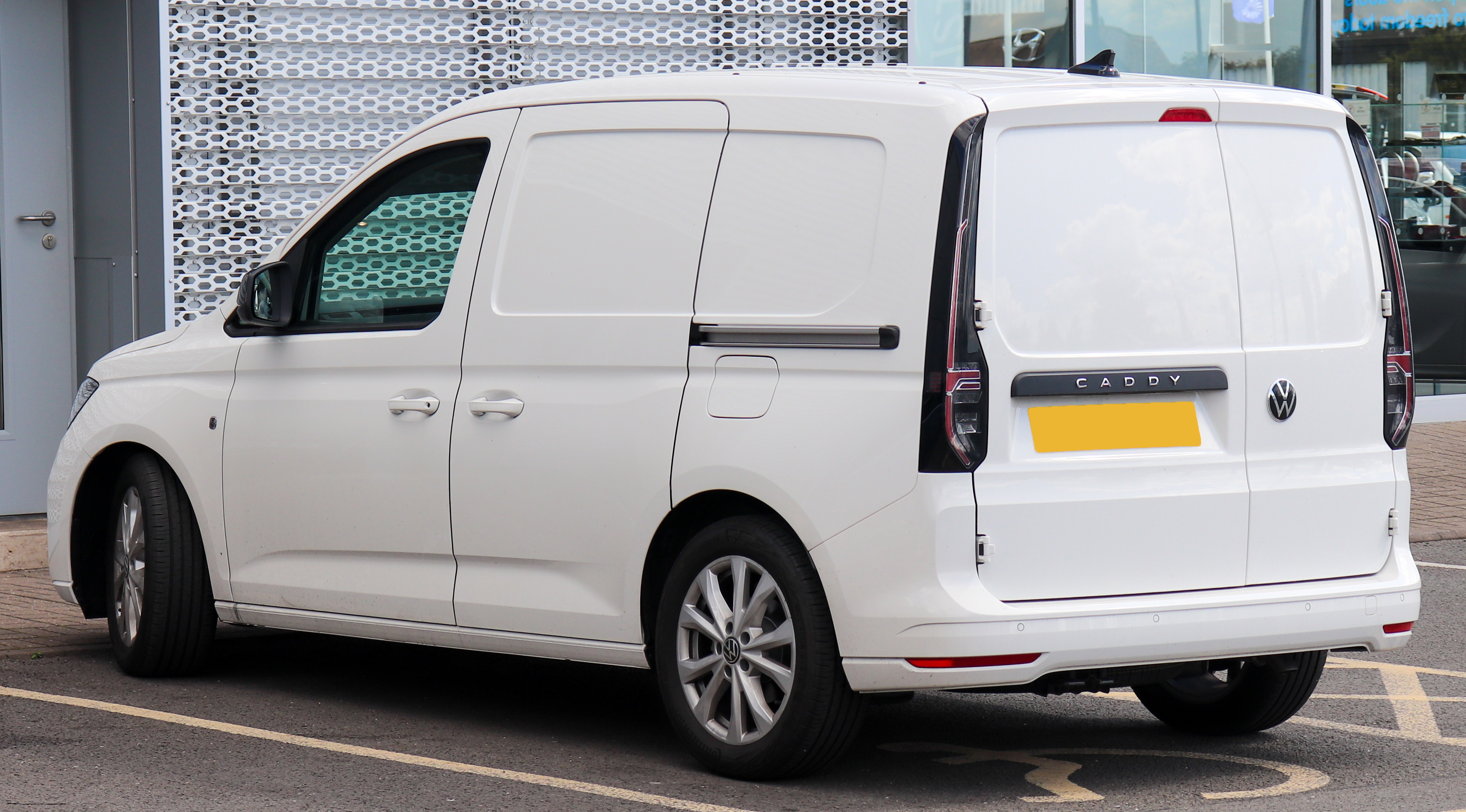
Rear View

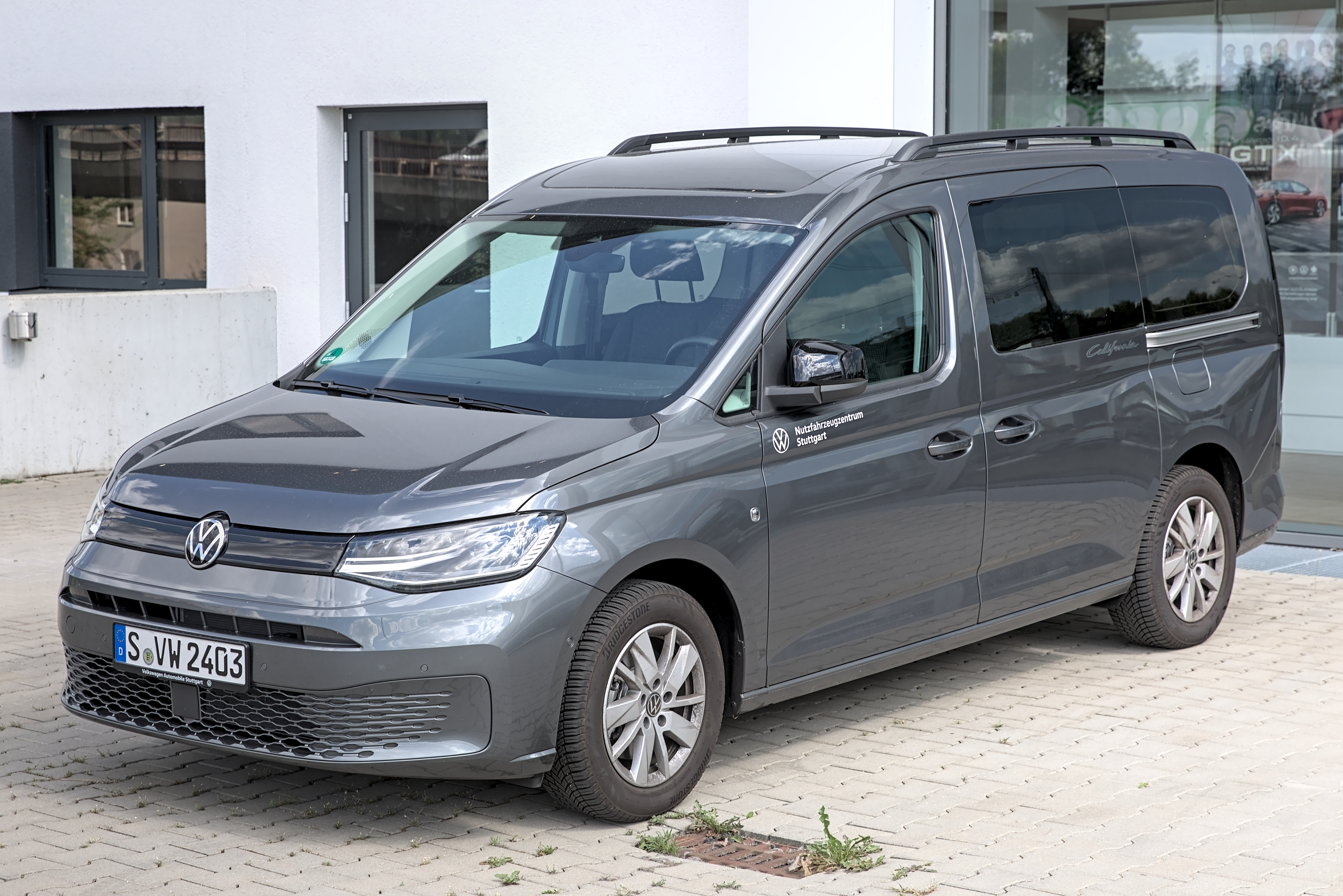
Caddy Maxi California

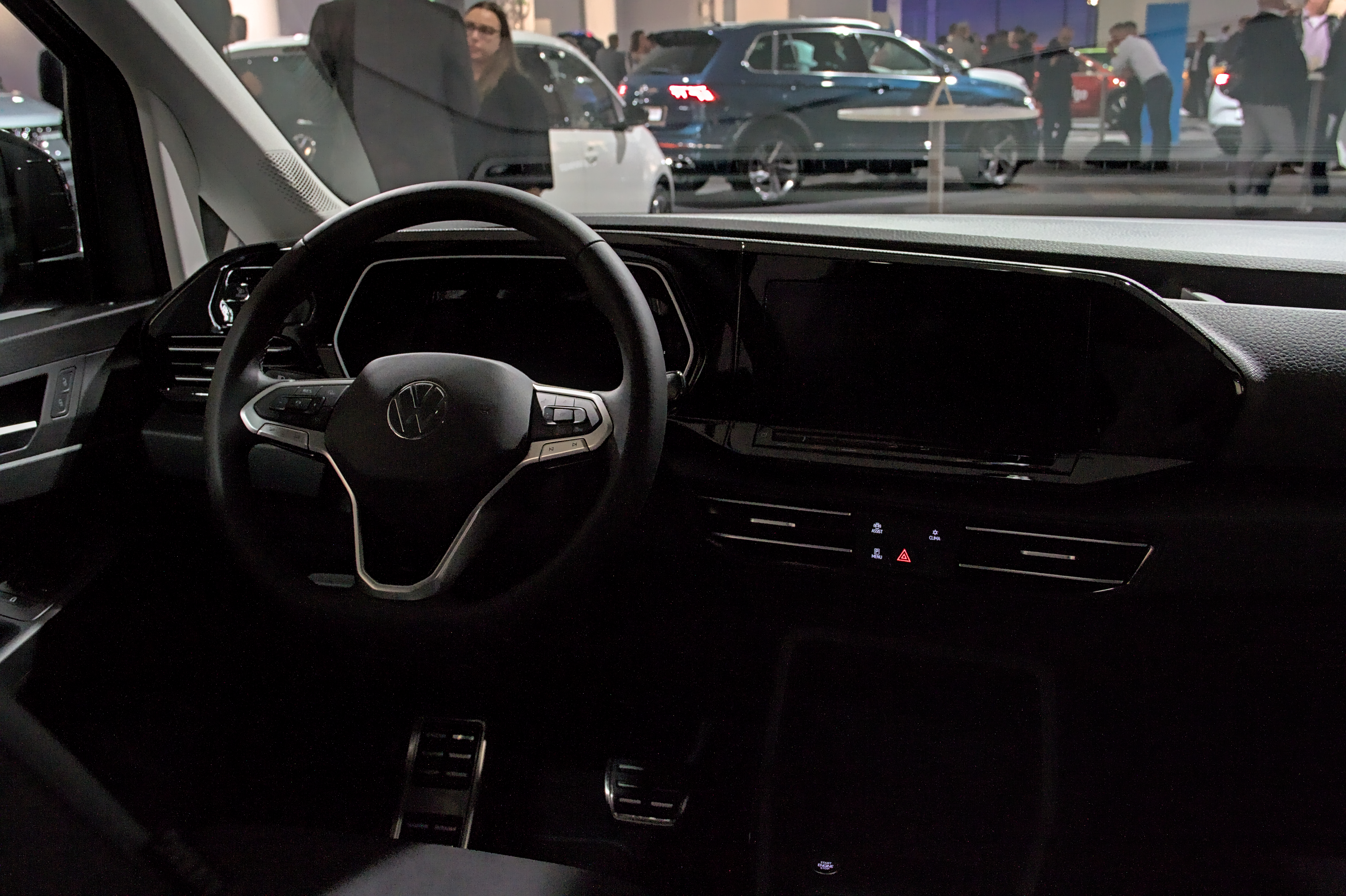
Interior

==== Ford Tourneo Connect ====
In 2021, the Ford Tourneo Connect was announced as a rebadged Caddy, the first model developed under the Ford-Volkswagen partnership. Prior Ford MPVs in this size class have been based on the Ford Transit Connect. The Tourneo Connect shares the Volkswagen Caddy's engine lineup, with the EA288-evo rebranded to EcoBlue and the EA211-evo rebranded to EcoBoost. The first deliveries started in early 2022.

The Active trim level features a crossover-inspired look with plastic cladding, aluminum-style skid plates and unique 17-inch wheels.

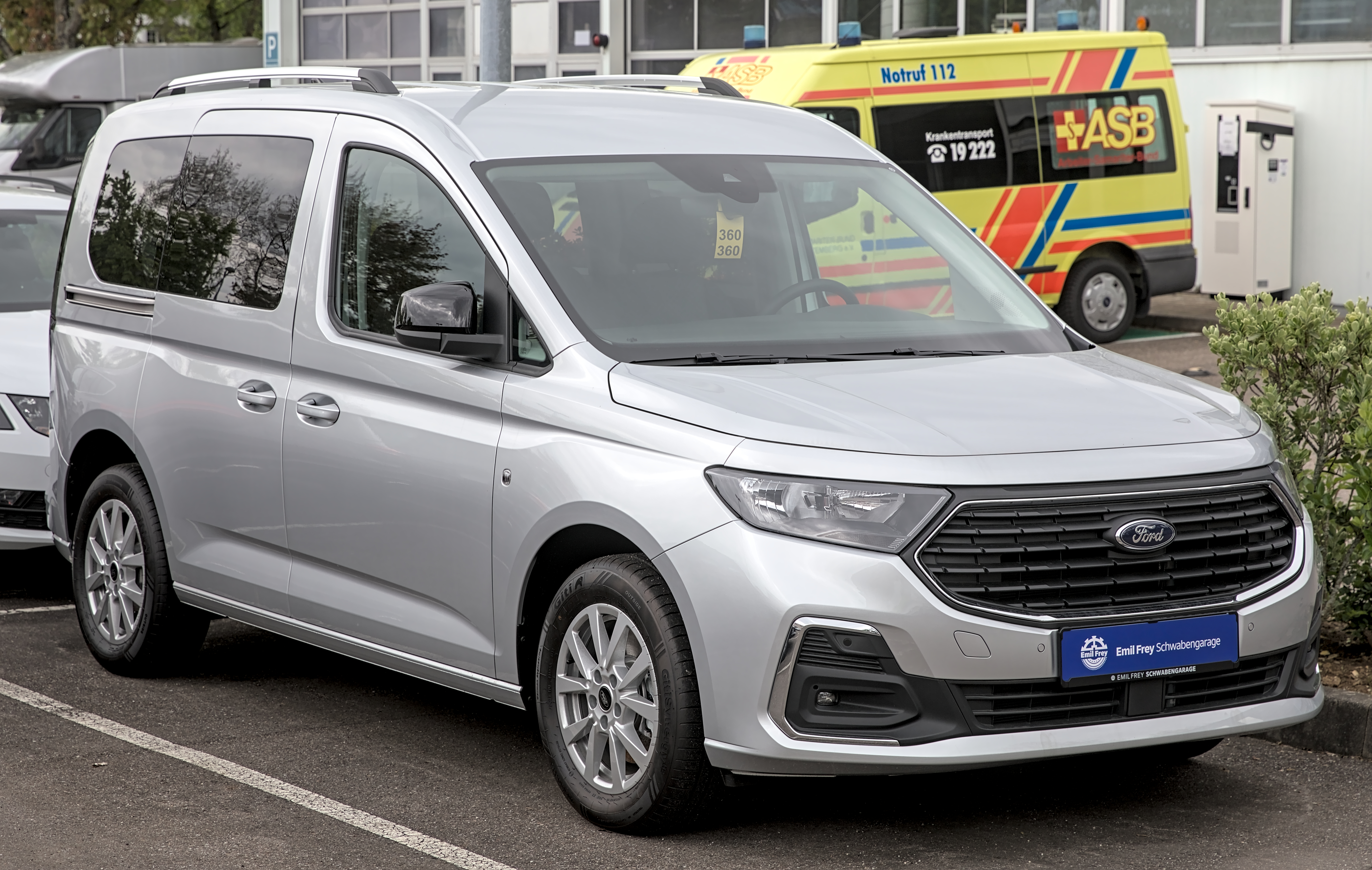
Tourneo Connect

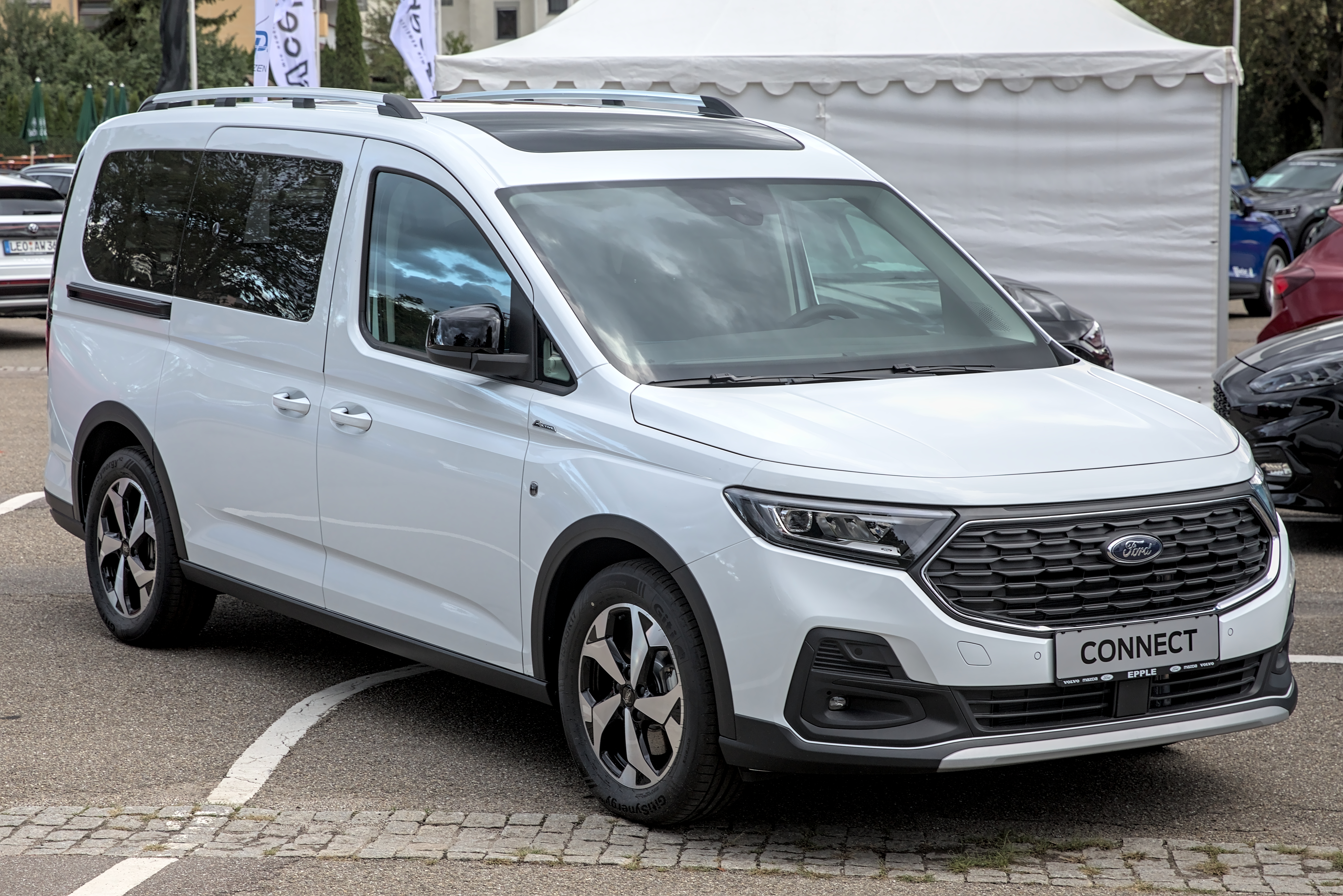
Tourneo Connect Active

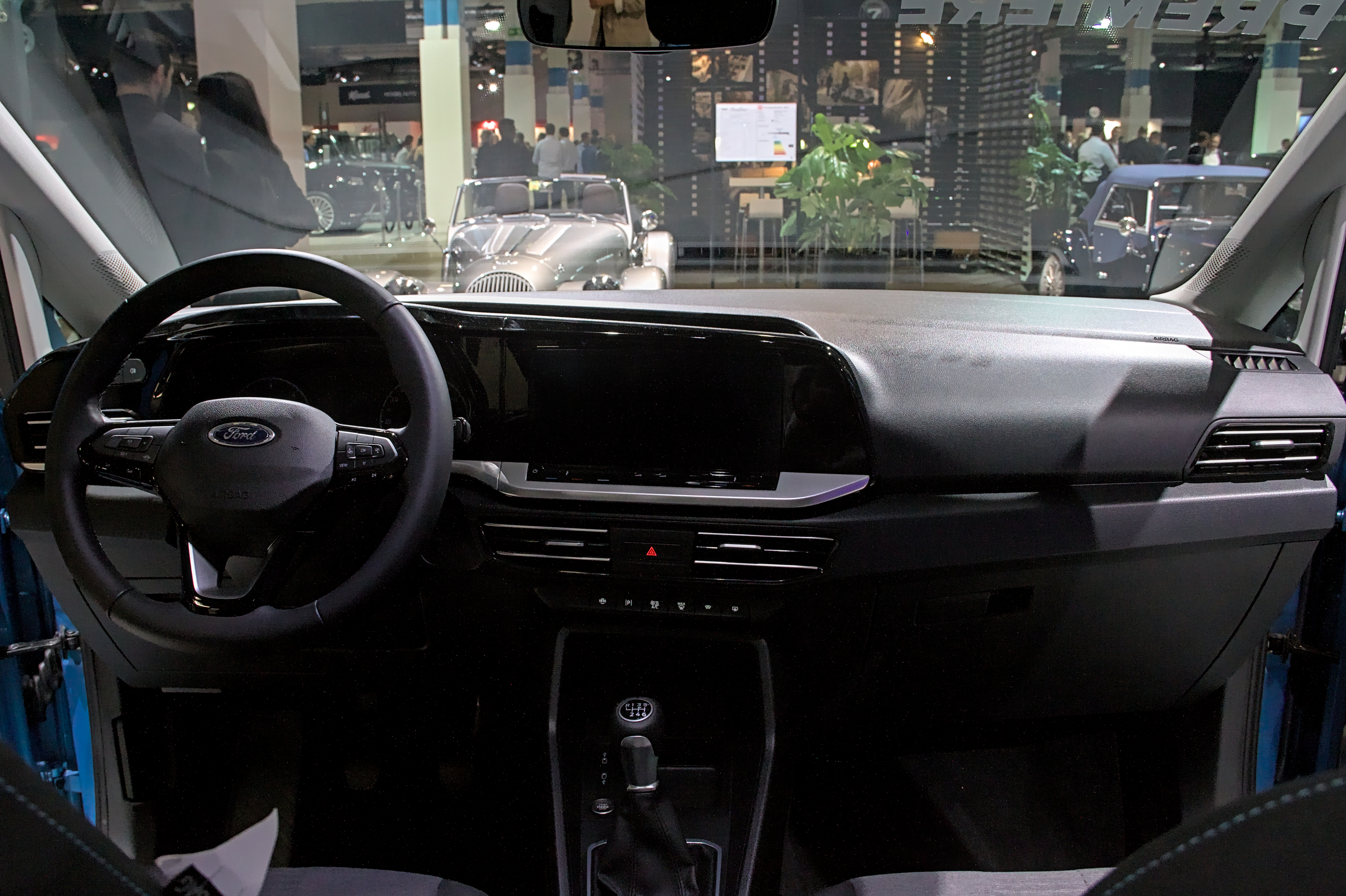
Interior

=== Engines ===
Caddy Typ SB engines
Model	Years	Type	Code	Output (@RPM)		Consumption	CO_{2} emissions
Model	Years	Type	Code	Power	Torque	Consumption	CO_{2} emissions
Diesel engines
2.0TDI 75PS	2020+	1,968 cc (120.1 cu in) I4, turbocharged	EA288 evo	75 PS (55 kW; 74 hp) (@2250–4500)	250 N⋅m (184 lbf⋅ft) (@1375-2000)	5.1–4.9 L/100 km (46–48 mpg_{‑US})	127–133 g/km (7.2–7.6 oz/mi)
2.0TDI 102PS	2020+	1,968 cc (120.1 cu in) I4, turbocharged	EA288 evo	102 PS (75 kW; 101 hp) (@2750–4250)	280 N⋅m (207 lbf⋅ft) (@1500-2500)	5.2–4.8 L/100 km (45–49 mpg_{‑US})	127–137 g/km (7.2–7.8 oz/mi)
2.0TDI 122PS	2020+	1,968 cc (120.1 cu in) I4, turbocharged	EA288 evo	122 PS (90 kW; 120 hp) (@2750–4250)	320 N⋅m (236 lbf⋅ft) (@1500-2500)	5.5–5.1 L/100 km (43–46 mpg_{‑US})	134–145 g/km (7.6–8.2 oz/mi)
Petrol engines
1.5TSI 114PS	2020+	1,498 cc (91.4 cu in) I4, turbocharged	EA211 evo	114 PS (84 kW; 112 hp) (@4500–6000)	220 N⋅m (162 lbf⋅ft) (@1750-3000)	6.8–6.4 L/100 km (35–37 mpg_{‑US})	145–155 g/km (8.2–8.8 oz/mi)

=== Safety ===
==== ANCAP ====
ANCAP test results* Volkswagen Caddy Australian Trendline short wheelbase (SWB) variants (2015, aligned with Euro NCAP)
Test	Points	%
Overall:	4 /5 stars	
Adult occupant:	32.1	84%
Child occupant:	38.1	78%
Pedestrian:	20.9	58%
Safety assist:	8.8	68%

ANCAP test results Volkswagen Caddy all MPV people mover variants (2021, aligned with Euro NCAP)
Test	Points	%
Overall:	5 /5 stars	
Adult occupant:	32.28	84%
Child occupant:	42.32	86%
Pedestrian:	37.61	69%
Safety assist:	12.75	79%

ANCAP test results Volkswagen Caddy Cargo all Cargo variants inc. Crewvan (2021, aligned with Euro NCAP)
Test	Points	%
Overall:	5 /5 stars	
Adult occupant:	32.28	84%
Child occupant:	42.94	87%
Pedestrian:	37.61	69%
Safety assist:	12.25	76%

==== Euro NCAP ====
Euro NCAP test results Volkswagen Caddy 2.0 diesel Kombi 'Life' 4x2 (LHD) (2021)
Test	Points	%
Overall:	5 /5 stars	
Adult occupant:	32.3	84%
Child occupant:	40.6	82%
Pedestrian:	37.6	69%
Safety assist:	12.7	79%

Euro NCAP test results Volkswagen Caddy 2.0 diesel 75kW (LHD) (2025)
Test	Points	%
Overall:	4 /5 stars	
Adult occupant:	29.0	72%
Child occupant:	39.3	80%
Pedestrian:	50.5	80%
Safety assist:	12.8	71%

Euro NCAP test results Volkswagen Cargo Commerce TDI, LHD (2025)
Test	Score
Overall:	5 /5 stars
Safe driving	72%
Crash avoidance	76%
Post crash	80%

Euro NCAP test results Ford Transit Connect (2025)
Test	Score
Overall:	5 /5 stars
Safe driving	72%
Crash avoidance	76%
Post crash	80%
