= SEAT Inca =

Overview
- Manufacturer: SEAT
- Also called: Volkswagen Caddy
- Production: 1996–2004
- Assembly: Spain: Martorell, Catalonia; Argentina: Pacheco; Poland: Poznań

Body and chassis
- Class: Van/panel van
- Body style: 3-door van/panel van
- Layout: Front-engine, front-wheel-drive
- Platform: Volkswagen Group A03
- Related: SEAT Ibiza Mk2; SEAT Córdoba Mk1; Volkswagen Polo Mk3; Volkswagen Polo Playa; Volkswagen Polo Classic

Powertrain
- Engine: 1.4 L I4; 1.6 L I4; 1.9 L I4 D 1.9 L I4 SDI; 1.9 L I4 TDI

Dimensions
- Length: 4,207 mm (165.6 in)
- Width: 1,695 mm (66.7 in)
- Height: 1,846 mm (72.7 in)

Chronology
- Predecessor: SEAT Terra
- Successor: Škoda Roomster (indirect)

The SEAT Inca (Typ 9K) was a van and panel van produced by the Spanish manufacturer SEAT between 1996 and 2004. It was designed and assembled in Spain, based on the SEAT Ibiza Mark 2. It was first shown at the Barcelona Motor Show of 1995.

== Design ==
The SEAT Inca had two rear wing doors which, because they were non symmetrical, were supposed to facilitate loading and unloading. Capable of carrying a payload of 550 kg (1,213 lb) and towing a 1,000 kg (2,205 lb) braked trailer the Inca proved to be a strong work horse in many markets. The Inca was awarded the Comercial do Ano ("Commercial vehicle of the Year") award in Portugal in 1997.

SEAT Inca panel van, rear view

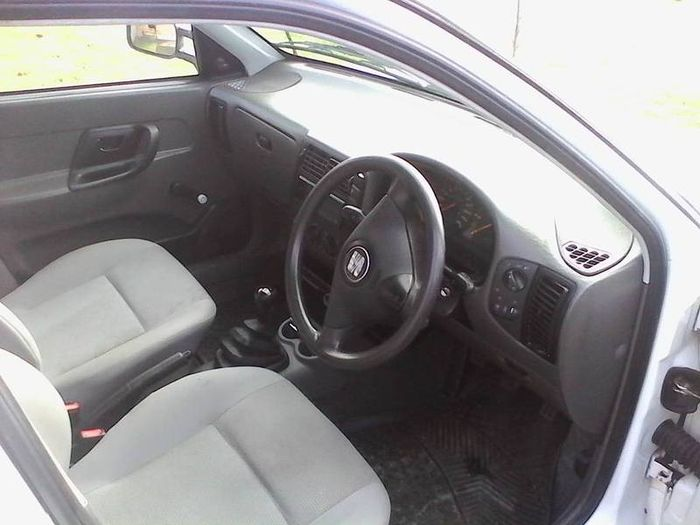
Interior

== Performance ==
The Inca came with 1.4 60 PS (44 kW) and 1.6 75 PS (55 kW) petrol engines, and was also available with the tried and tested 64 PS (47 kW) 1.9-litre (1,896 cc) indirect injection diesel engine from the Volkswagen Golf and Volkswagen Polo, or a 90 PS (66 kW) Turbocharged Direct Injection (TDI) diesel in certain countries.

A 64 PS (47 kW) 1.9-liter Suction Diesel Injection (SDI) direct injection diesel with electronic control and improved economy over the indirect injection engine was also available from 1999 onwards.

Petrol Engine	Top Speed	Acceleration 0–100 km/h (0-62 mph), s
1.4, 44 kW (60 PS; 59 bhp)	142 km/h (88 mph)	18.8
1.6, 55 kW (75 PS; 74 bhp)	155 km/h (96 mph)	15.2

Diesel Engine	Top Speed	Acceleration 0–100 km/h (0-62 mph), s
1.9 indirect injection D, 47 kW (64 PS; 63 bhp)	144 km/h (89 mph)	20.6
1.9 direct injection SDi, 47 kW (64 PS; 63 bhp)	144 km/h (89 mph)	20.1
1.9 turbocharged Direct Injection TDI, 66 kW (90 PS; 89 bhp)	165 km/h (103 mph)	14.0

== Sales ==
From its launch in 1997 until end of production in 2004, more than 115,000 SEAT Inca cars were produced and sold. The annual production of SEAT Inca delivery/panel van (without side windows) and Kombi (with side windows and removable seats that could be used for cargo or passengers) manufactured at SEAT Martorell are shown below. SEAT facilities only; corrected 7/11/2018 from cited Volkswagen and SEAT annual reports of 1997:

Model	1997	1998	1999	2000	2001	2002	2003	2004
SEAT Inca		16,905	18,103	15,207	14,763	11,802	7,982	4,206
SEAT Inca Kombi		7,708	8,573	5,534	5,316	3,879	2,150	743
Total annual production	25,484	24,613	26,676	20,741	20,079	15,681	10,132	4,949

== Rebadges ==
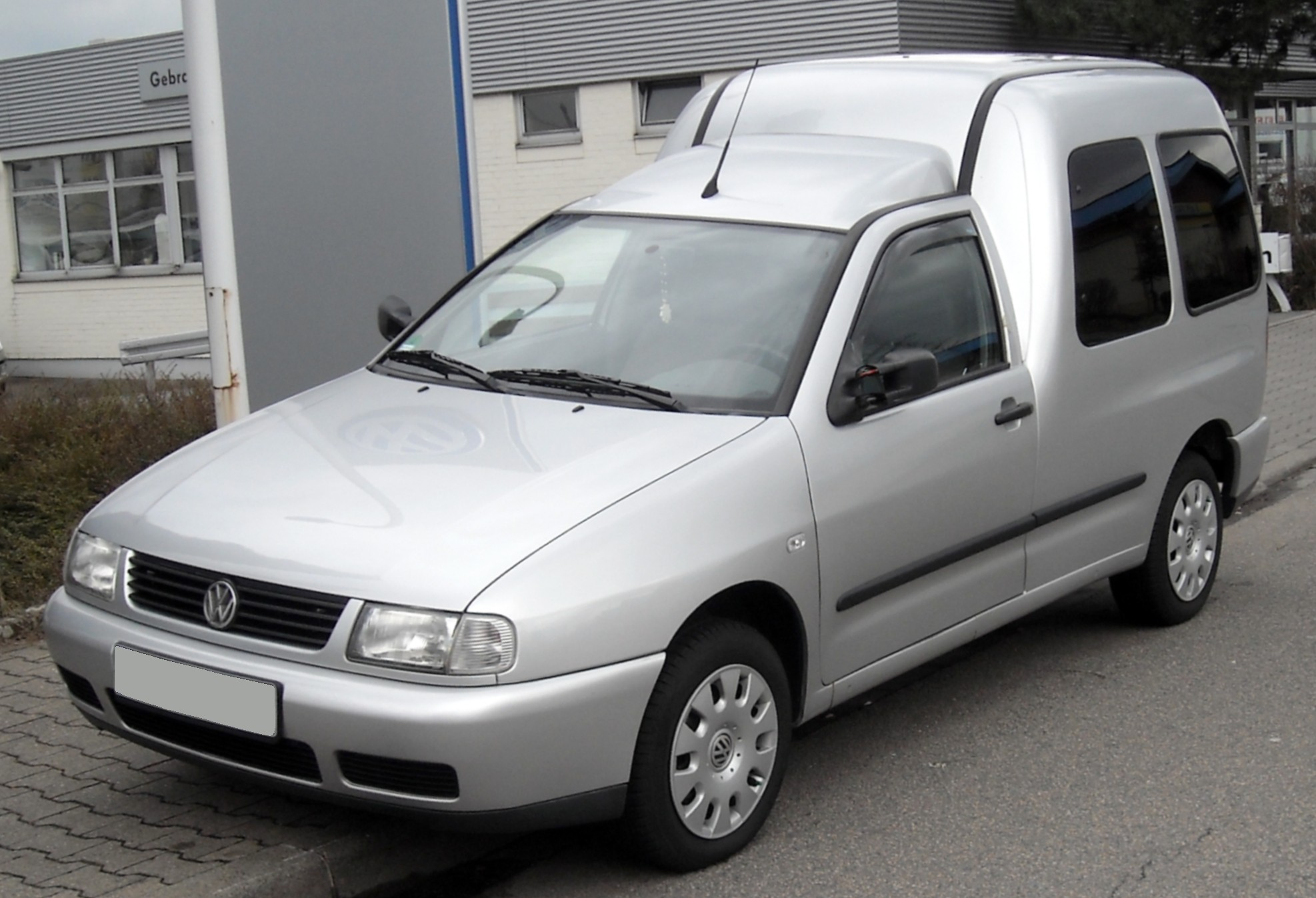
Volkswagen Caddy (Typ 9K)

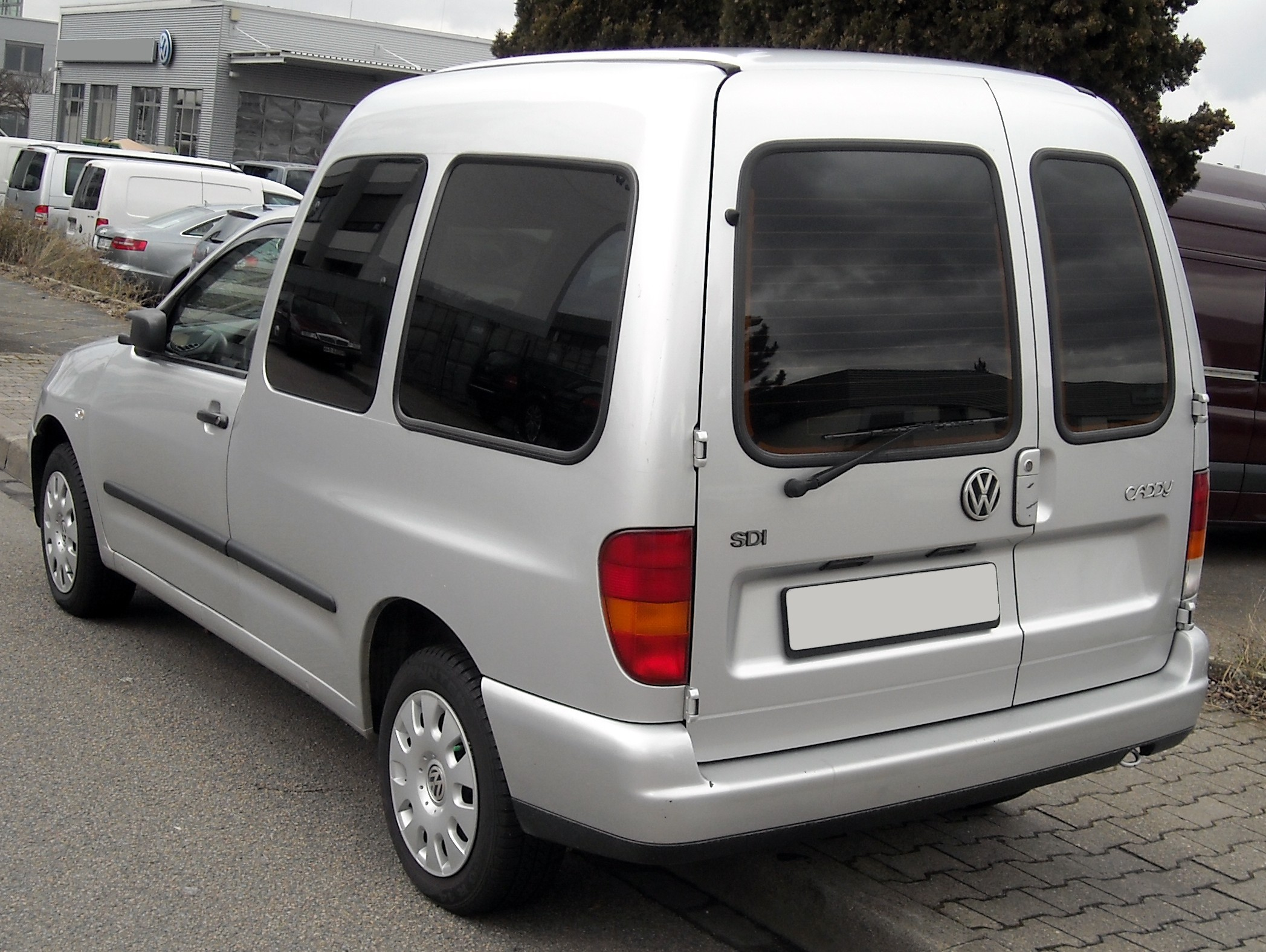
Volkswagen Caddy (Typ 9K) Rear

The SEAT Inca was rebadged by SEAT's parent company Volkswagen and sold under the name Volkswagen Caddy (Typ 9K). Its badge-engineered Volkswagen stablemate was identical in every respect apart from some (easily interchangeable) branding logos, and the front grille.

In the beginning of the 2000s, the Volkswagen Group had decided to shift the marketing focus of the SEAT brand to target the younger driver with an emphasis on more sporty models. Despite this move, the Caddy and the Inca continued to be produced at the same manufacturing facilities, until the Inca was discontinued in June 2004.

The Inca name was then dropped from the line up of SEAT, but the Caddy was replaced with a new variant based on the platform of the Volkswagen Golf V.
