= Volkswagen Group A0 platform =

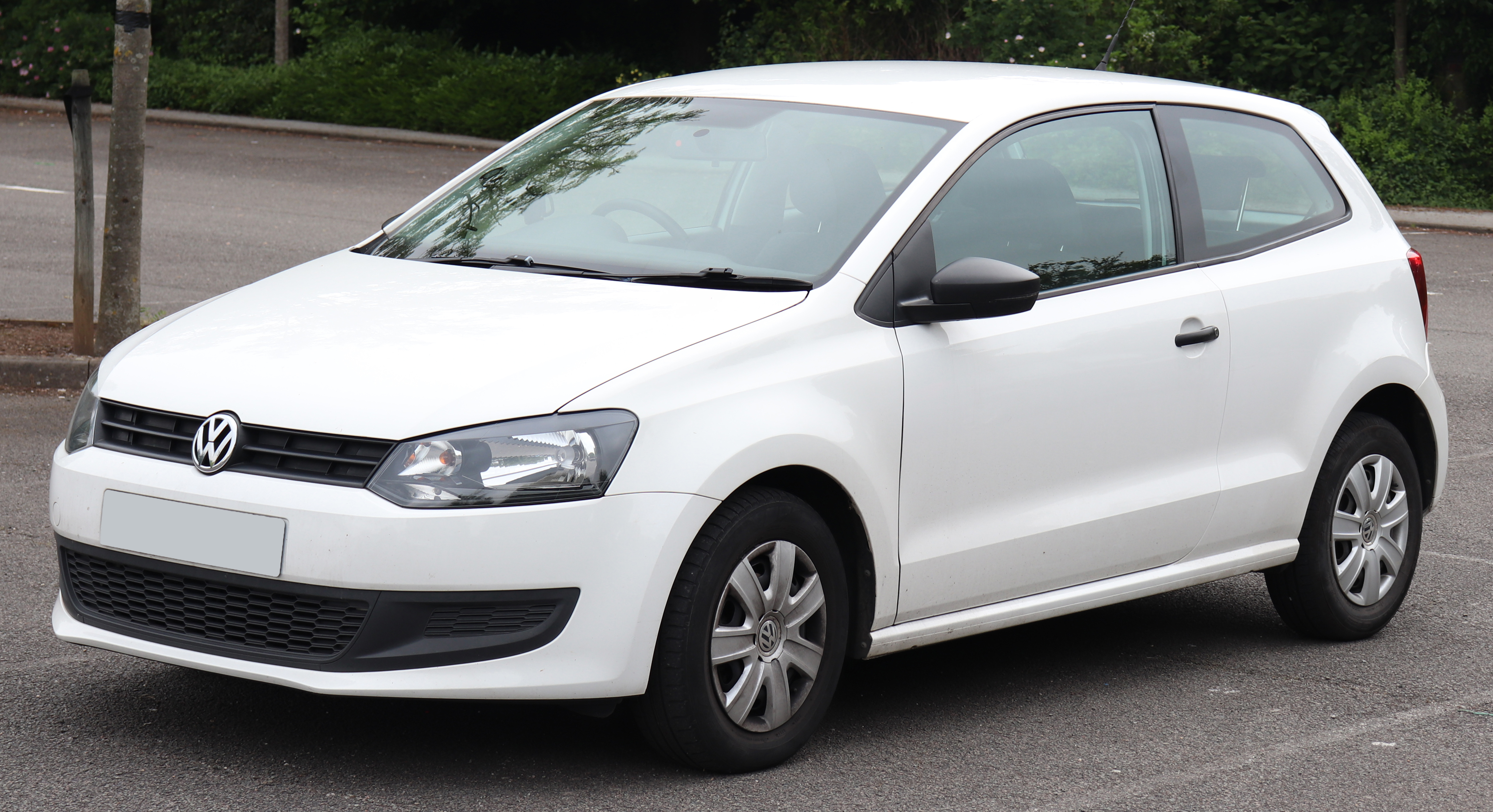

Overview
- Manufacturer: Volkswagen Group
- Production: 1974–present

Body and chassis
- Layout: Transverse Front-engine, front-wheel-drive; Transverse Front-engine, all-wheel-drive

Chronology
- Successor: MQB A0 (for PQ25 and PQ26 Platform)

The Volkswagen Group A0 platform is a series of automobile platforms shared among superminis of various marques of the Volkswagen Group.

Under Volkswagen's revised platform naming system, the "A04" platform is known as the PQ24 platform, and what may have been called the A05 platform is officially the PQ25 platform. The new nomenclature is derived as follows:

- P indicates a passenger car platform
- Q (quer) indicates a transverse engine
- 2 indicates the platform size or class
- 5 indicates the generation

== A01 ==
A01 (Typ 86) platform cars:

- Audi 50 (1974–1978)
- Volkswagen Polo Mk1 (1975–1981)
- Volkswagen Derby (1977–1981)
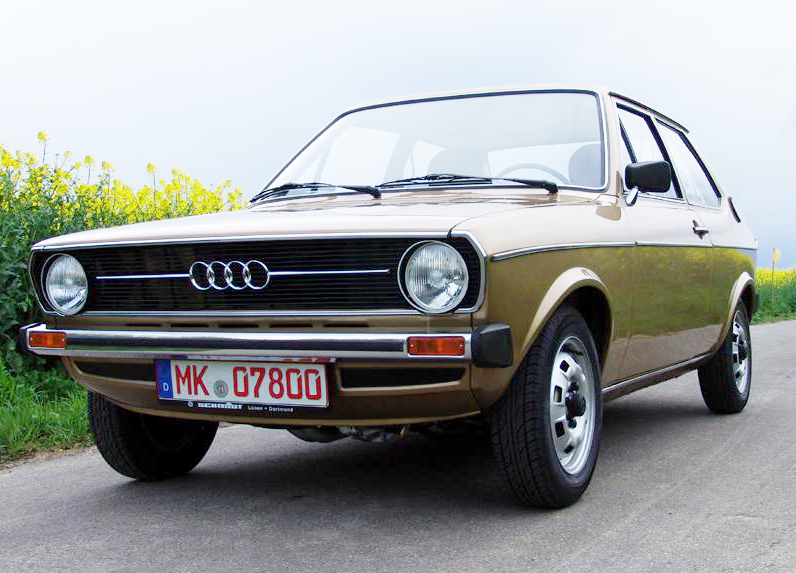
Audi 50

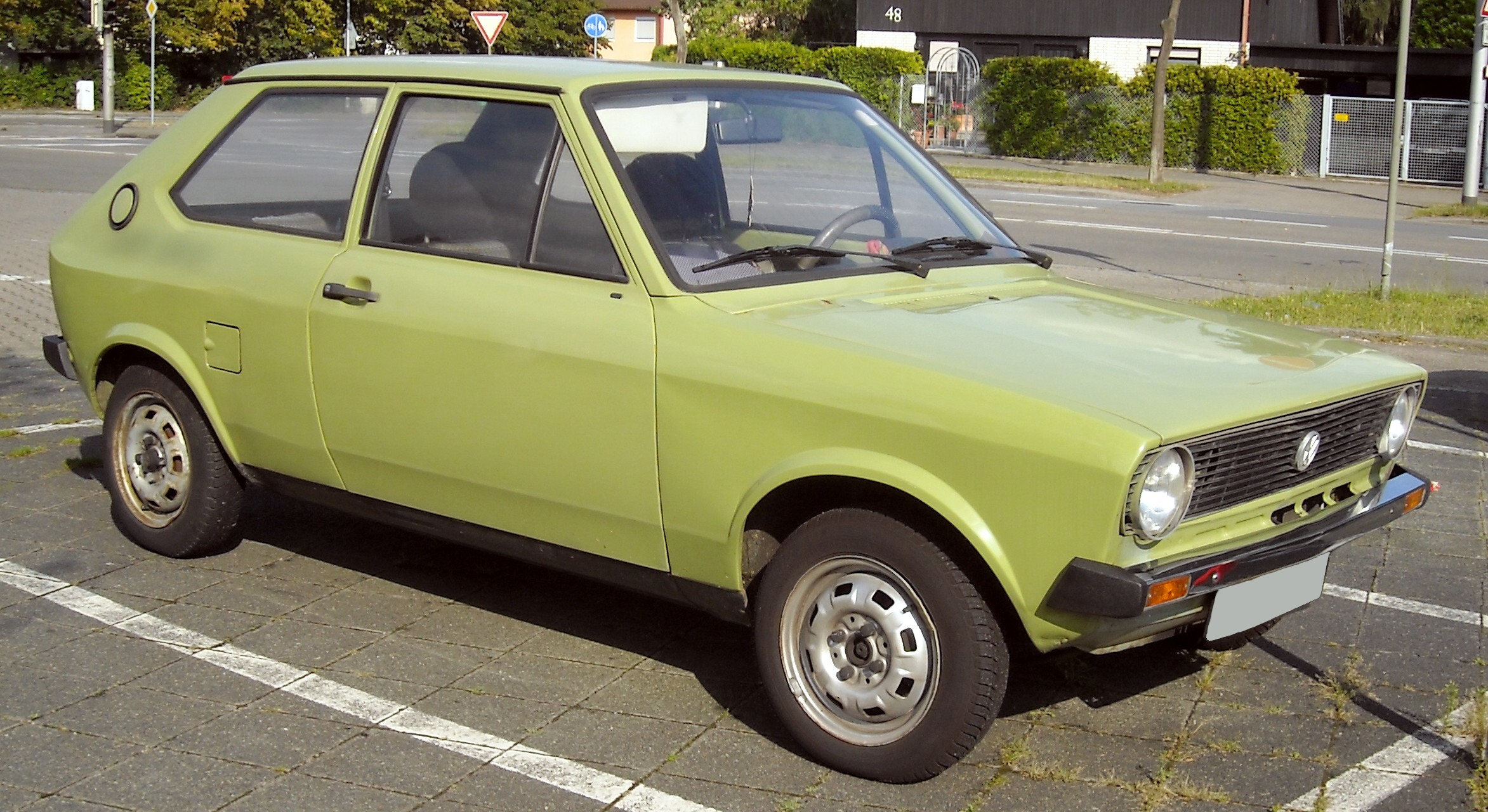
Volkswagen Polo Mk1

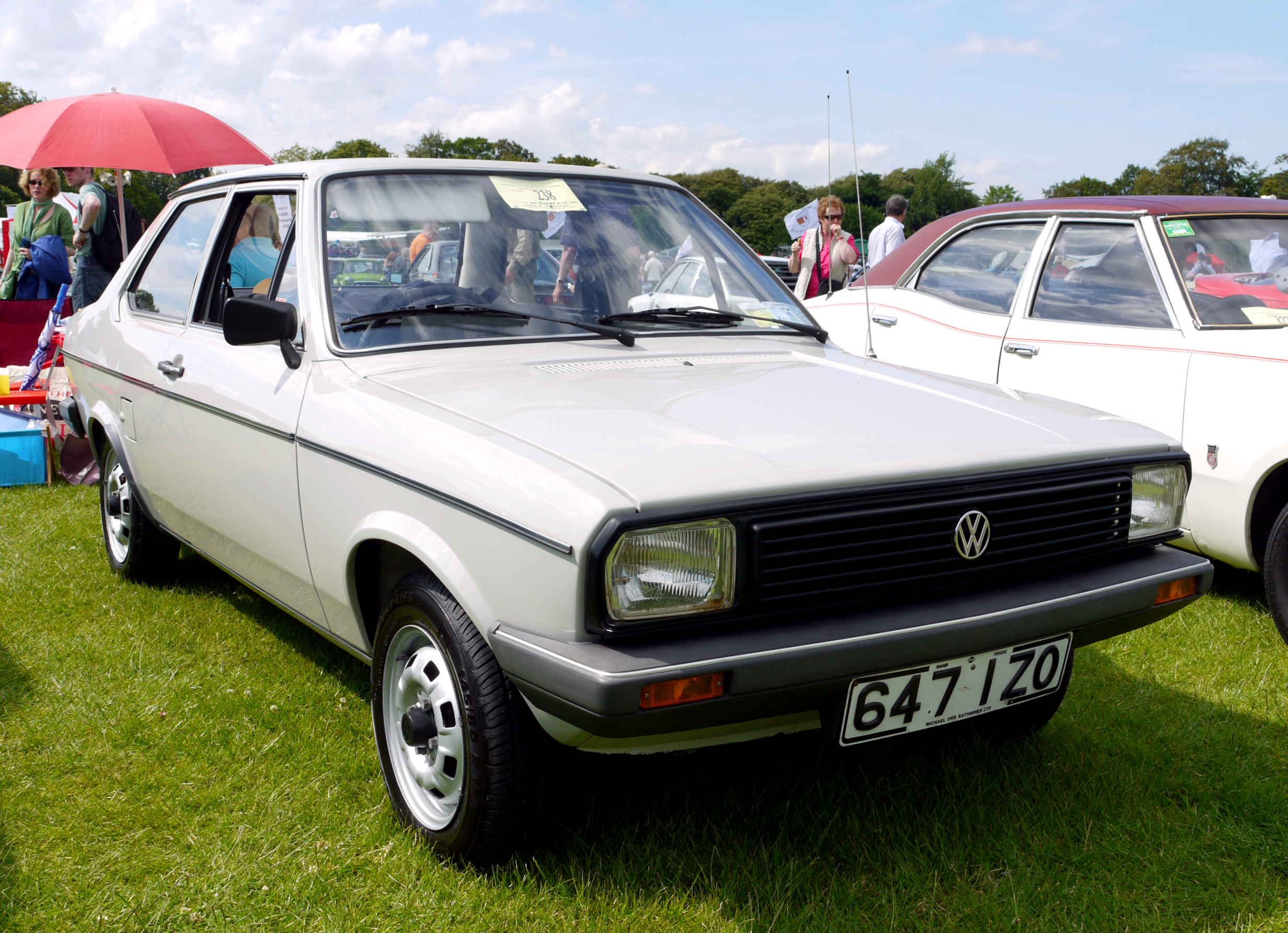
Volkswagen Derby

== A02 ==
The A02 platform is a mild development of the A01 platform.

A02 (Typ 86C) platform cars:

- Volkswagen Polo Mk2/Polo Classic/Derby (1981–1994)
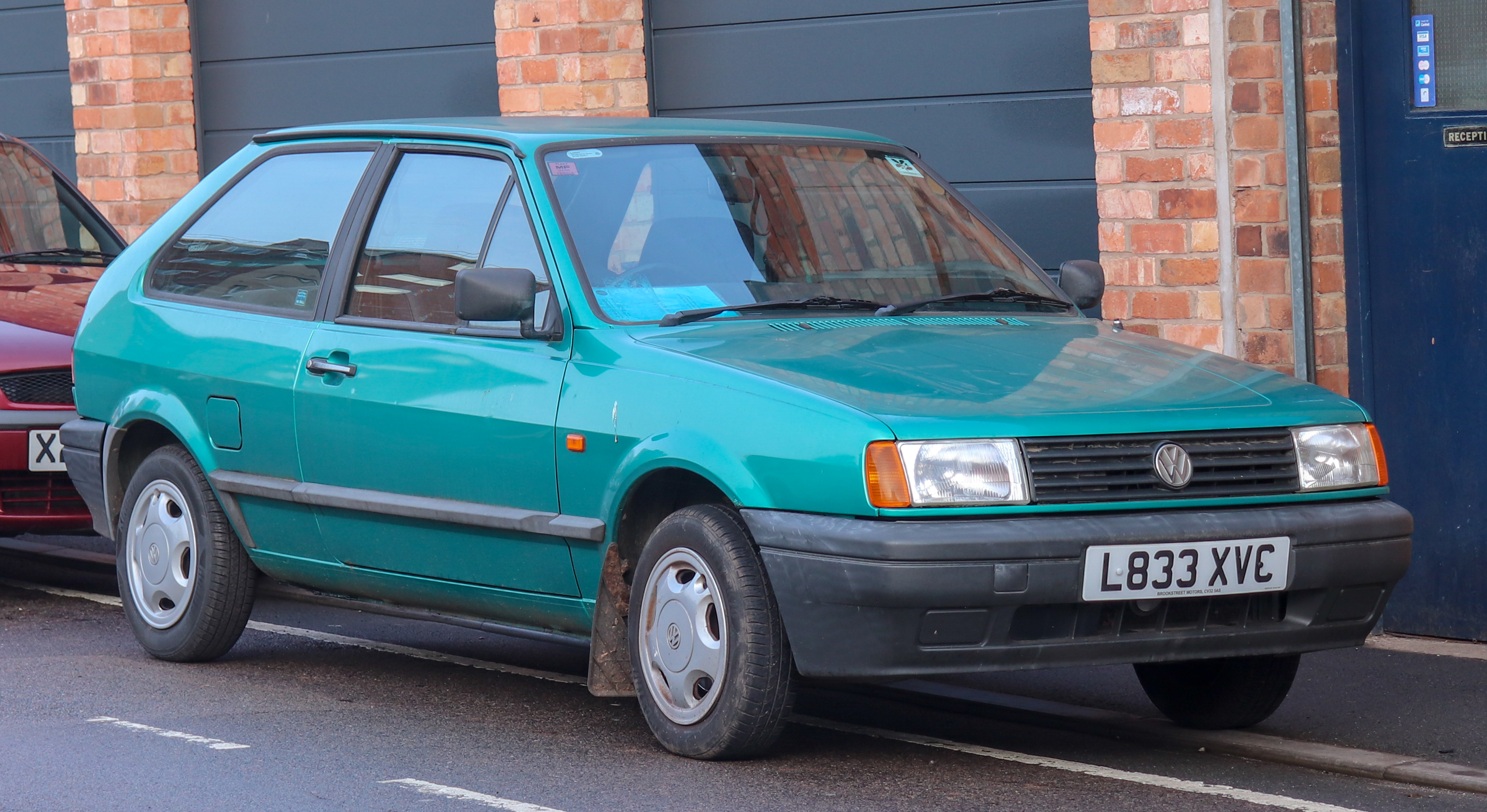
Volkswagen Polo Mk2

== A03 ==
The A03 platform is derived from the larger A3 platform used in the Golf Mk3.

A03 platform cars:

- SEAT Ibiza Mk2 (Typ 6K, 1993–2002)
- SEAT Córdoba Mk1 (Typ 6K/6KC/6KV, 1993–2002)
- Volkswagen Polo Mk3 (Typ 6N/6KV, 1994–2002)
- Volkswagen Polo Playa (1996–2002) - a rebadged SEAT Ibiza 6K with some cosmetic components from the Volkswagen Polo 6KV
- SEAT Inca van (Typ 6K9, 1997–2005)
- Volkswagen Caddy van (Typ 9K, 1996–2004)

The Volkswagen A00 platform is derived from the A03 platform as well, being a shortened version of it.

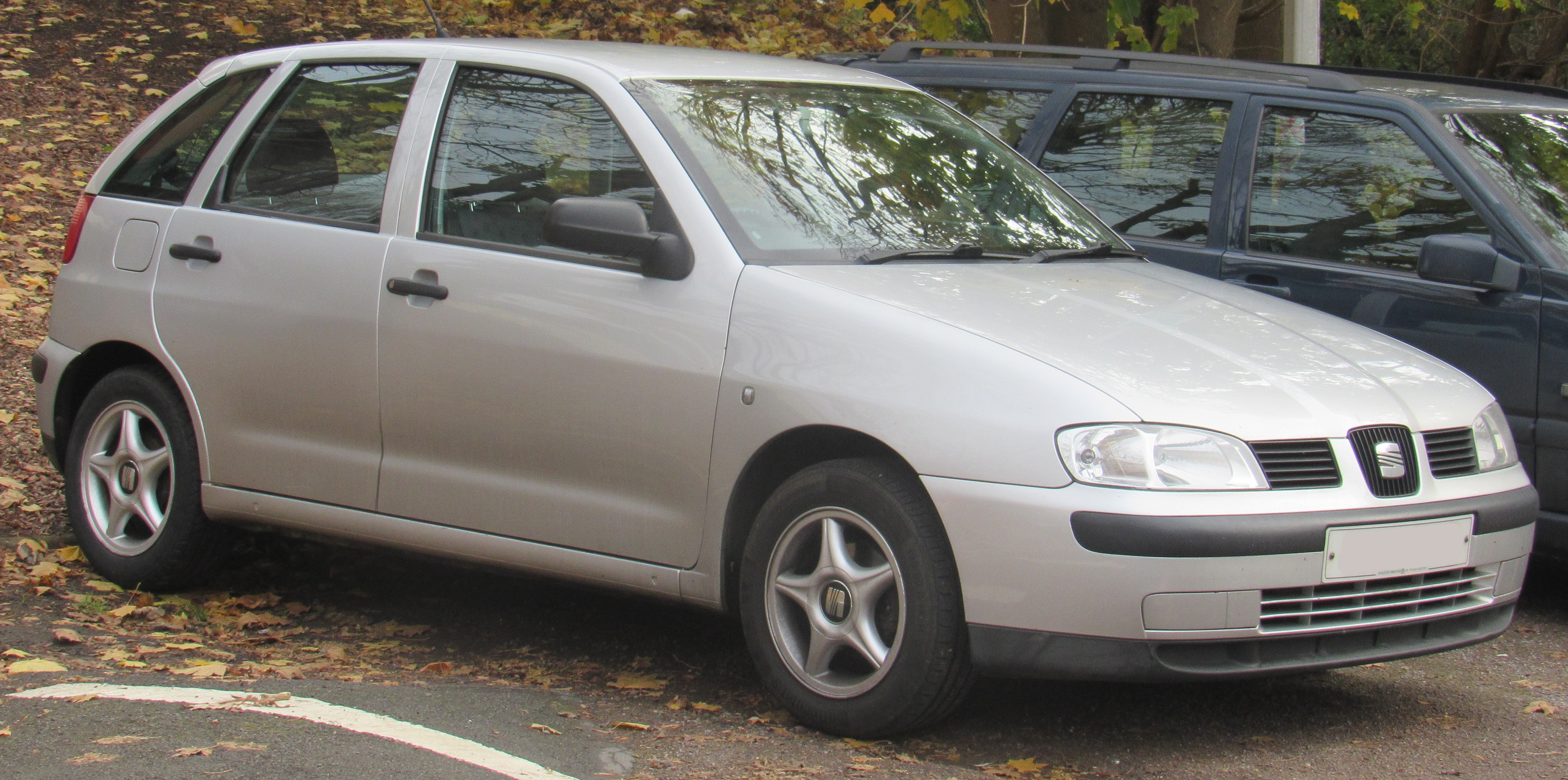
SEAT Ibiza Mk2

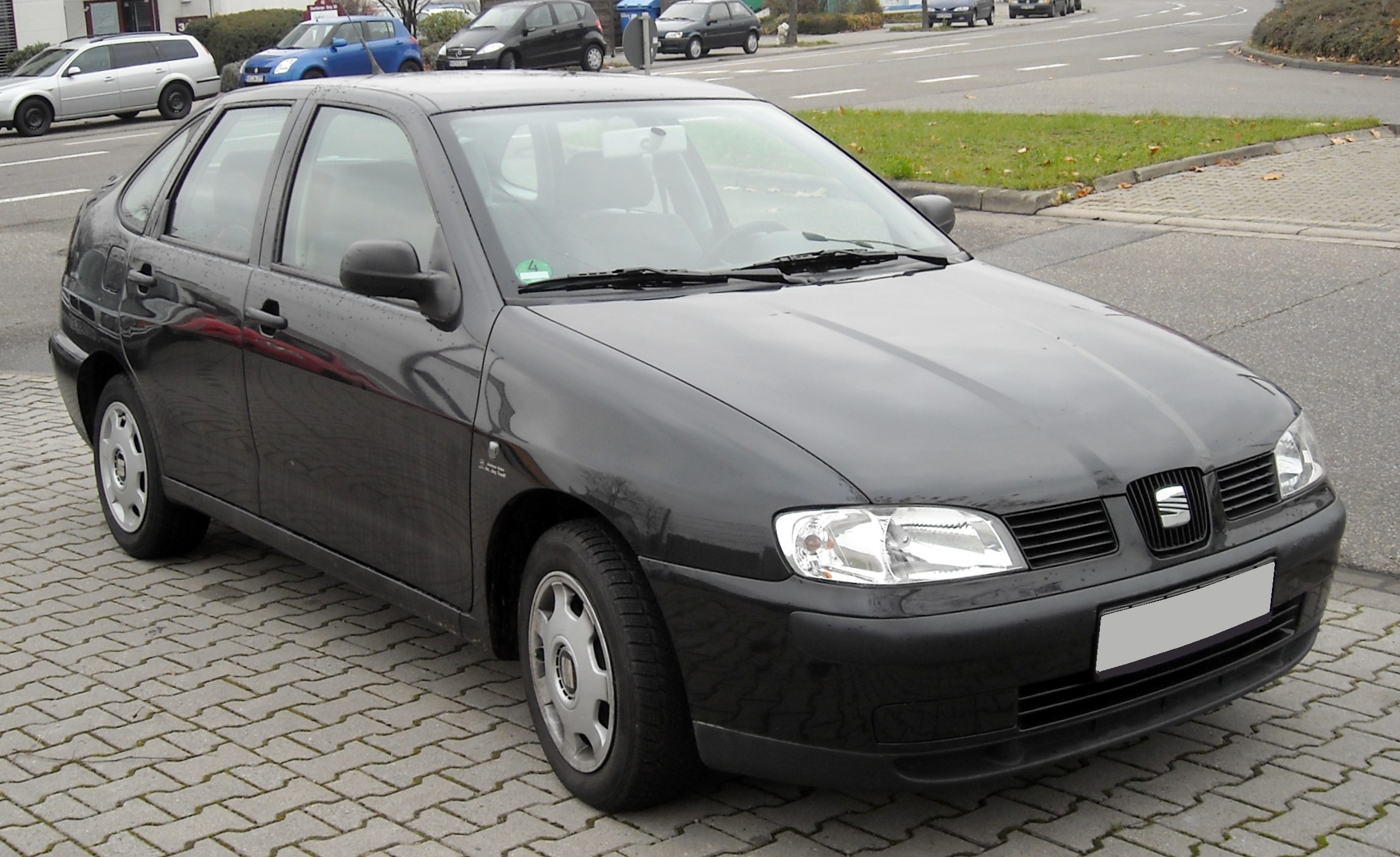
SEAT Córdoba Mk1

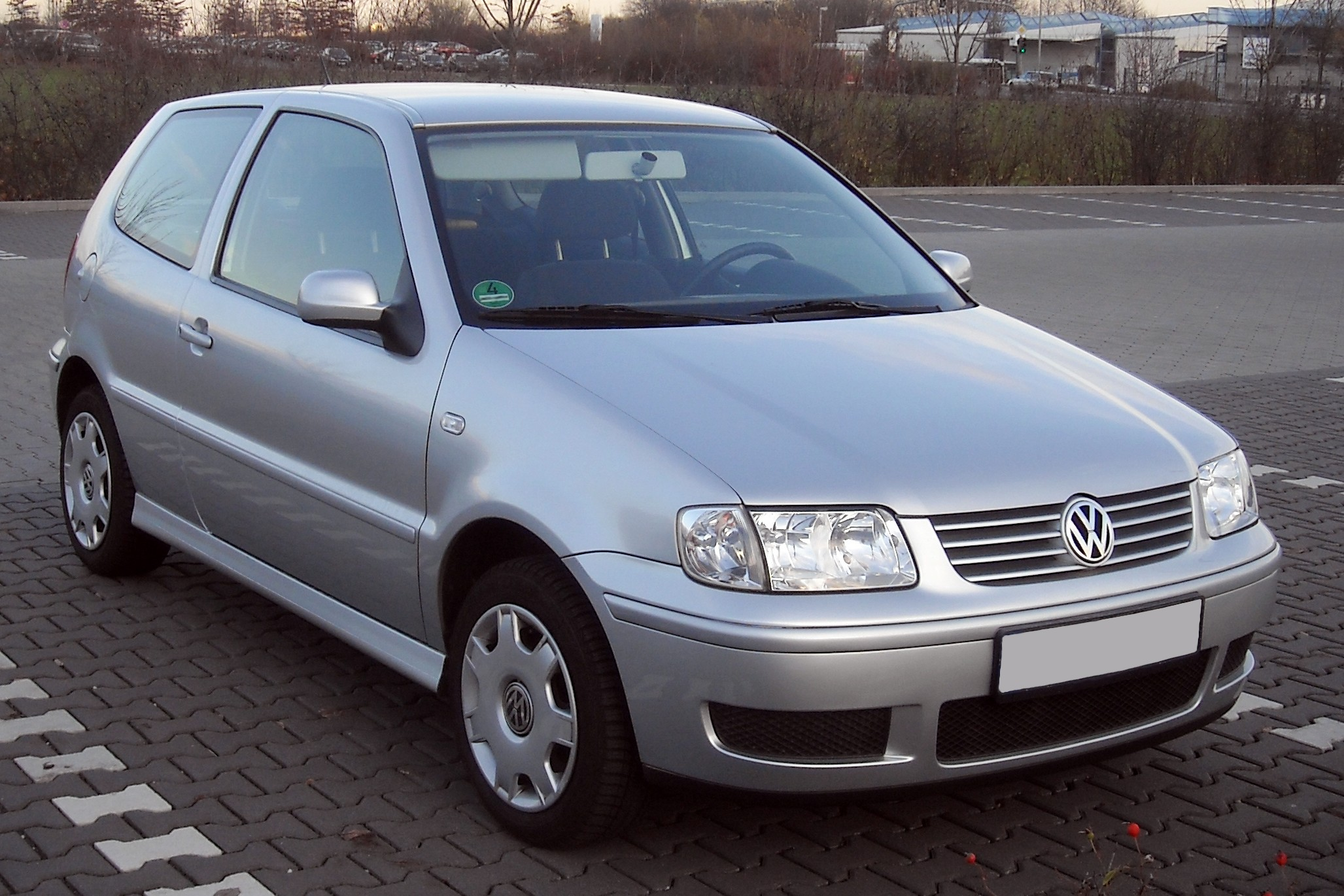
Volkswagen Polo Mk3

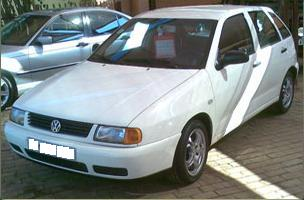
Volkswagen Polo Playa

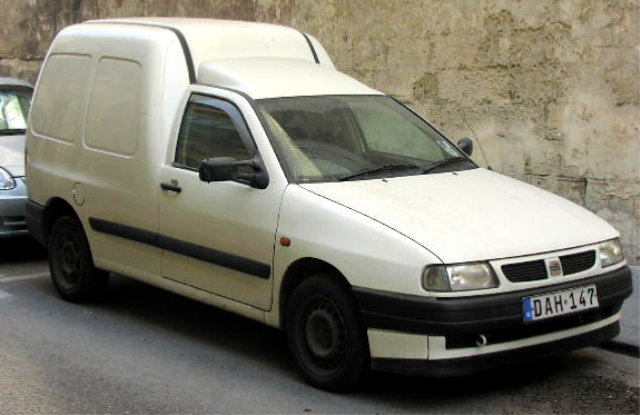
SEAT Inca

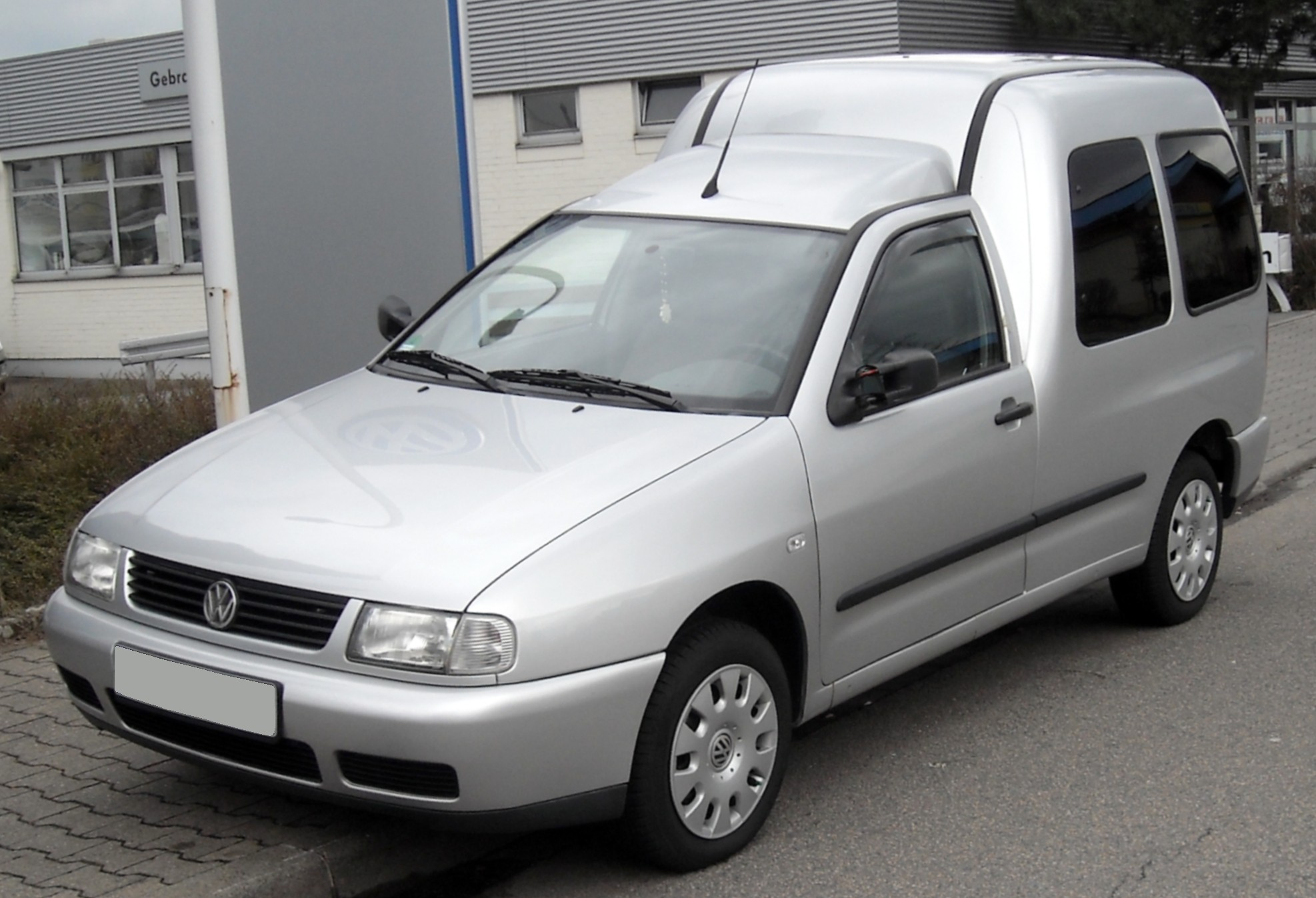
Volkswagen Caddy

== A04 (PQ24) ==
The A04 platform is derived from the larger A4 platform as used in the Golf Mk4 among others.

The Skoda Roomster goes as far as being based on both the A04 platform and A4 platform.

A04 platform cars, now officially referred to as the PQ24 platform:

- Škoda Fabia Mk1 (Typ 6Y, 1999–2007)
- Audi A2 (Typ 8Z, 1999–2005)
- Volkswagen Polo Mk4 (Typ 9N, 2001–2009)
- SEAT Ibiza Mk3 (Typ 6L, 2002–2008)
- SEAT Córdoba Mk2 (Typ 6L, 2002–2009)
- Volkswagen Fox (Typ 5Z, 2003–2021)
- Volkswagen Suran/SpaceFox (Typ 5Z6, 2006–2019)
- Škoda Fabia Mk2 (Typ 5J, 2007–2014, uses portions of PQ24 and PQ25 platform)
- Volkswagen Gol Mk3 (Typ 5U, 2008–2023, PQ24/25 hybrid)
- Volkswagen Voyage Mk2 (Typ 5U, 2008–2023, PQ24/25 hybrid)
- Volkswagen Saveiro Mk3 (Typ 5U, 2009–2026, PQ24/25 hybrid)
- Škoda Roomster Mk1 (Typ 5J, 2006–2015)
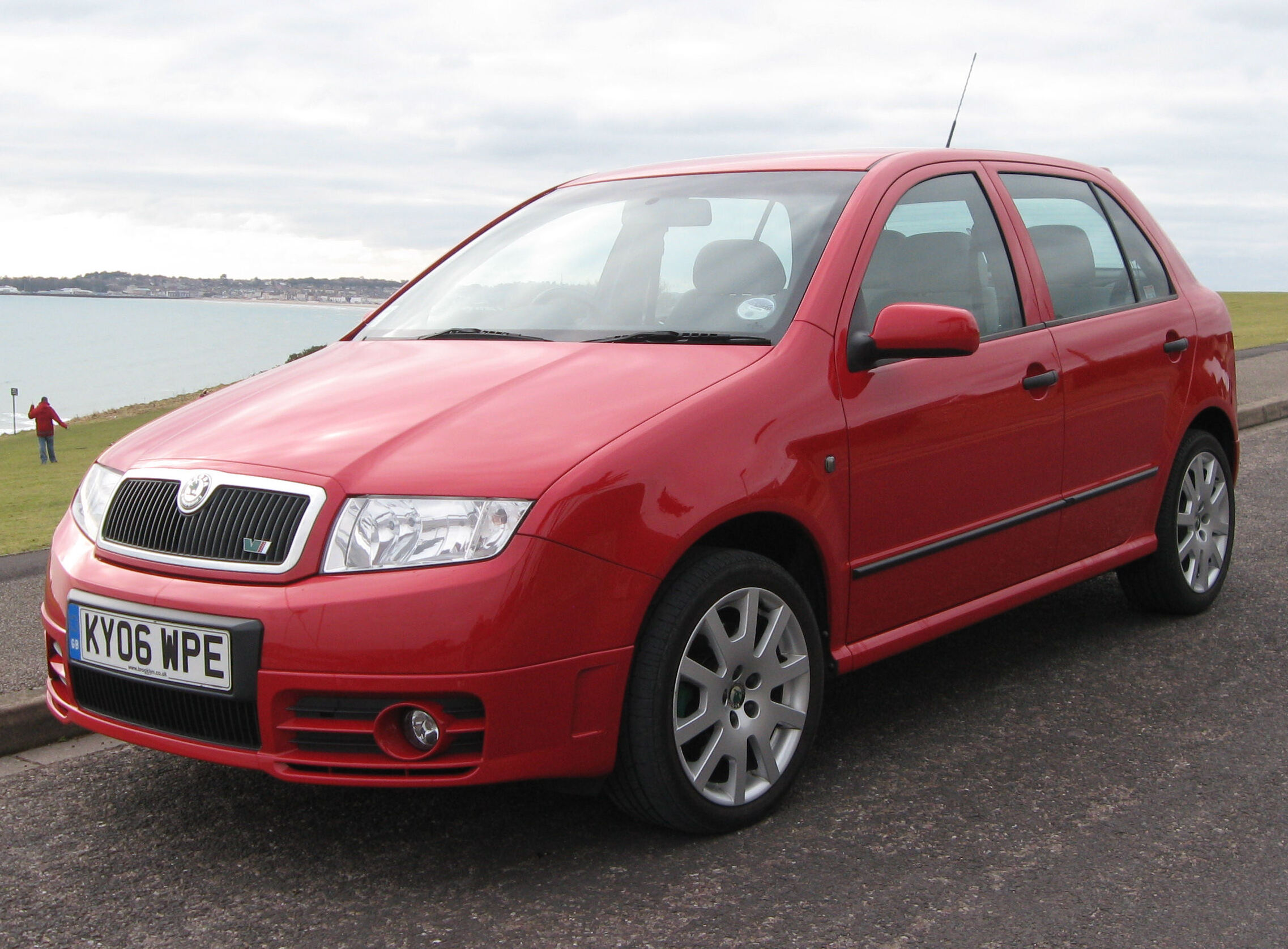
Škoda Fabia Mk1

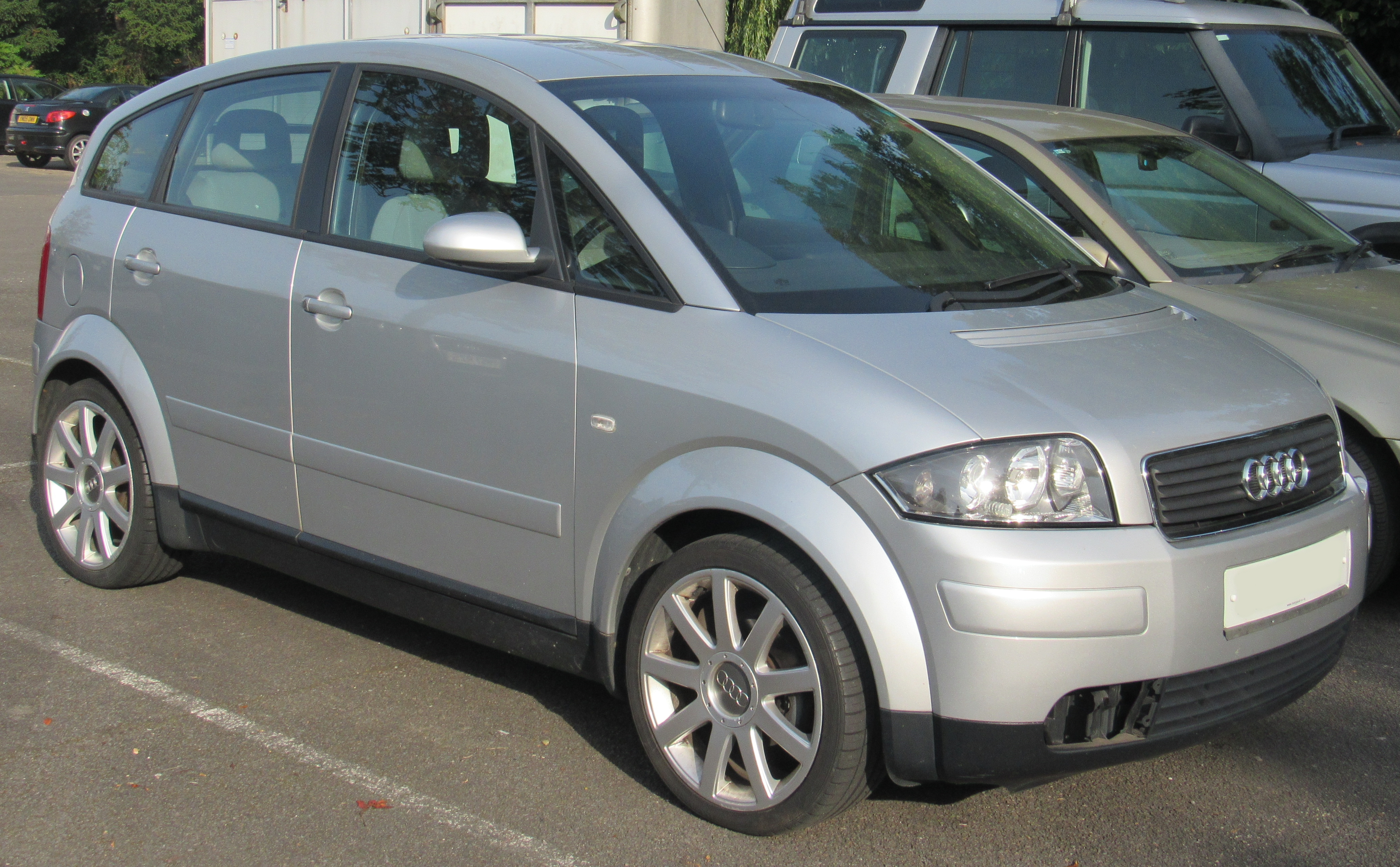
Audi A2

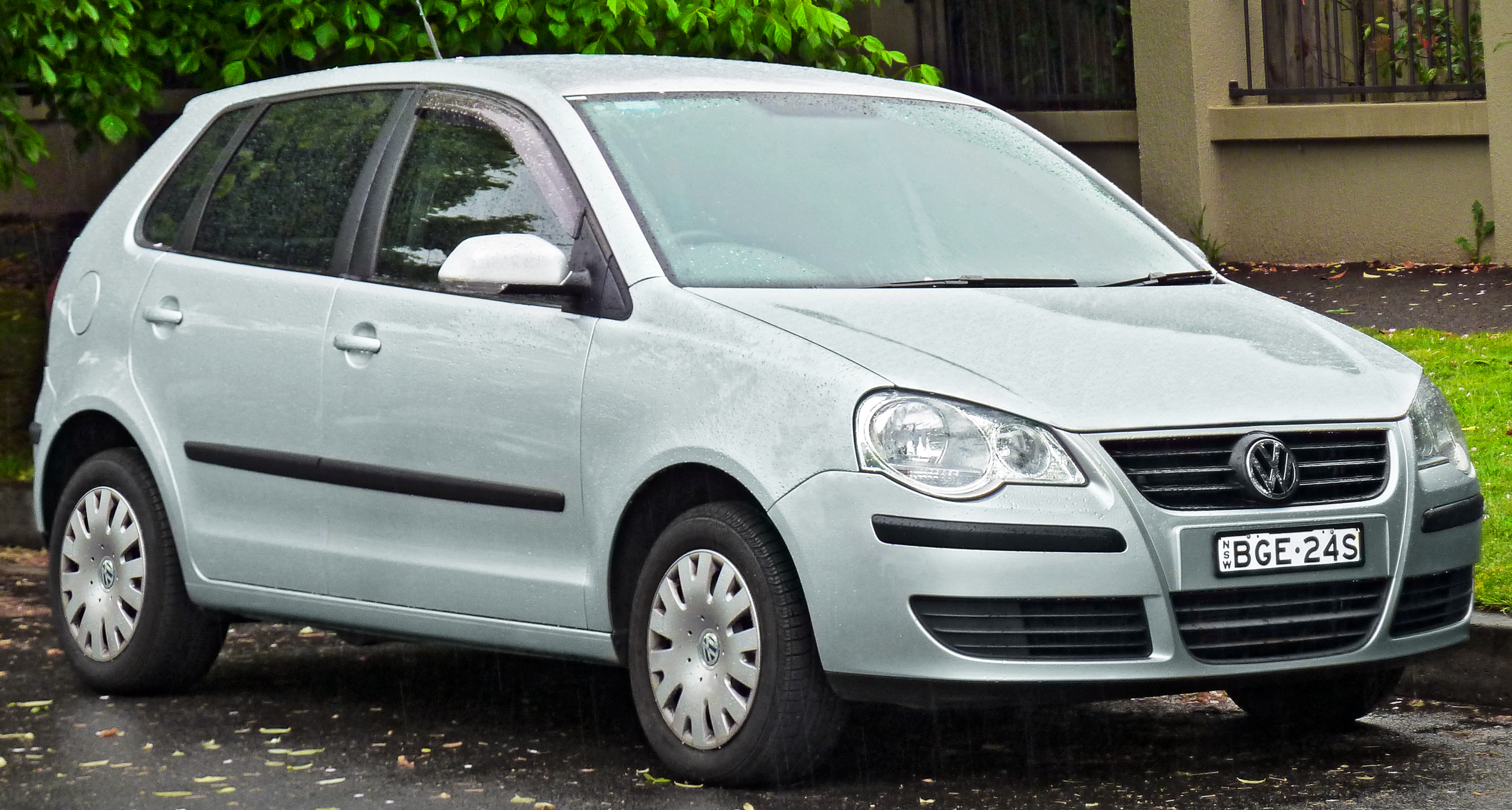
Volkswagen Polo Mk4

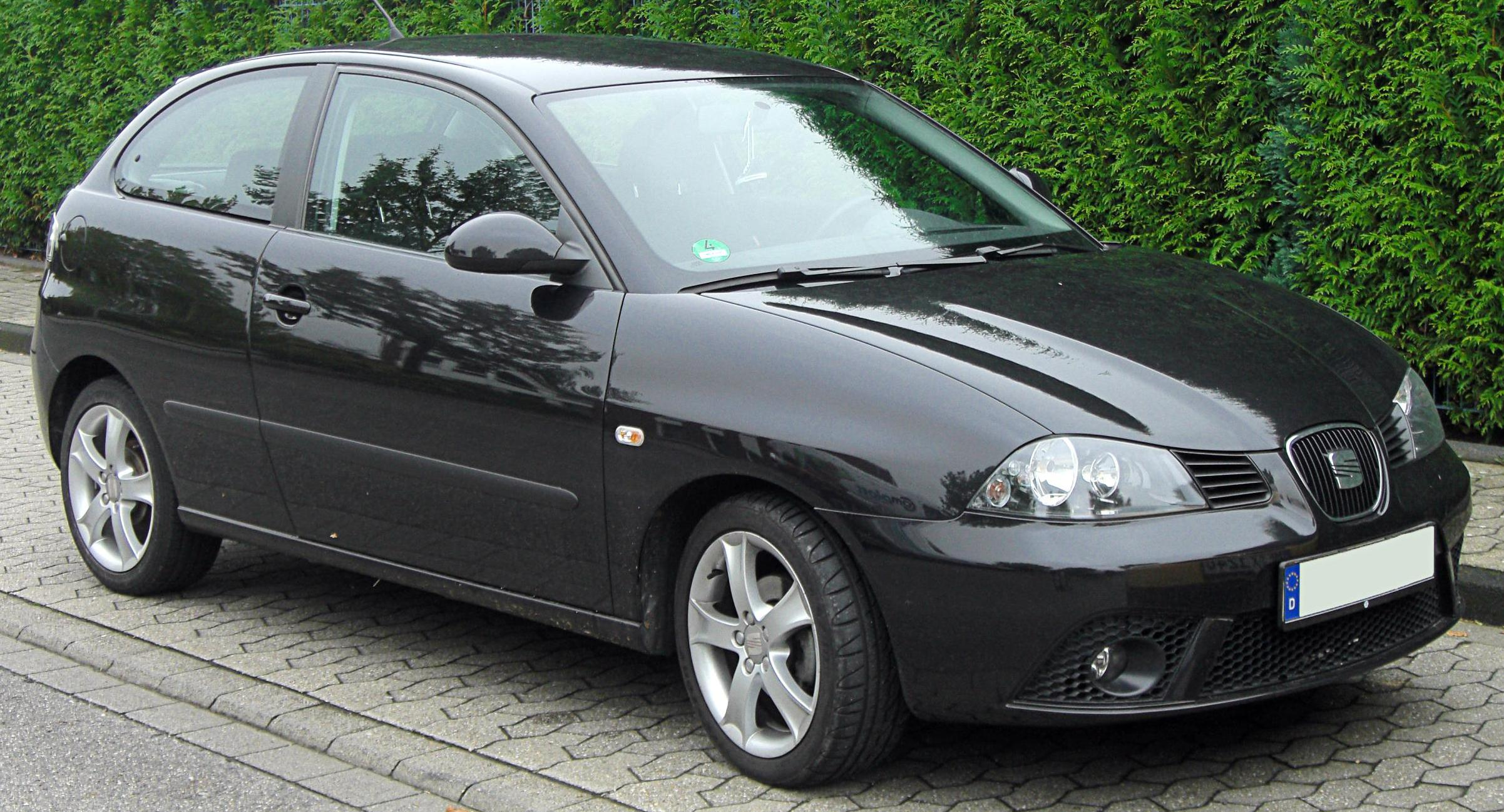
SEAT Ibiza Mk3

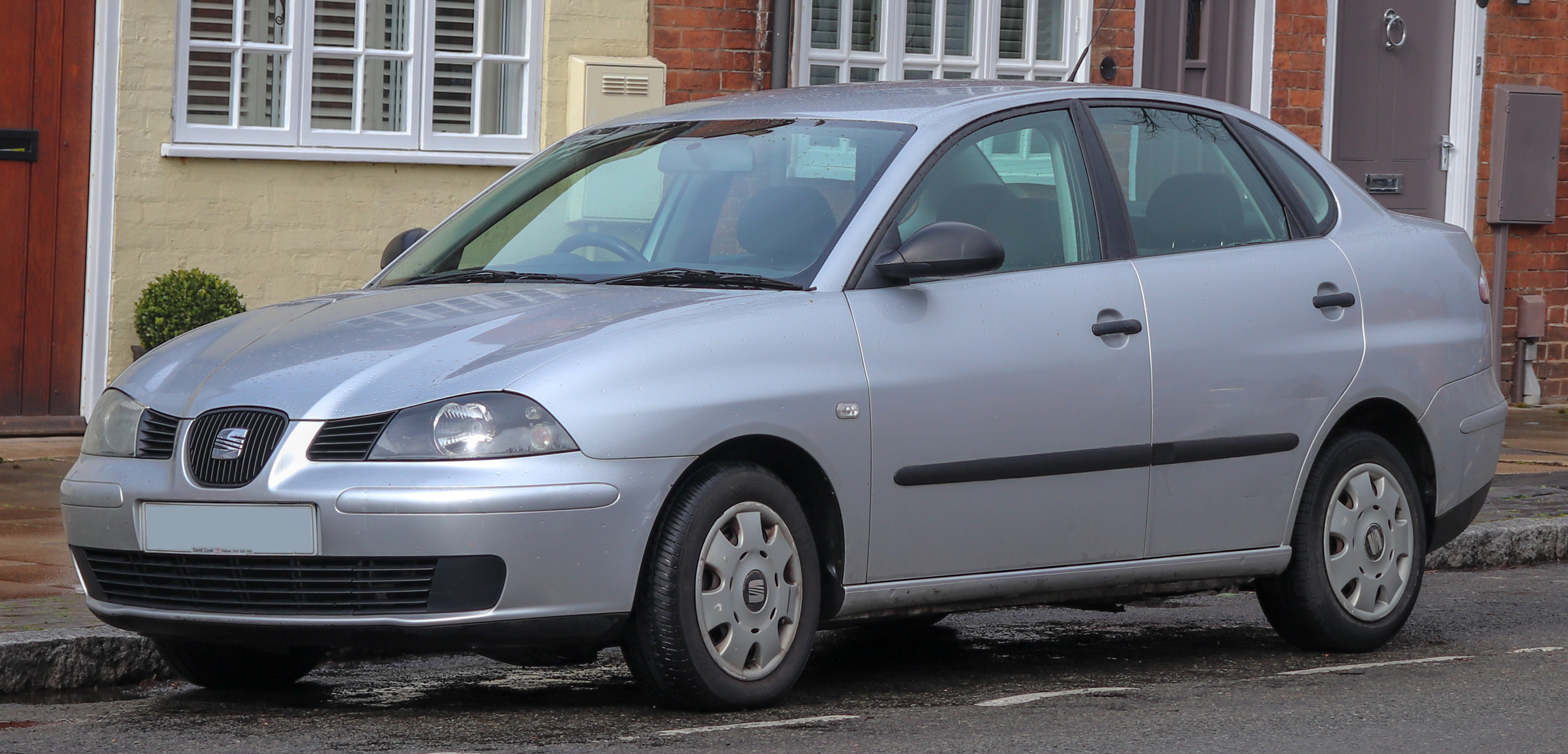
SEAT Córdoba Mk2

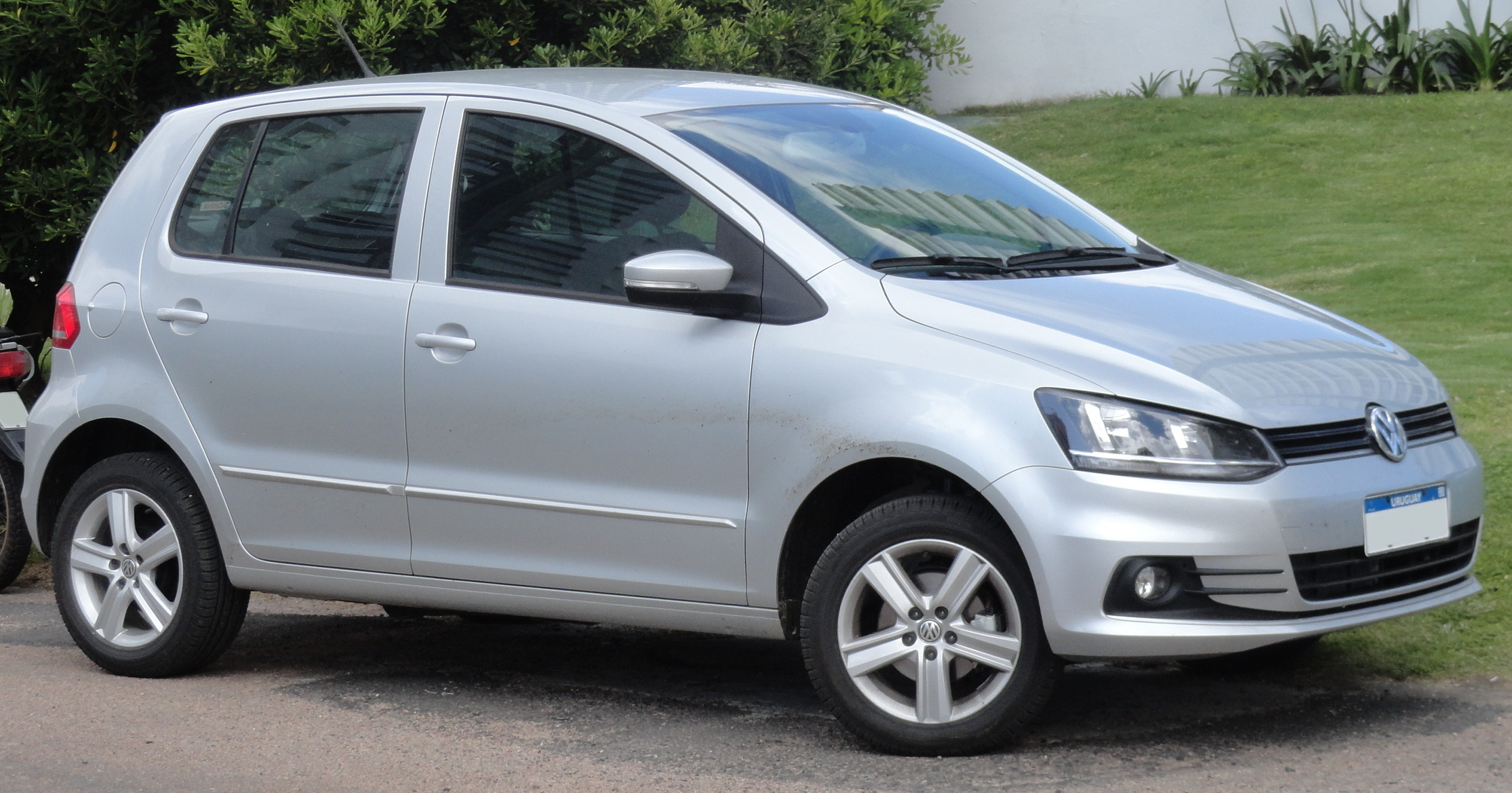
Volkswagen Fox

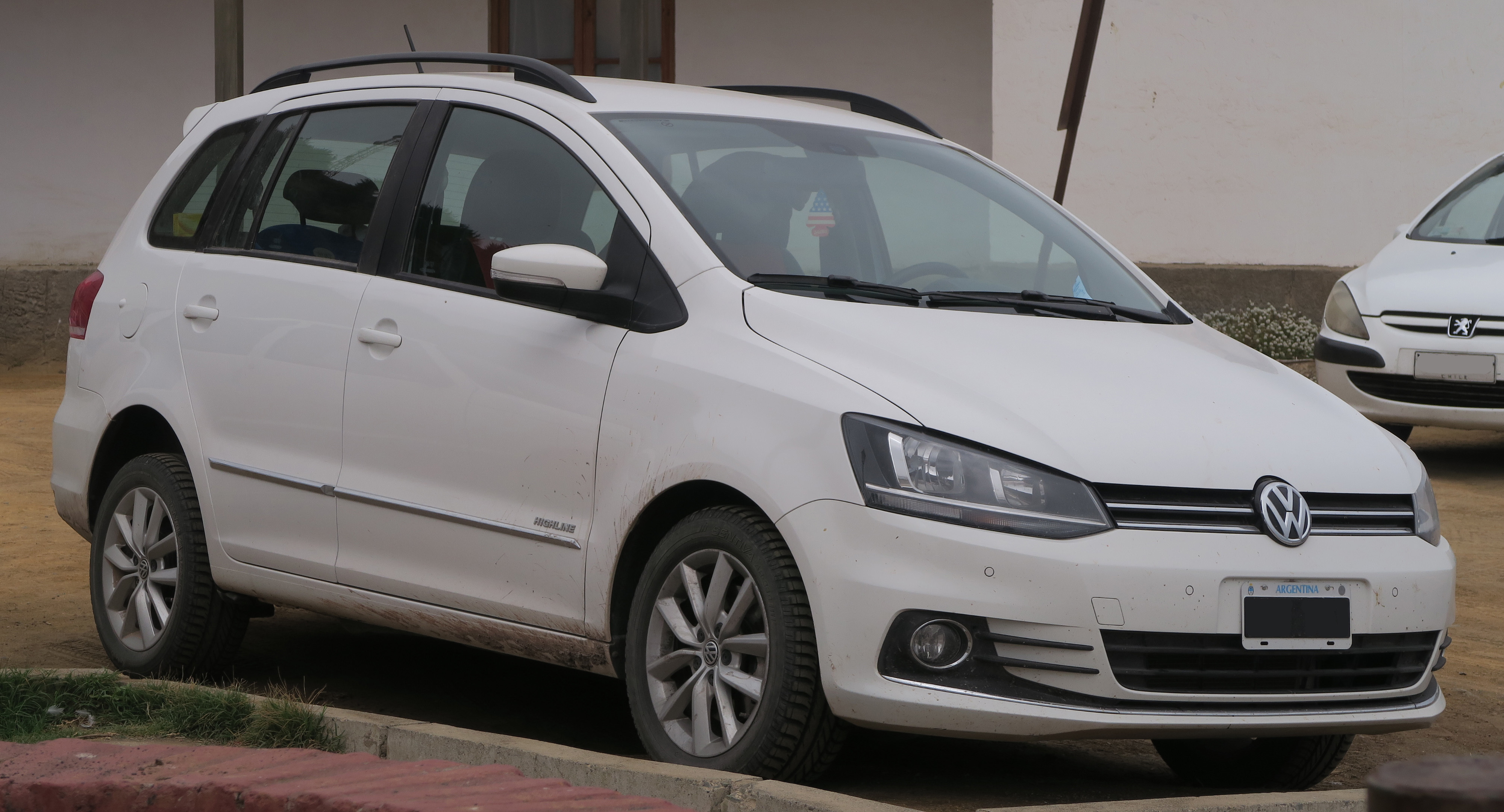
Volkswagen Suran

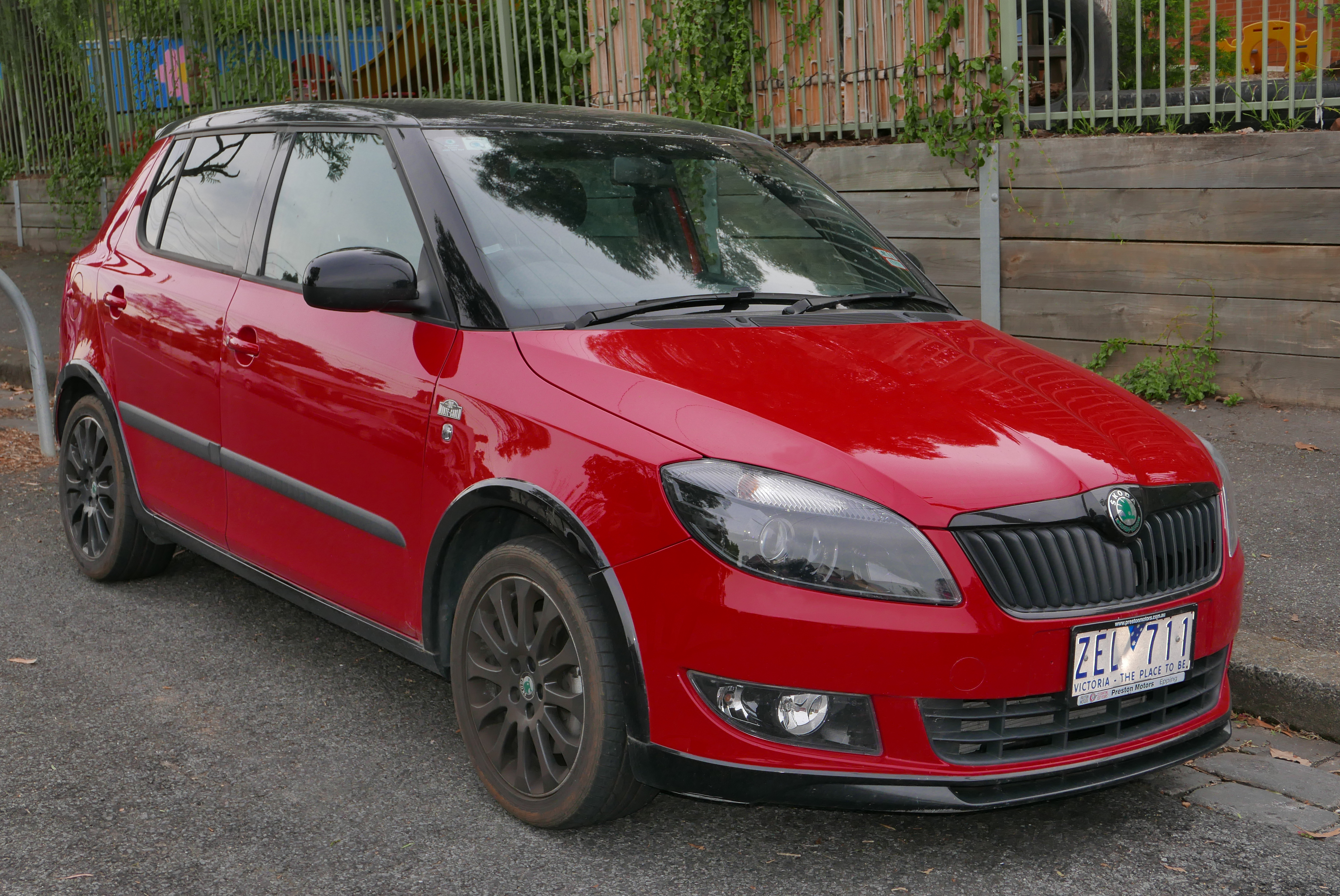
Škoda Fabia Mk2

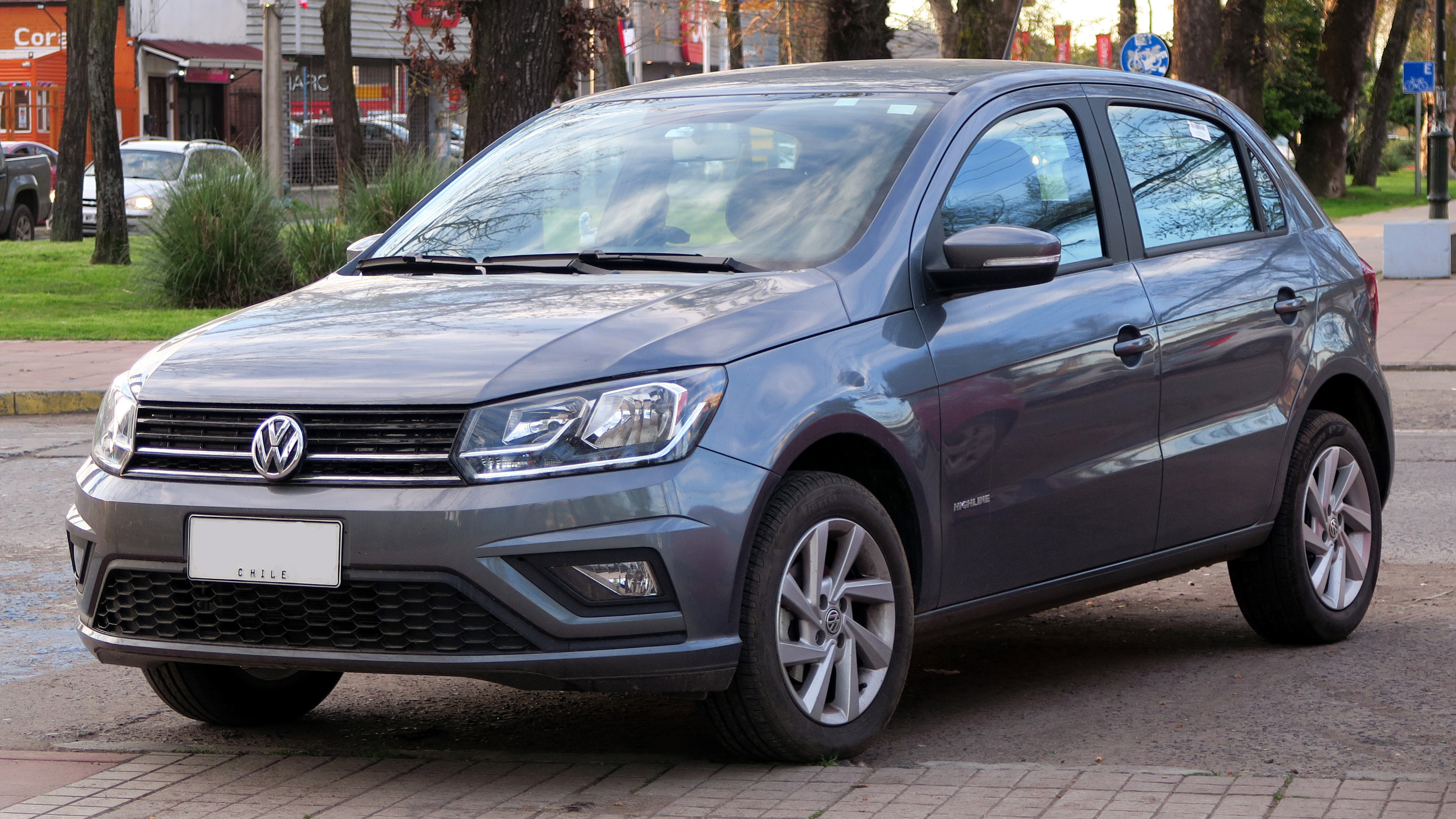
Volkswagen Gol Mk3

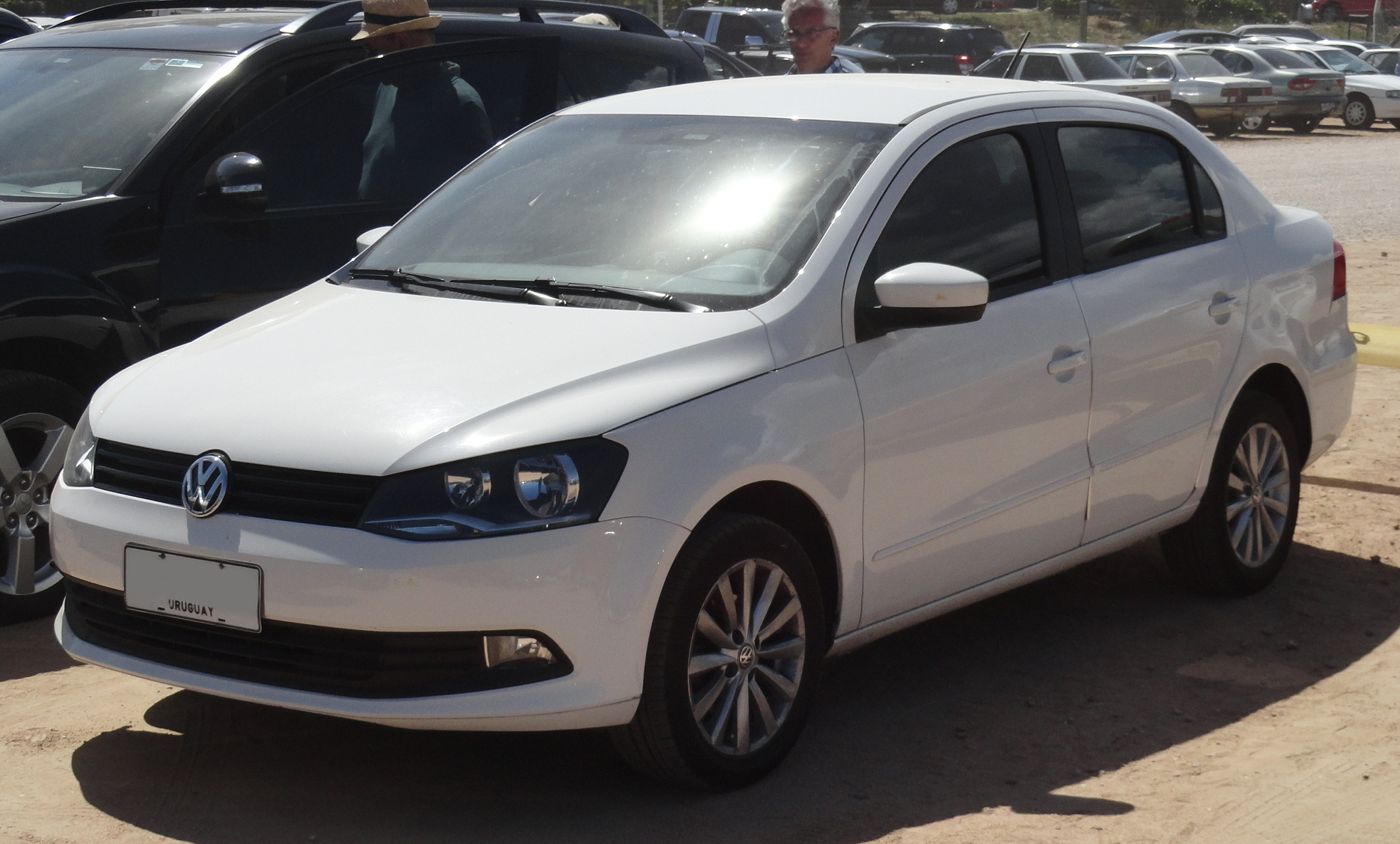
Volkswagen Voyage Mk2

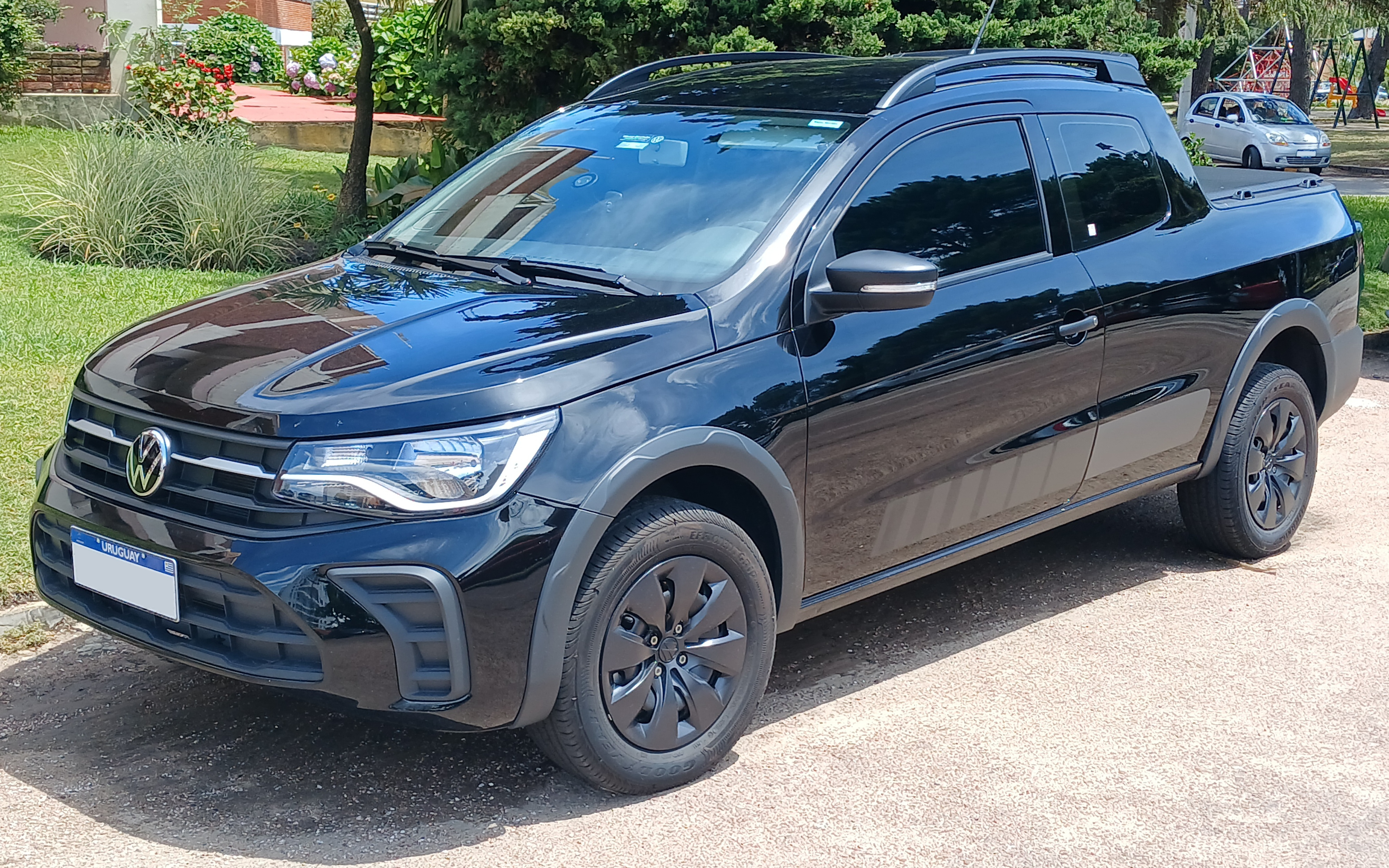
Volkswagen Saveiro Mk3

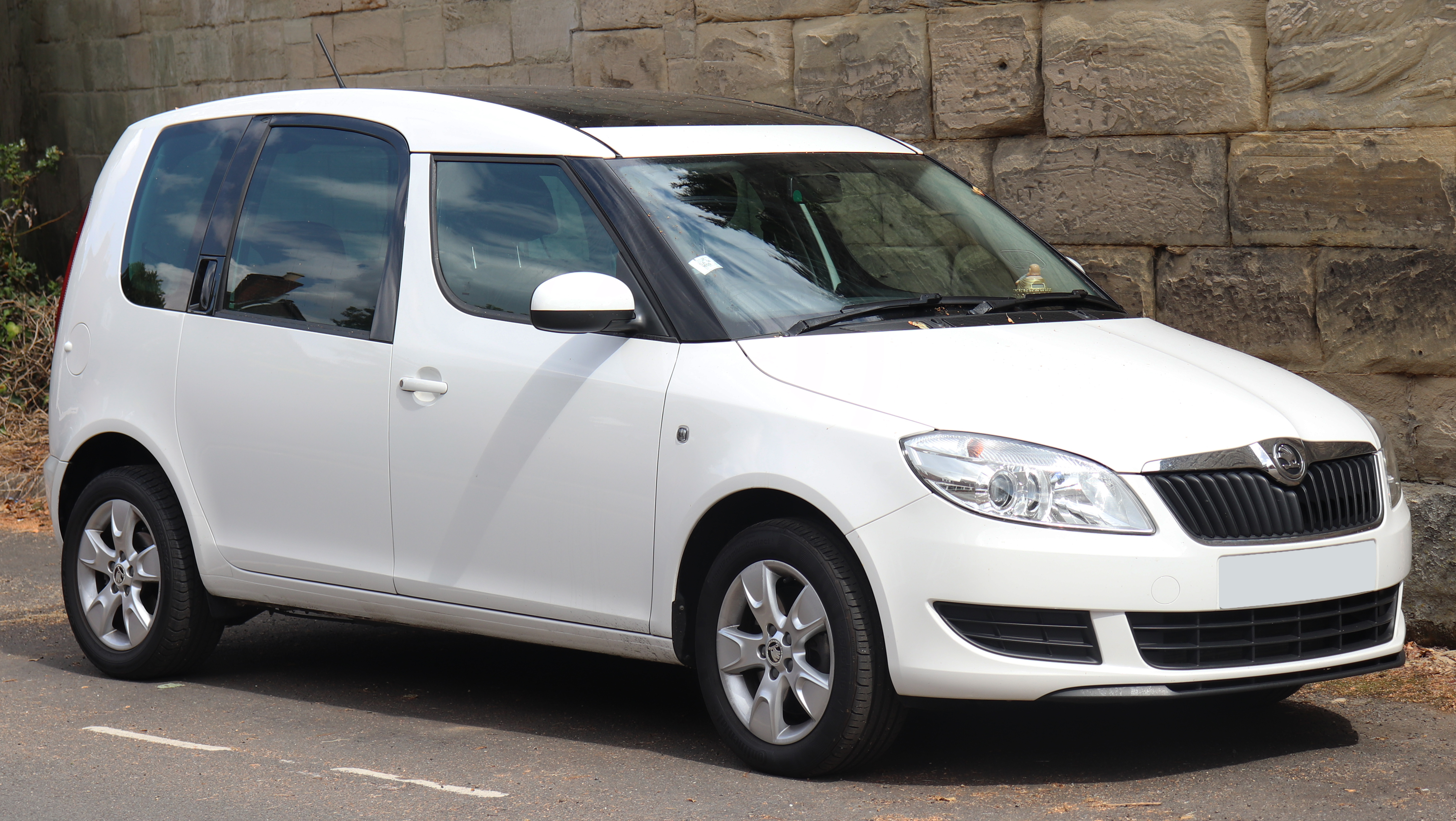
Škoda Roomster

== A05 (PQ25) ==
PQ25 is a development of the PQ24 platform with the possibility of all-wheel drive, informally known as A05.

- SEAT Ibiza Mk4 (Typ 6J, 2008–2015)
- Volkswagen Polo Mk5 Pre-Facelift (Typ 6R, 2009–2014; Typ 61, 2010–present)
- Audi A1 (Typ 8X, 2010–2018)
- Škoda Rapid (Typ NA, 2011–2021, only for Indian market)
- Volkswagen Vento (Typ 60, 2010–2022)

"New A05+"

- Škoda Rapid (Typ NH, 2012–MY2014)
- SEAT Toledo Mk4 (Typ KG, 2012–2018)
- Volkswagen Santana (Typ BR, 2012–2022, China)
- Volkswagen New Jetta (Typ BS, 2013–2019, China)
- Jetta VA3 (Typ 0M, 2019–present, China)
- Volkswagen Polo (Typ CK, 2020–2022, Russia)
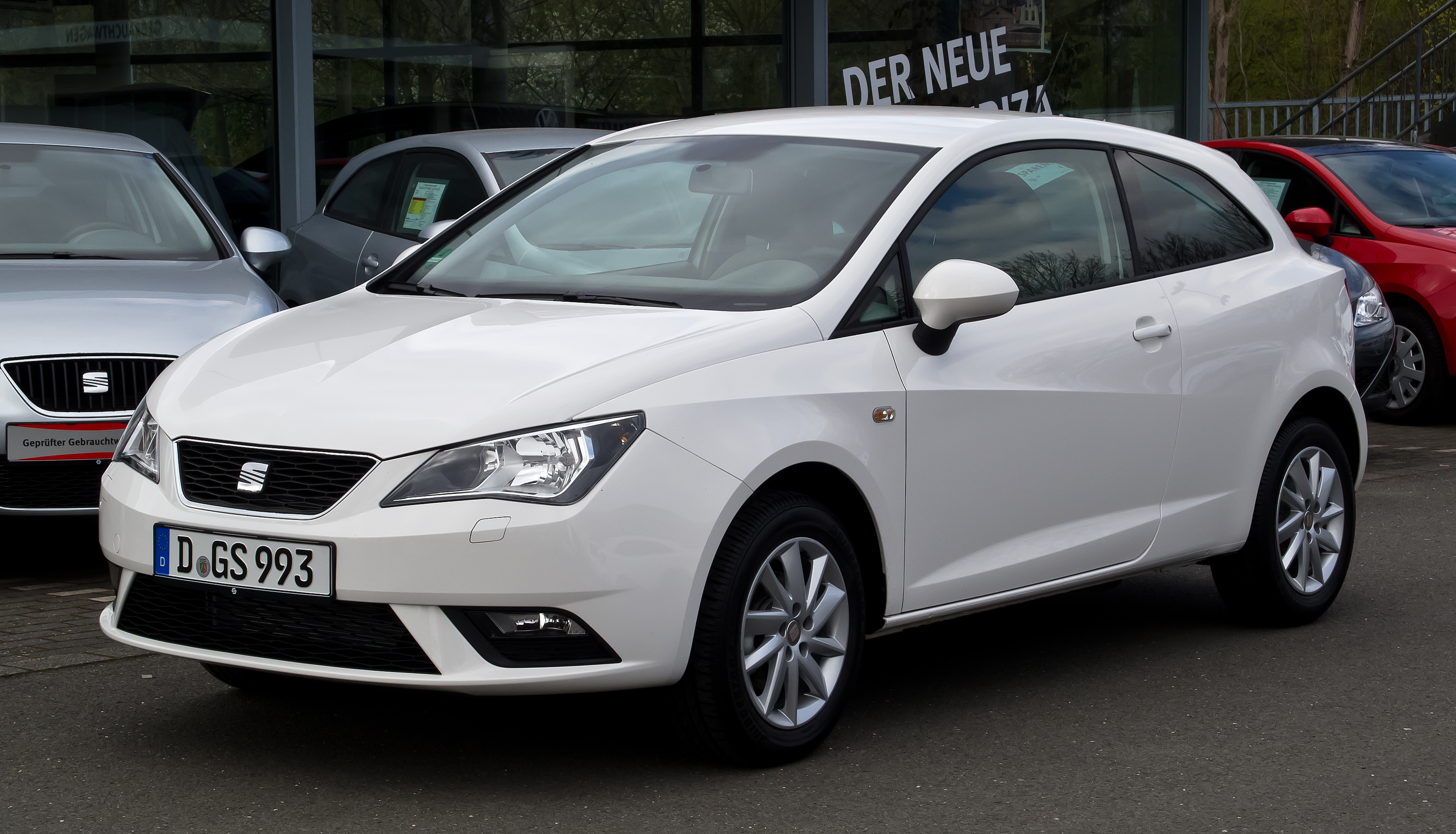
SEAT Ibiza Mk4

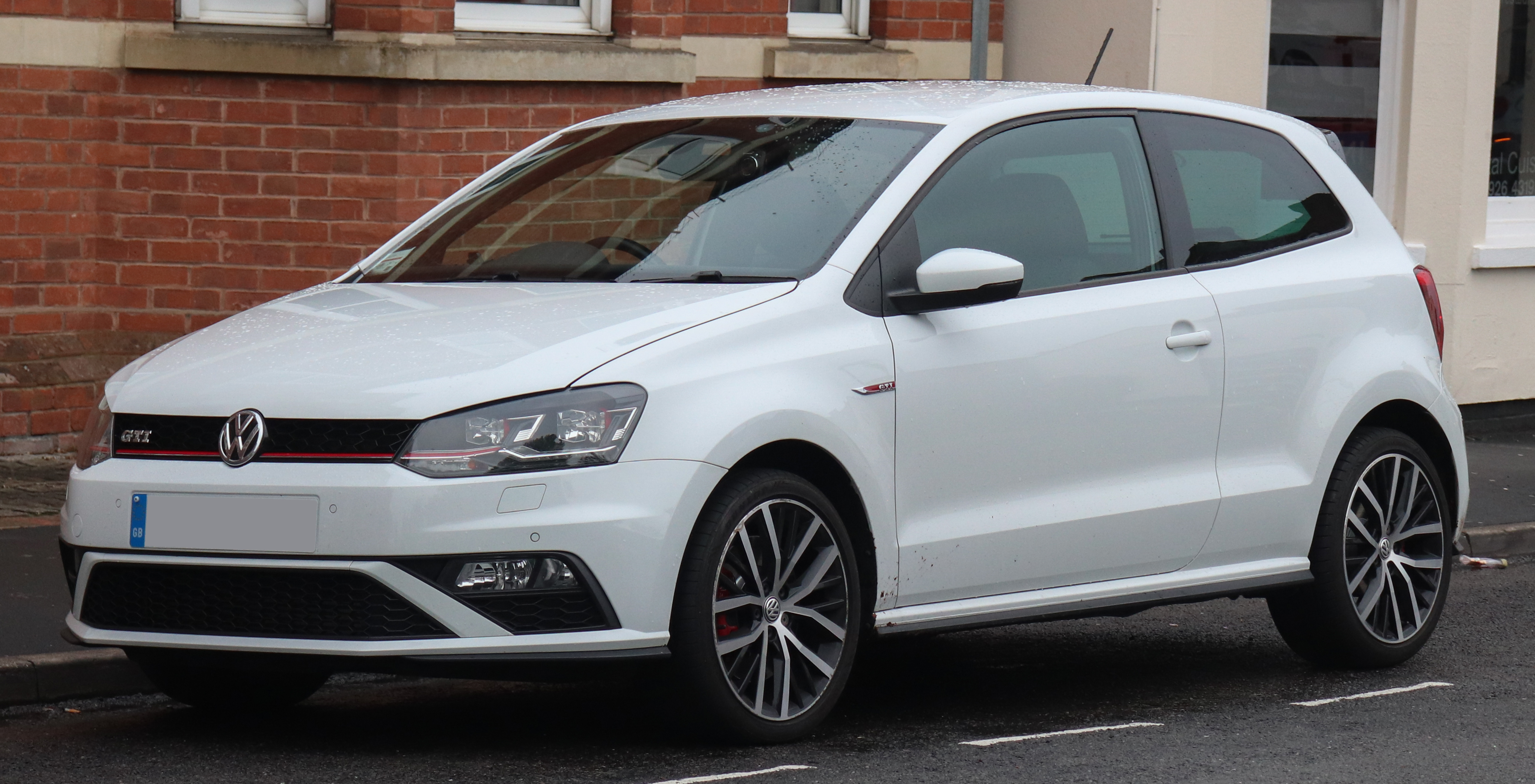
Volkswagen Polo Mk5

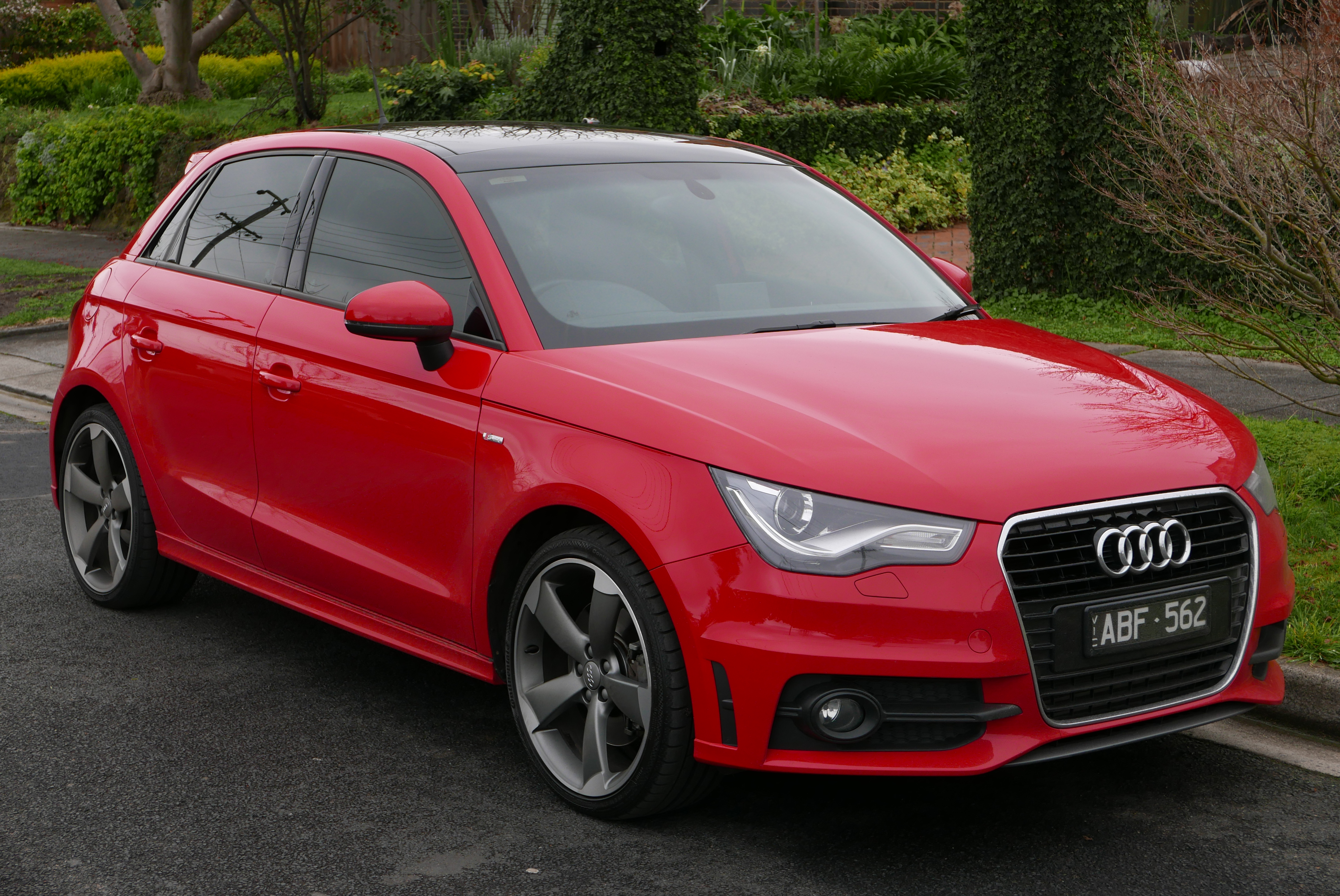
Audi A1

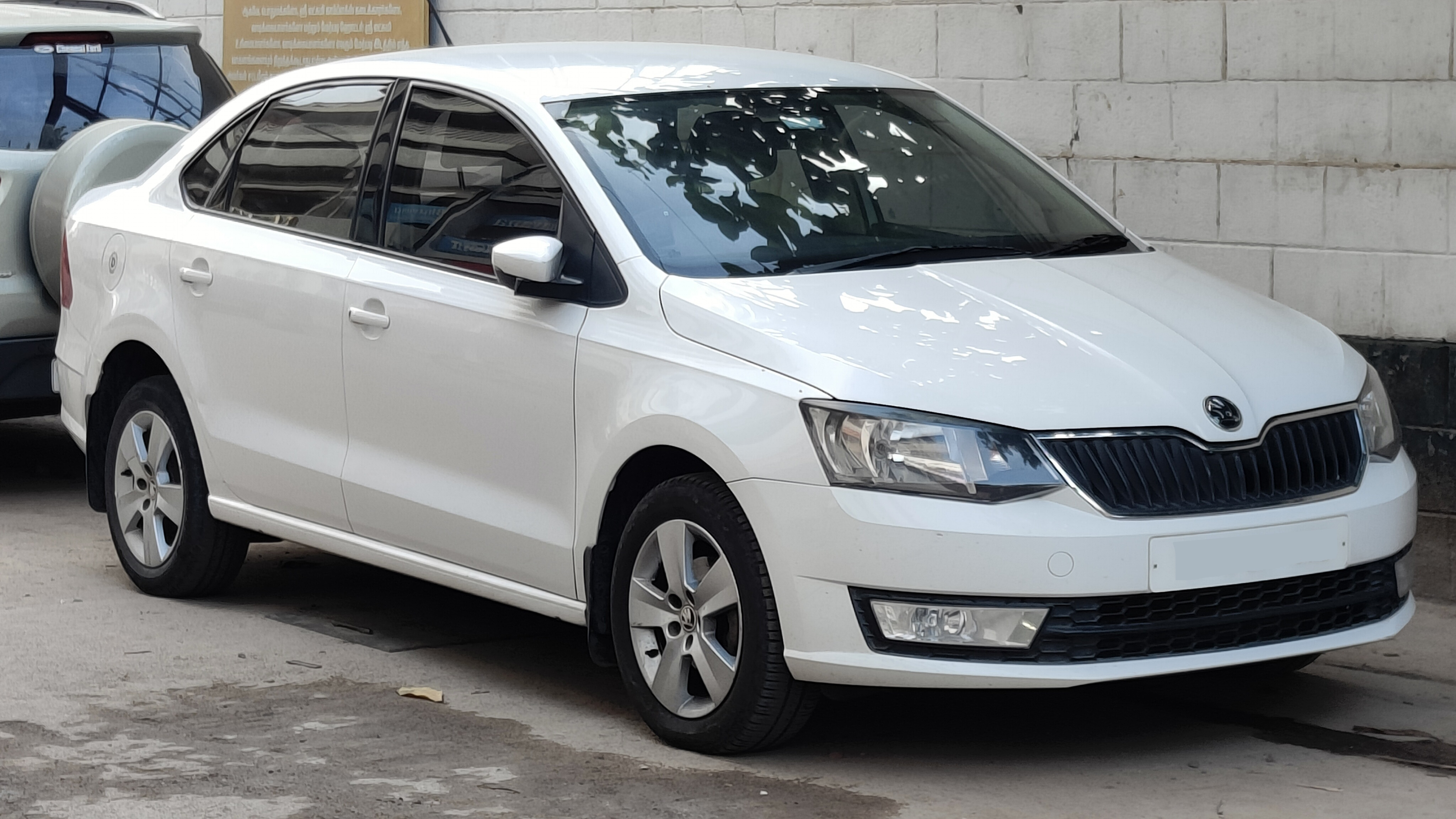
Škoda Rapid (India)

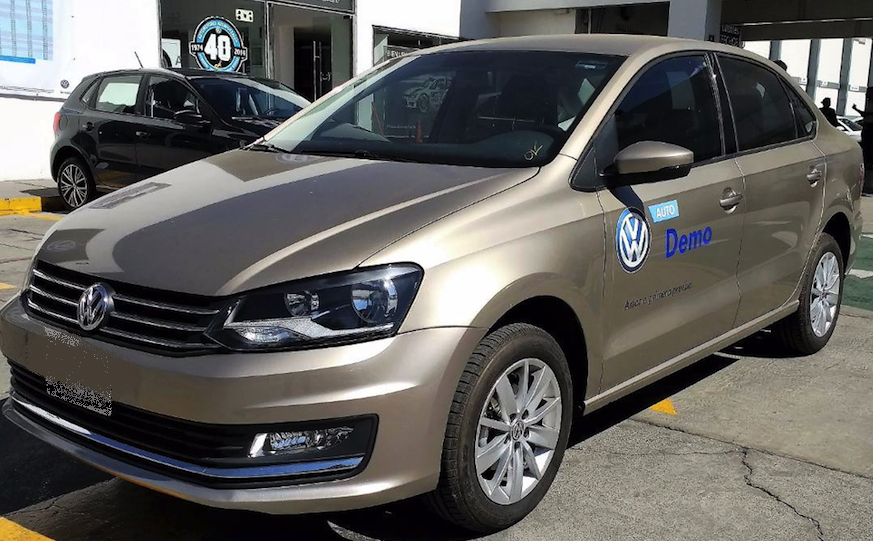
Volkswagen Vento (A05)

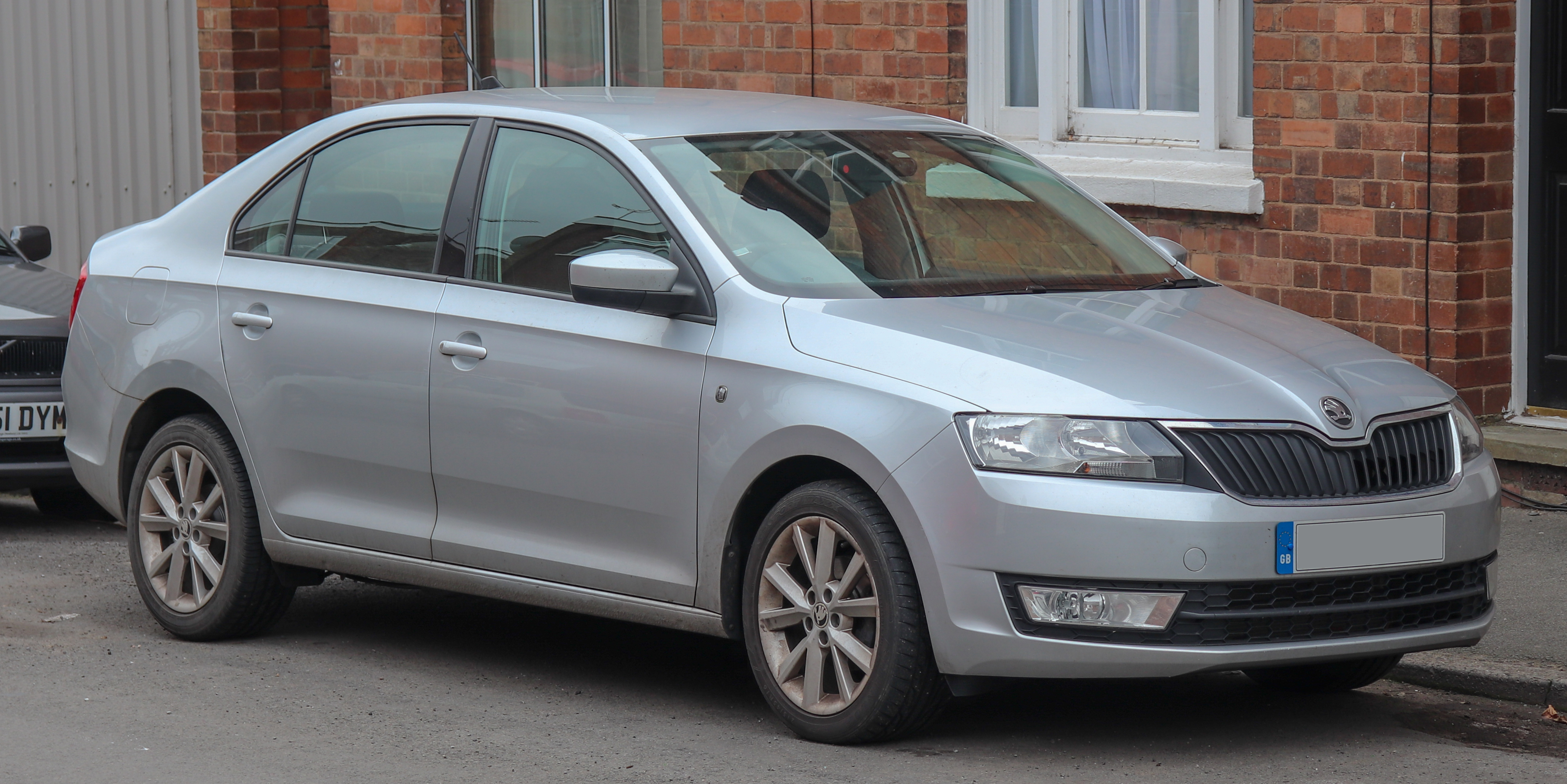
Škoda Rapid (2012)

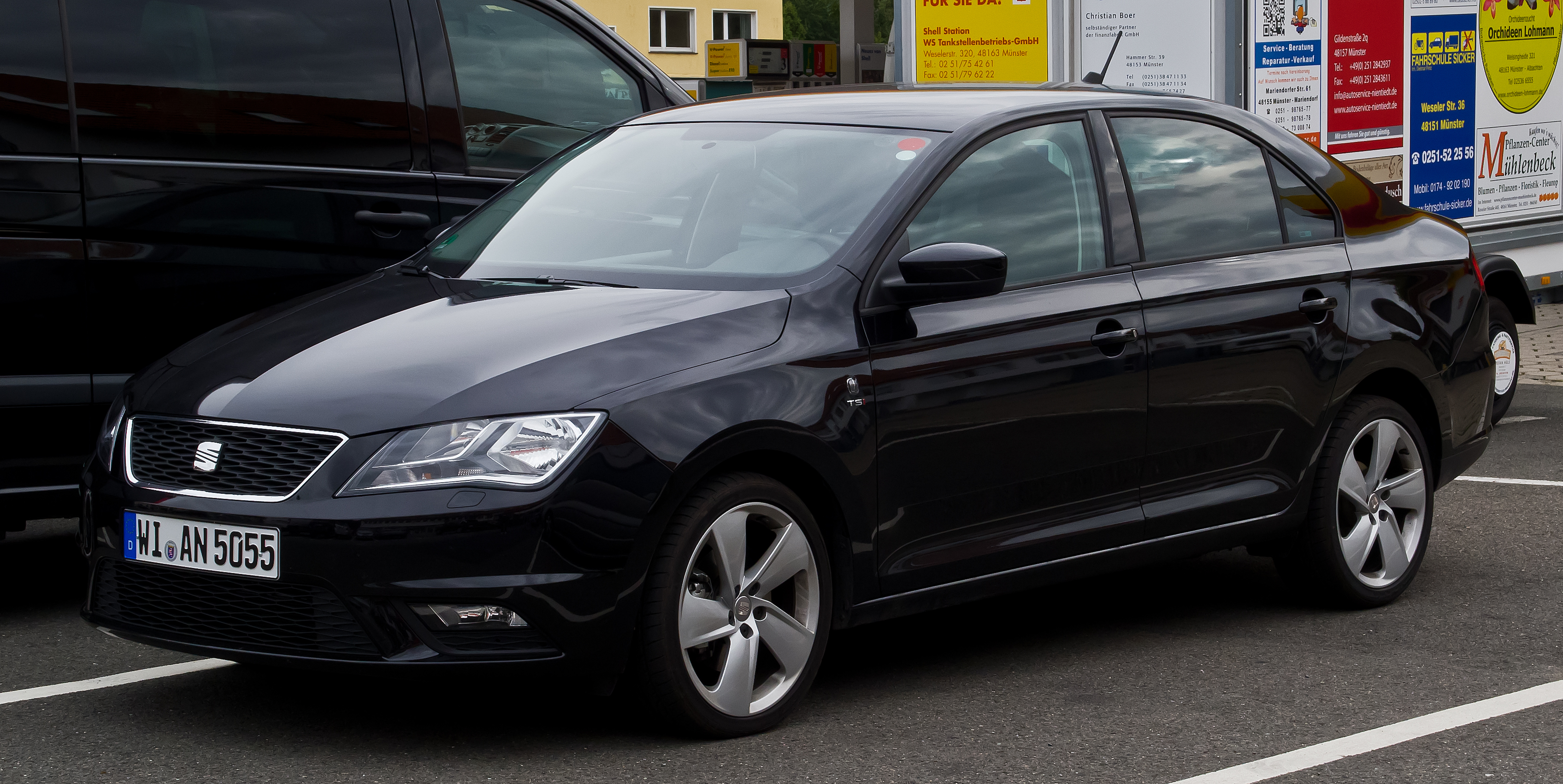
SEAT Toledo Mk4

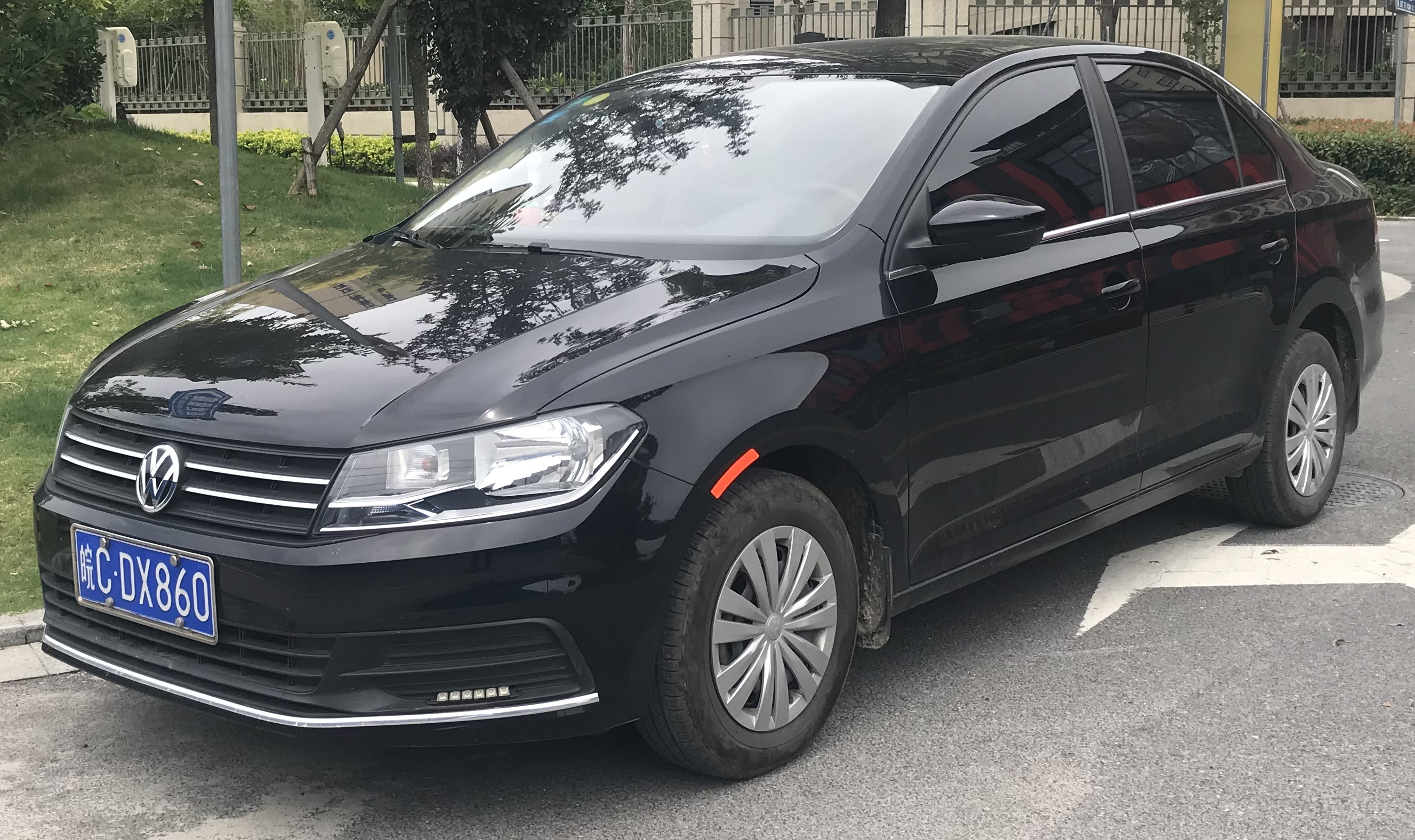
Volkswagen Santana

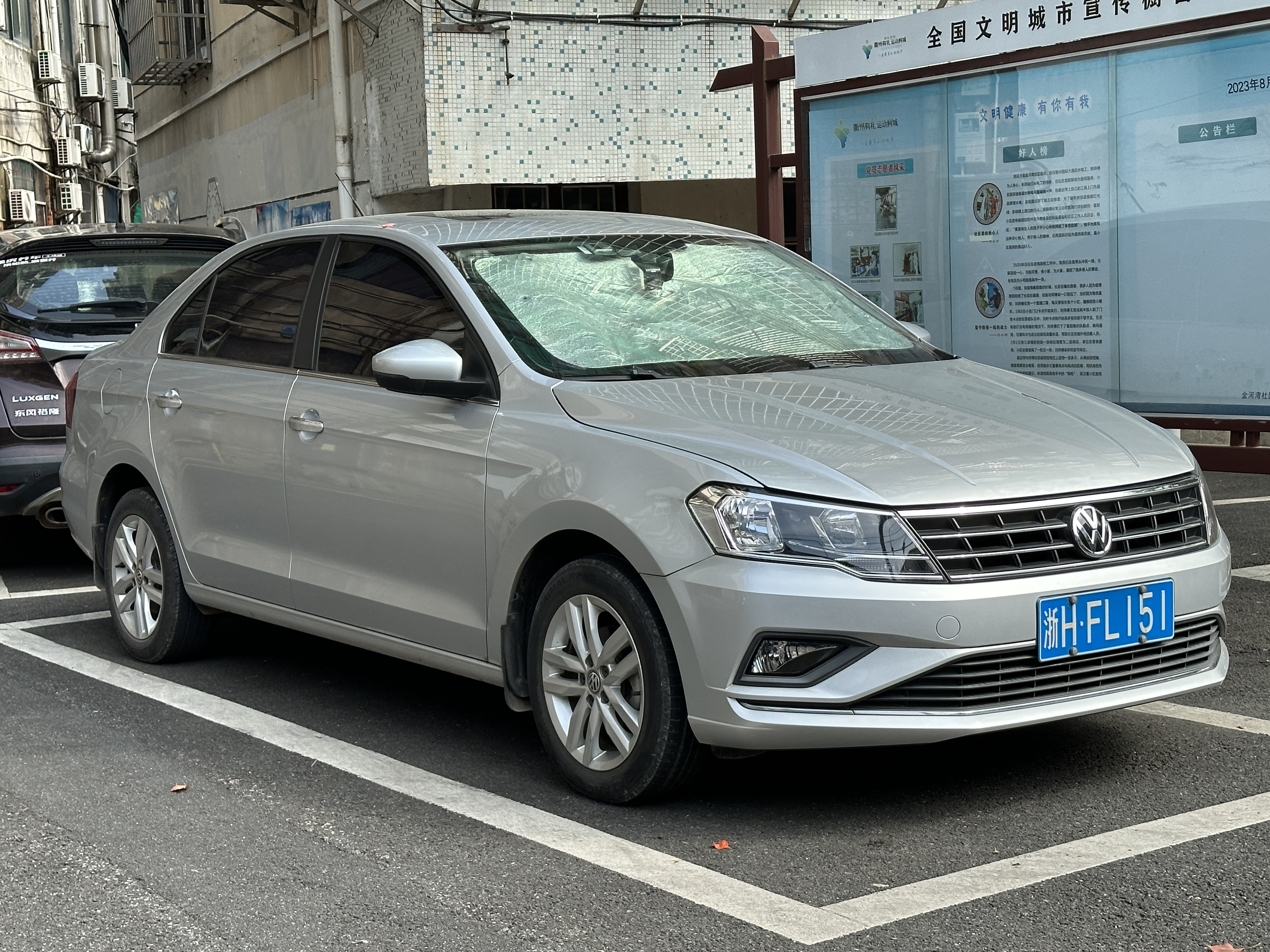
Volkswagen Jetta

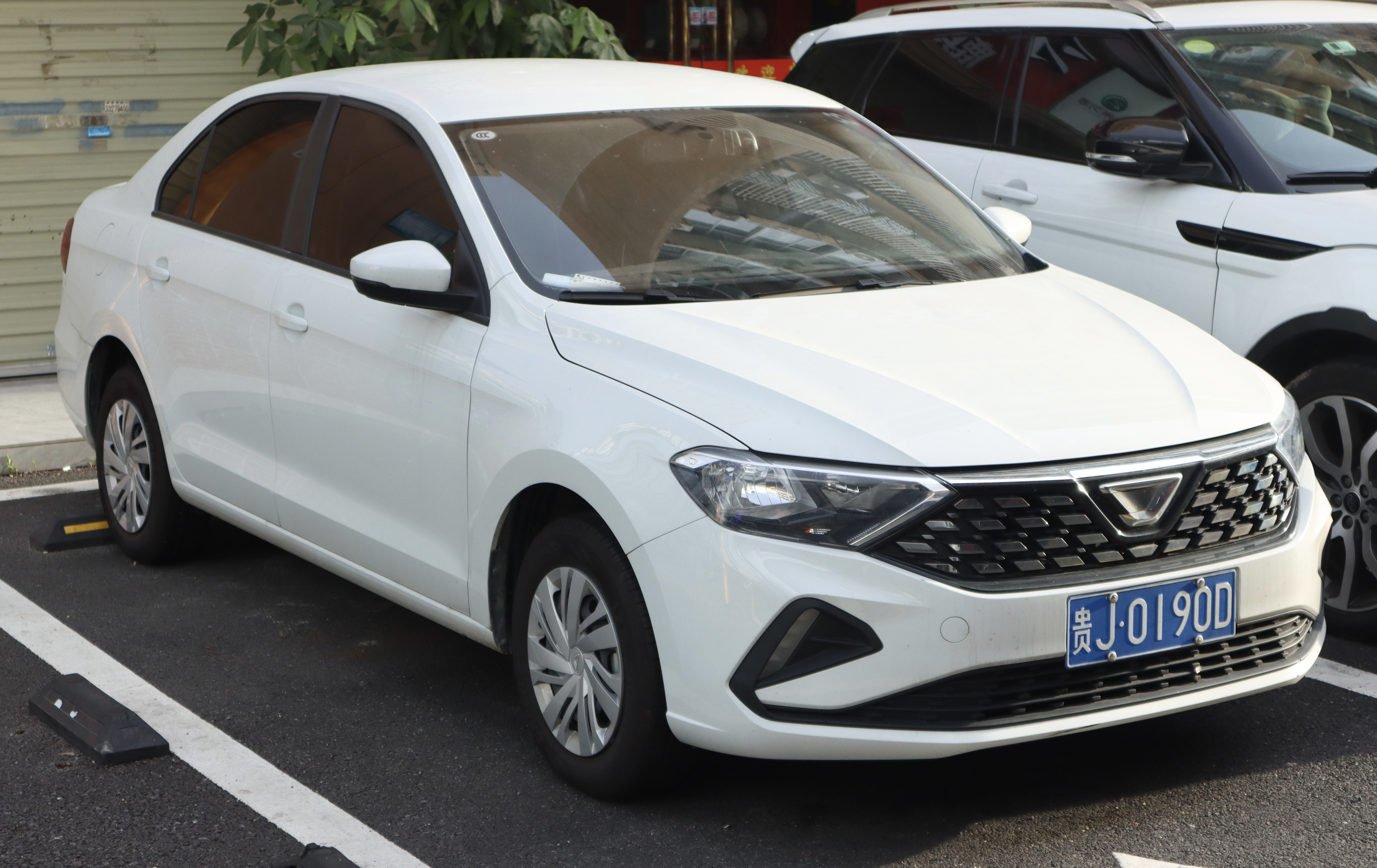
Jetta VA3

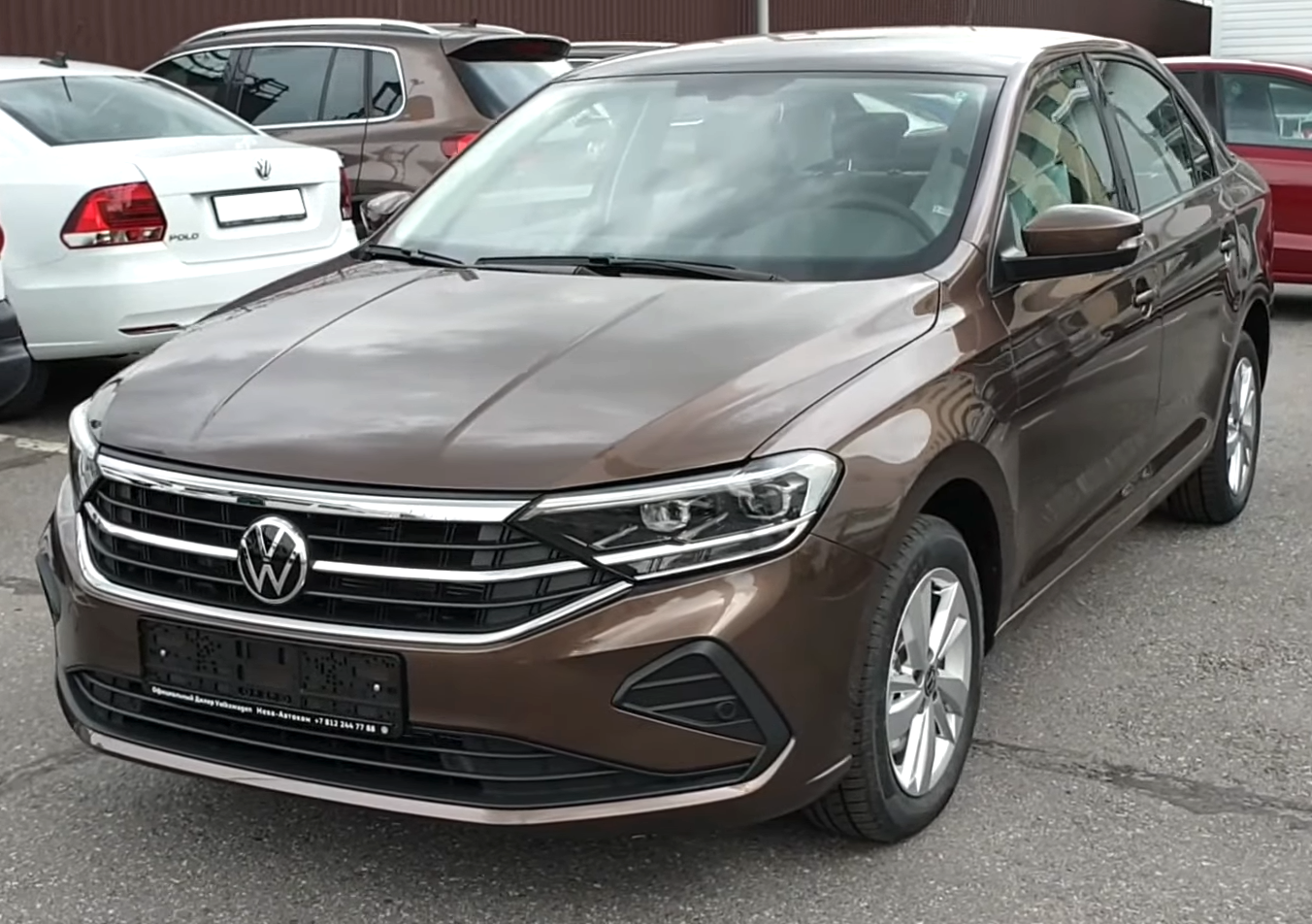
Volkswagen Polo

== A06 (PQ26) ==
- Volkswagen Polo Mk5 Facelift (Typ 6C, 2014–2017)
- Škoda Fabia Mk3 (Typ NJ, 2014–2022)
- Škoda Rapid (MY2015–2023)
- SEAT Ibiza Mk4 Facelift (Typ 6P, 2015–2017)
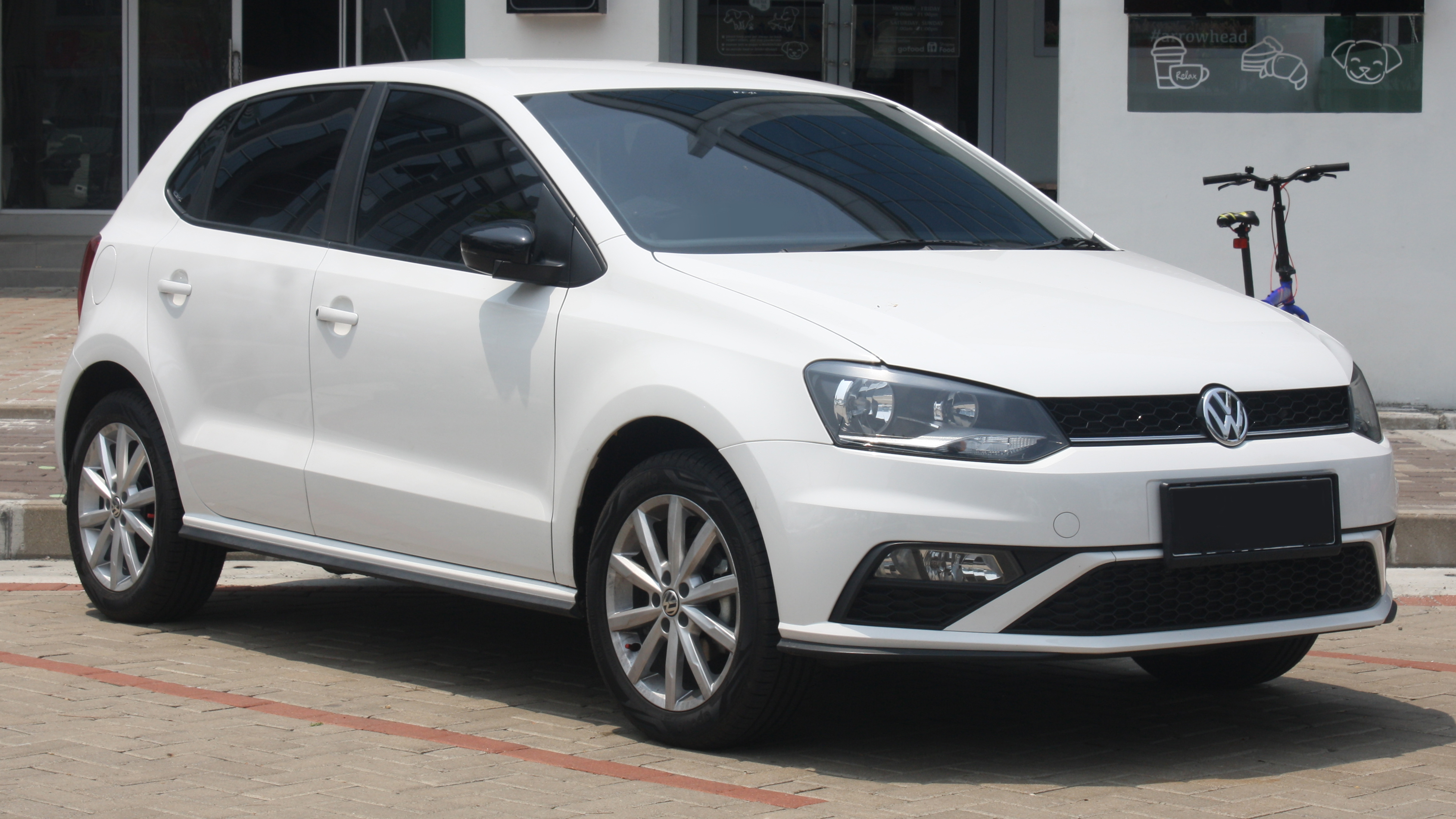
Volkswagen Polo Mk5 Facelift

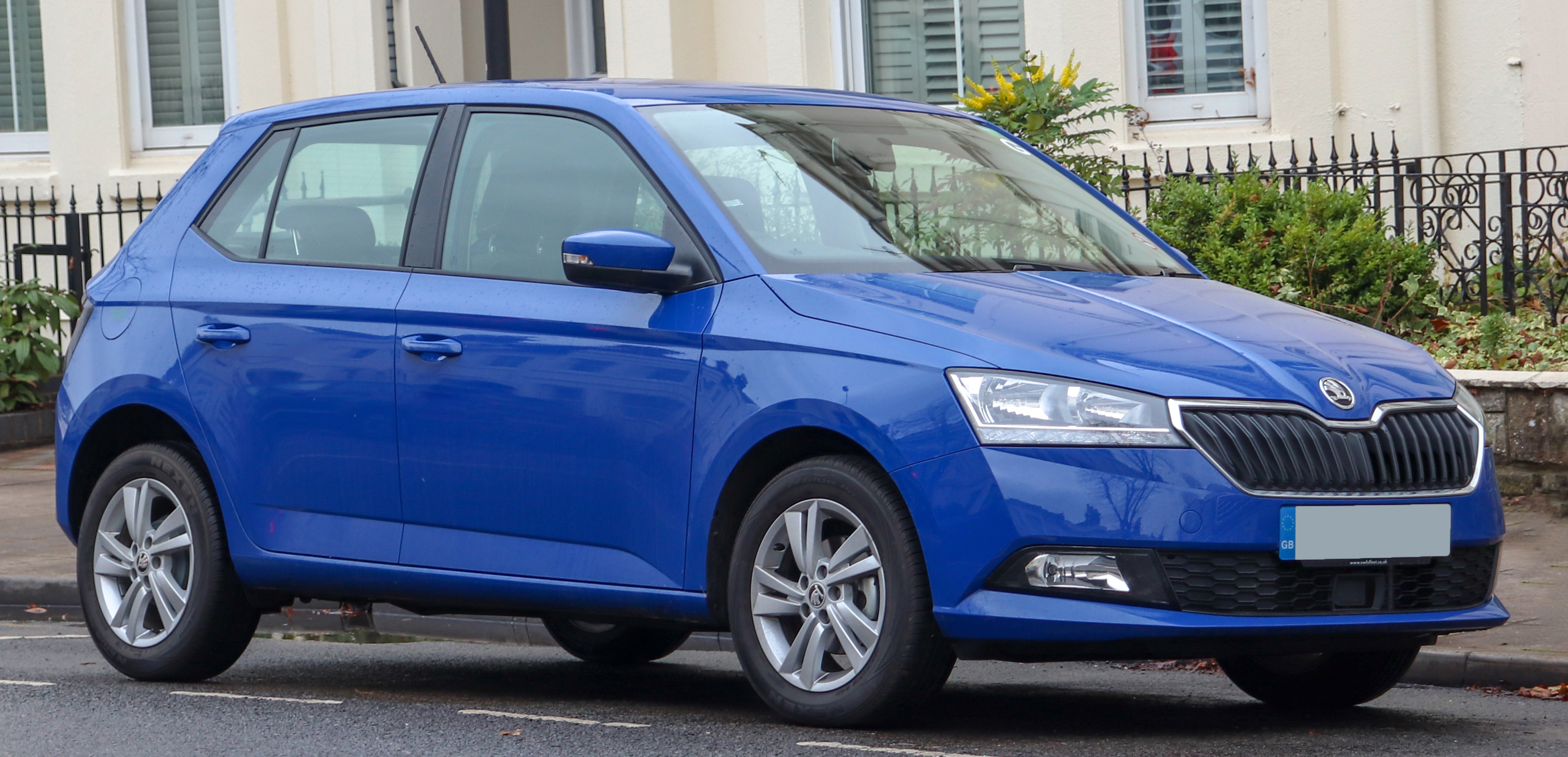
Škoda Fabia Mk3

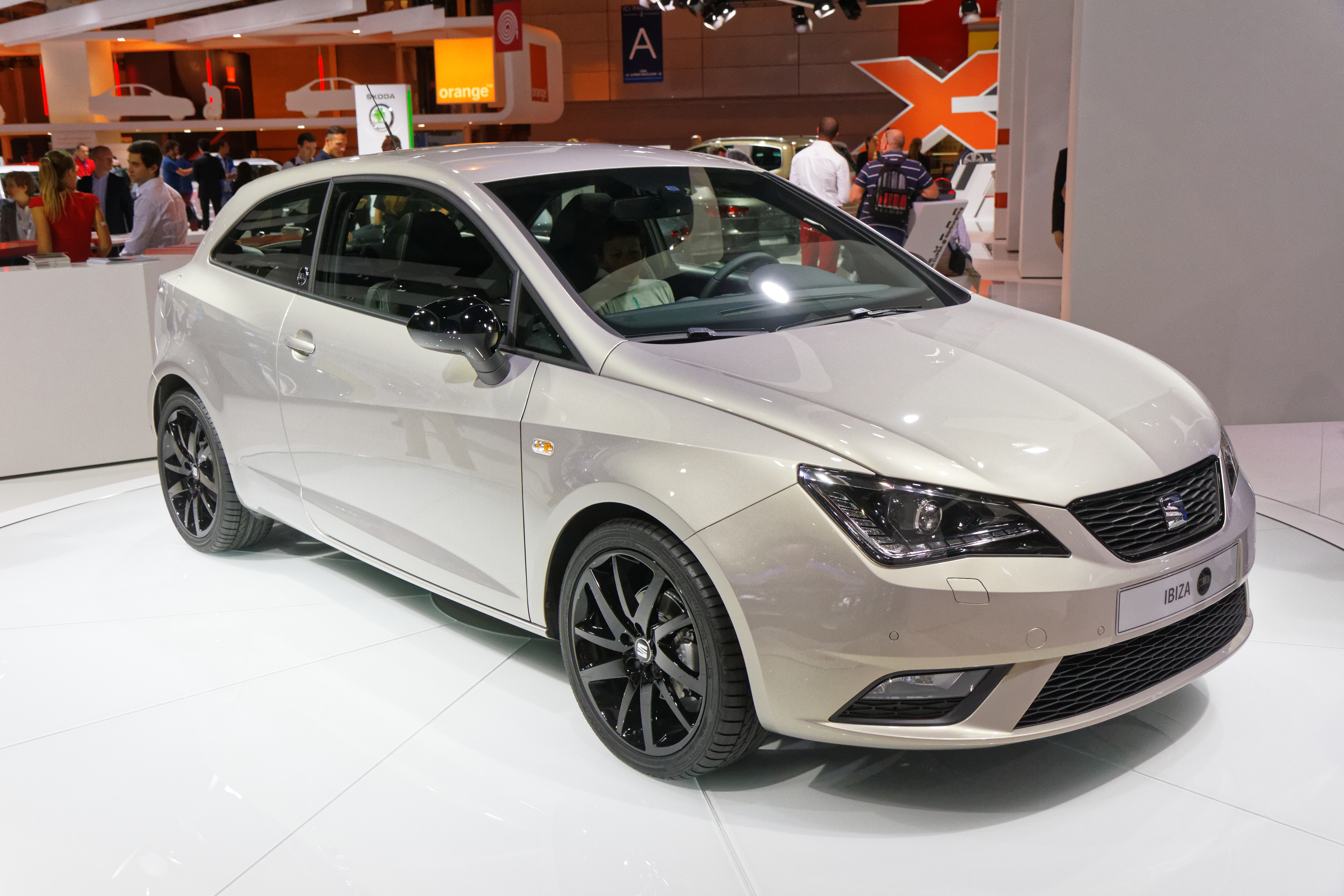
SEAT Ibiza Mk4 Facelift

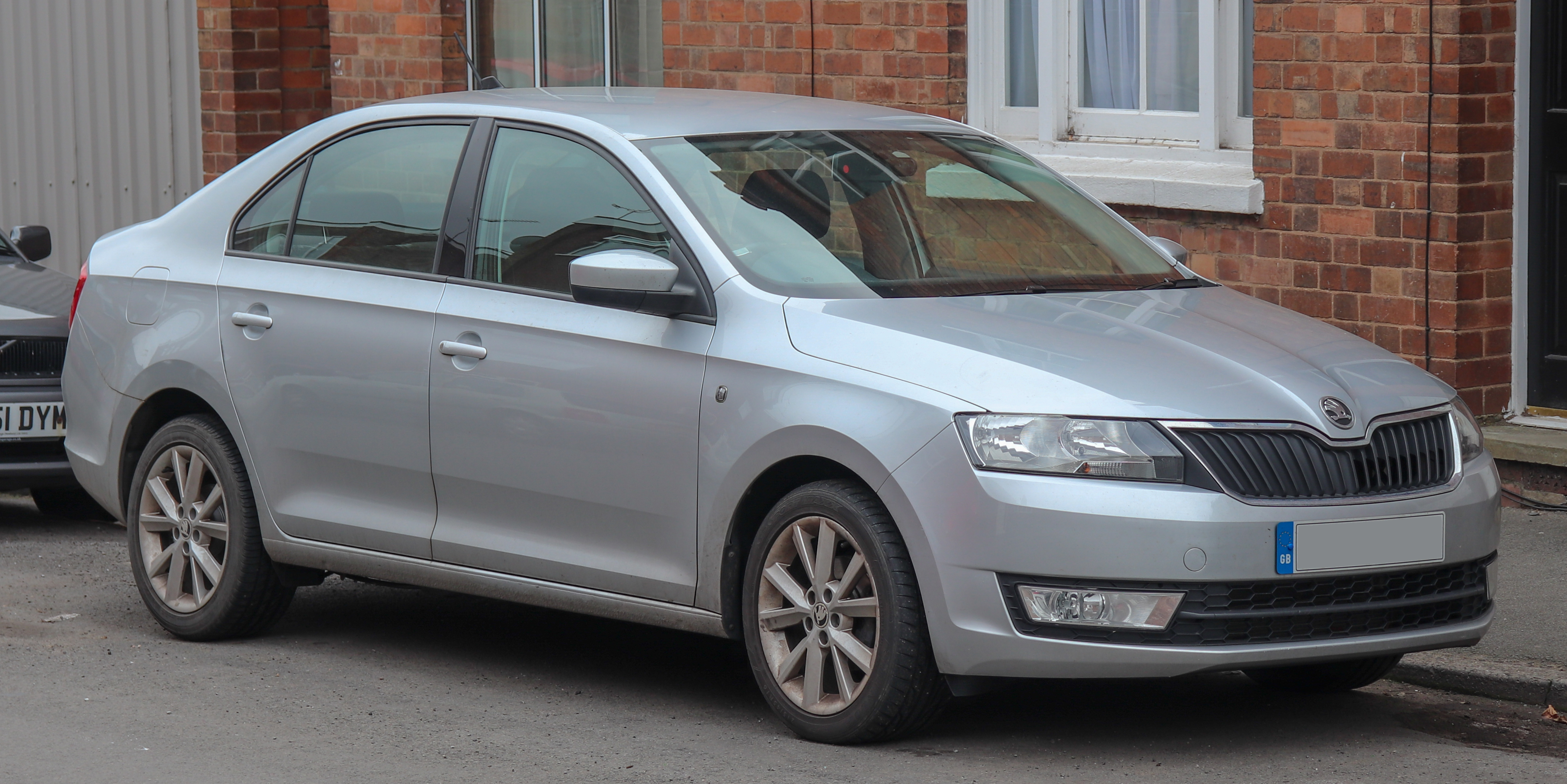
Skoda Rapid (2012)
