= Volkswagen Polo Playa =

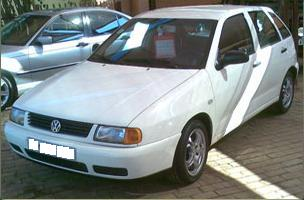

Overview
- Manufacturer: Volkswagen South Africa
- Also called: Volkswagen Polo Classic (sedan)
- Production: 1996–2002
- Assembly: South Africa: Uitenhage

Body and chassis
- Class: Supermini
- Body style: 5-door hatchback (Polo Playa); 4-door sedan (Polo Classic)
- Layout: Front-engine, front-wheel-drive
- Platform: Volkswagen Group A03
- Related: SEAT Ibiza Mk2; SEAT Córdoba Mk1

Powertrain
- Engine: petrol: 1.4 L I4; 1.6 L I4; 1.8 L I4
- Power output: 62 kW (83 hp; 84 PS) (1.4i) 74 kW (99 hp; 101 PS) (1.6i) 86 kW (115 hp; 117 PS) (1.8i)
- Transmission: 5-speed manual

Chronology
- Successor: Polo Mk4

The Volkswagen Polo Playa is a supermini produced and sold in South Africa from 1996 until 2002. It was a rebadged version of the SEAT Ibiza Mk2 five-door hatchback. A separate model, the Polo Mk3, was sold in most markets during this period - this model shared its mechanical components with the Ibiza and Playa, but in hatchback form, the body panels were all different. The Polo Playa and its sedan equivalent, the Polo Classic, were the first generation of the Polo to be sold in South Africa. The Polo Classic was likewise based on the SEAT Córdoba Mk1 four-door sedan, and was also sold in Europe and Latin America in addition to South Africa. In 2002, it was replaced by the Polo Mk4, although the Polo Playa name was still used in South Africa for the Polo hatchback until 2006. There were three models, 1.4i, 1.6i and 1.8i, all of which were available with a 5-speed manual gearbox only.

The name "playa" means beach in Spanish, which alludes to the fact that it's based on the Spanish SEAT Ibiza.

== See also ==
- Volkswagen Polo for an overview of all Polo models
- Volkswagen Polo Mk3 - The European market car which was concurrently sold with the Playa.
