= Kabanov =

Kabanov is a surname. Notable people with the surname include:

- Aleksandr Kabanov (water polo) (1948–2020), Russian water polo player and head coach of Russian water polo team
- Andrey Kabanov (born 1971), Russian sprint canoeist
- Andrey Kabanov (bandy player) (born 1979), Belarusian bandy player
- Artyom Kabanov (born 1984), Russian professional footballer
- Dmitri Aleksandrovich Kabanov (born 1985), Russian professional football player
- Dmitri Kabanov (judoka) (born 1980), Russian judoka
- Ivan Kabanov (painter) (1823-1869), Russian painter
- Ivan Kabanov (politician) (1898-1972), Soviet politician
- Kirill Kabanov (born 1992), Russian junior ice hockey forward
- Konstantin Kabanov (1922–1979), Soviet Air Force officer and Hero of the Soviet Union
- Maksim Kabanov (born 1982), Russian footballer
- Mikhail Kabanov (1919–1943), Hero of the Soviet Union
- Oleksandr Kabanov (1973–2026), Ukrainian politician
- Pavel Kabanov (1920–1985), Hero of the Soviet Union
- Sergei Kabanov (born 1986), Russian footballer
- Taras Kabanov (born 1981), Ukrainian forward
- Vasily Kabanov (1908–1945), Red Army Major and Hero of the Soviet Union
- Vladimir Kabanov (1918–1977), Soviet Air Force Captain and Hero of the Soviet Union
- Yevgeny Kabanov (1918–1989), Soviet Naval Aviation Major general
- Yuriy Kabanov, Soviet sprint canoeist who competed in the mid to late 1960s

== See also ==
- Cabano
- Kaban (disambiguation)
- Kabani (disambiguation)
- Kabanos
- Shabanov
