= Ivan Kabanov =

Ivan Kabanov may refer to:

- Ivan Kabanov (painter)
- Ivan Kabanov (politician)
