= Volkswagen Polo Mk3 =

Volkswagen Polo Mk3 (6N/6KV)
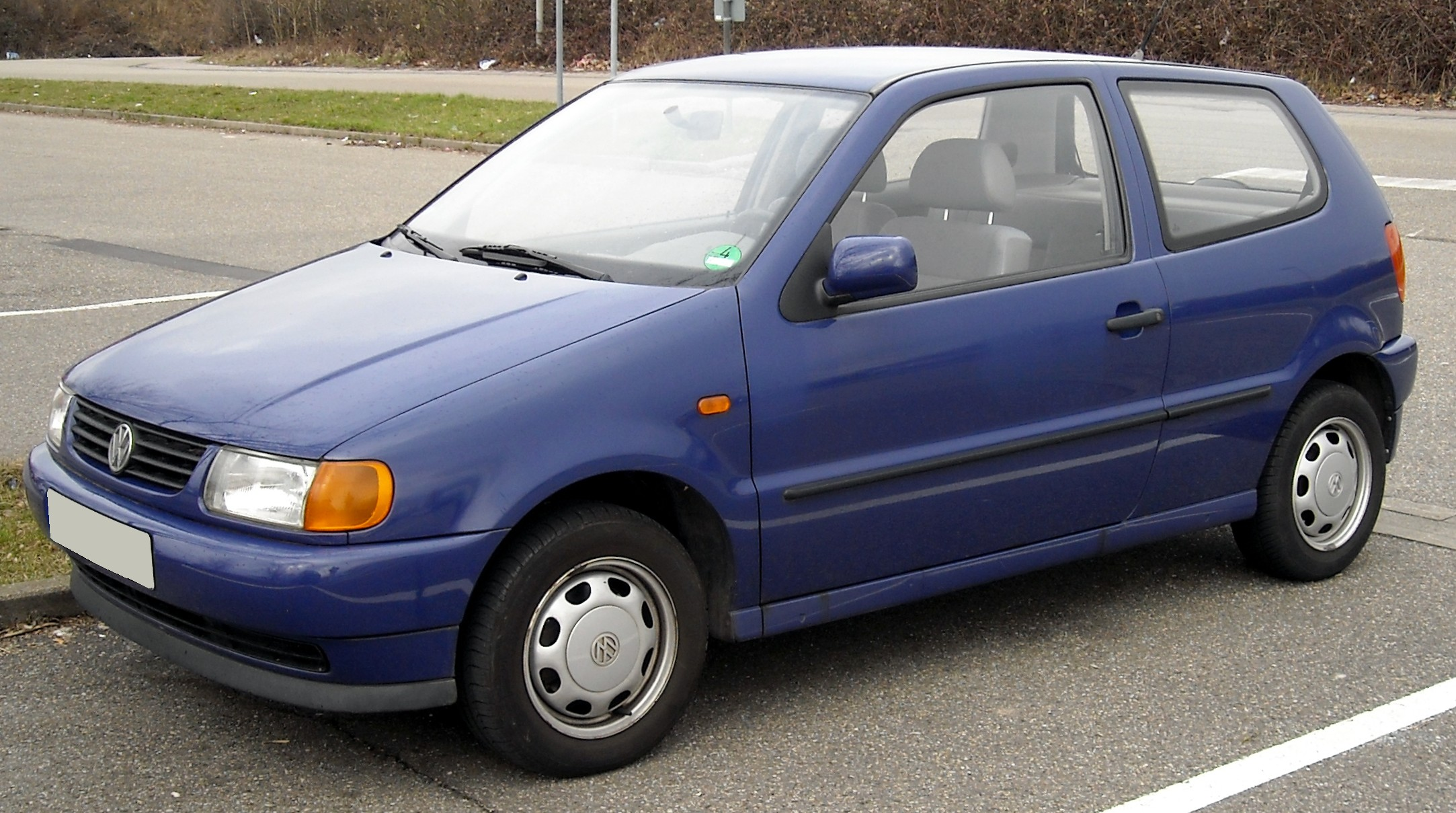

Overview
- Manufacturer: Volkswagen
- Also called: Volkswagen Derby
- Production: August 1994 – October 2001 (Germany); 1997–2009 (Argentina)
- Assembly: Germany: Wolfsburg; Argentina: Pacheco; Poland: Poznań; Slovakia: Bratislava; Spain: Pamplona; Spain: Martorell (Polo Classic and Polo Variant)

Body and chassis
- Class: Supermini (B)
- Body style: 5-door hatchback 3-door hatchback 4-door saloon (Polo Classic); 5-door estate (Polo Variant)
- Layout: Front-engine, front-wheel-drive
- Platform: Volkswagen Group A03 platform
- Related: SEAT Arosa; SEAT Ibiza Mk2; SEAT Córdoba Mk1; SEAT Inca; Volkswagen Lupo; Volkswagen Caddy Mk2

Powertrain
- Engine: Petrol: 1.0 L I4; 1.3 L I4; 1.4 L I4 8V; 1.4 L I4 16V; 1.6 L I4 8V; 1.6 L I4 16V; 1.8 L I4 8V; Diesel: 1.4 L I3 TDI; 1.7 L I4 SDI; 1.9 L I4 D; 1.9 L I4 SDI; 1.9 L I4 TDI
- Transmission: 5-speed manual 4-speed automatic

Dimensions
- Wheelbase: 2,407 mm (94.8 in) (hatchback); 2,444 mm (96.2 in) (saloon, estate)
- Length: 3,715–3,743 mm (146.3–147.4 in) (hb.); 4,138 mm (162.9 in) (saloon, estate)
- Width: 1,632–1,655 mm (64.3–65.2 in) (hb.); 1,640 mm (64.6 in) (saloon, estate)

Chronology
- Predecessor: Volkswagen Polo Mk2
- Successor: Volkswagen Polo Mk4

The Volkswagen Polo Mk3 (Typ 6N/6KV) is the third generation of the Volkswagen Polo supermini car and was produced from 1994 until 2001, with a facelift at the end of 1999. It was available in hatchback, sedan and wagon body styles. Although the Polo Mk3 hatchback did not share the same platform as the Seat Ibiza, saloon and estate models were rebadged as Seat Córdoba.

The hatchback underwent a major facelift for the 2000 model year, while the saloon and the estate received only minor refinements. It now had a more different exterior and interior design than the also facelifted Seat Ibiza. At the end of 2001, it was discontinued and replaced by its successor, the Volkswagen Polo Mk4, but it continued production in Argentina, where the saloon was facelifted in 2004, receiving the exterior design applied to the facelifted Seat Córdoba and the interior of the facelifted Volkswagen Polo.

== Overview ==
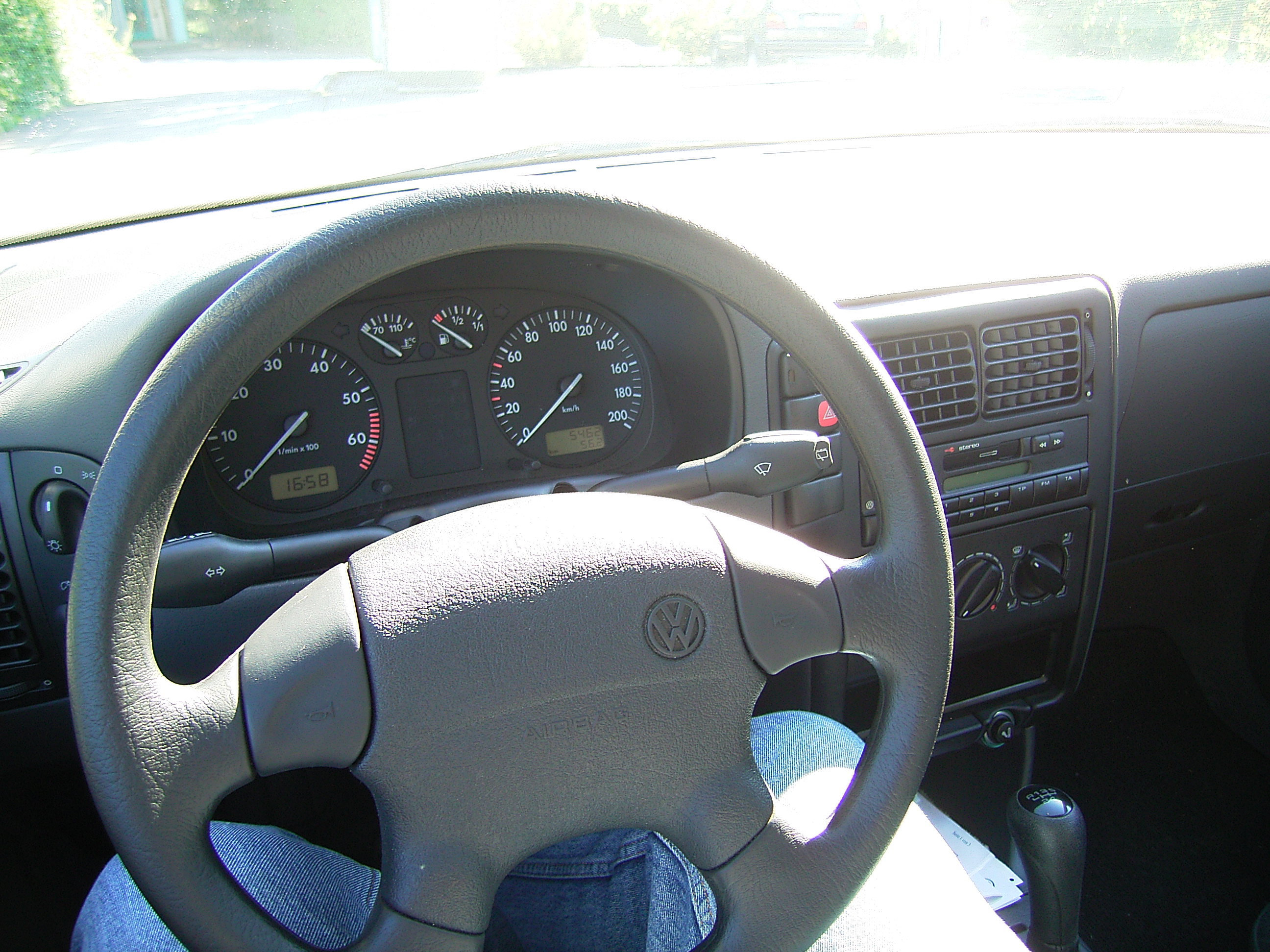
Interior (pre-facelift)

The MK3 Polo was unveiled on 31 August 1994, and was immediately available in left-hand drive form for continental markets, and was launched on the right-hand drive UK market in October that year. It was the first completely new Polo to be launched since the MK2 model in 1981; although that model had undergone a major restyle in 1990. It was also the first version of the Polo to be available with five doors as well as three doors. The initial range consisted of new 1.0 and 1.6 petrol engines; the 1.3 unit was carried over from the previous Polo but discontinued a year later in favour a new 1.4 unit, which became available around the same time as a 1.9 diesel and turbo-diesel models. The availability of a diesel Polo for the first time on the UK market brought it into line with almost all of its competitors, while the Polo was the last mainstream supermini in Europe to become available with five doors - five years after the Ford Fiesta was first available with five doors, and between seven and 11 years after the launch of five-door superminis including the Opel Corsa, Fiat Uno, Nissan Micra and Peugeot 205.

The platform used for this model was all new, although it shared some components with SEAT Ibiza Mk2 which had been launched a year earlier. Although the dashboard and a number of mechanical components, including some engines and rear suspension, were shared with the Ibiza, outwardly the Polo models were entirely different with no body panels shared with the SEAT model.

Initially, only three- and five-door hatchback versions were available. In 1995, four-door saloon ("Polo Classic/Sedan/Derby/Flight") and five-door estate ("Polo Wagon/Variant") versions were added to the range — these were badge engineered and mildly restyled versions of the SEAT Córdoba (the saloon and estate versions of the Ibiza). They were referred to internally by VW as the Typ 6KV, and shared body panels with the SEAT model rather than the hatchback models. A two-door coupe version of the Cordoba (the SX) was also produced, but the Polo was never made in this form.

A convertible version was not produced, although a version with an electrically sliding full length sunroof, called the Polo Open Air, was available.

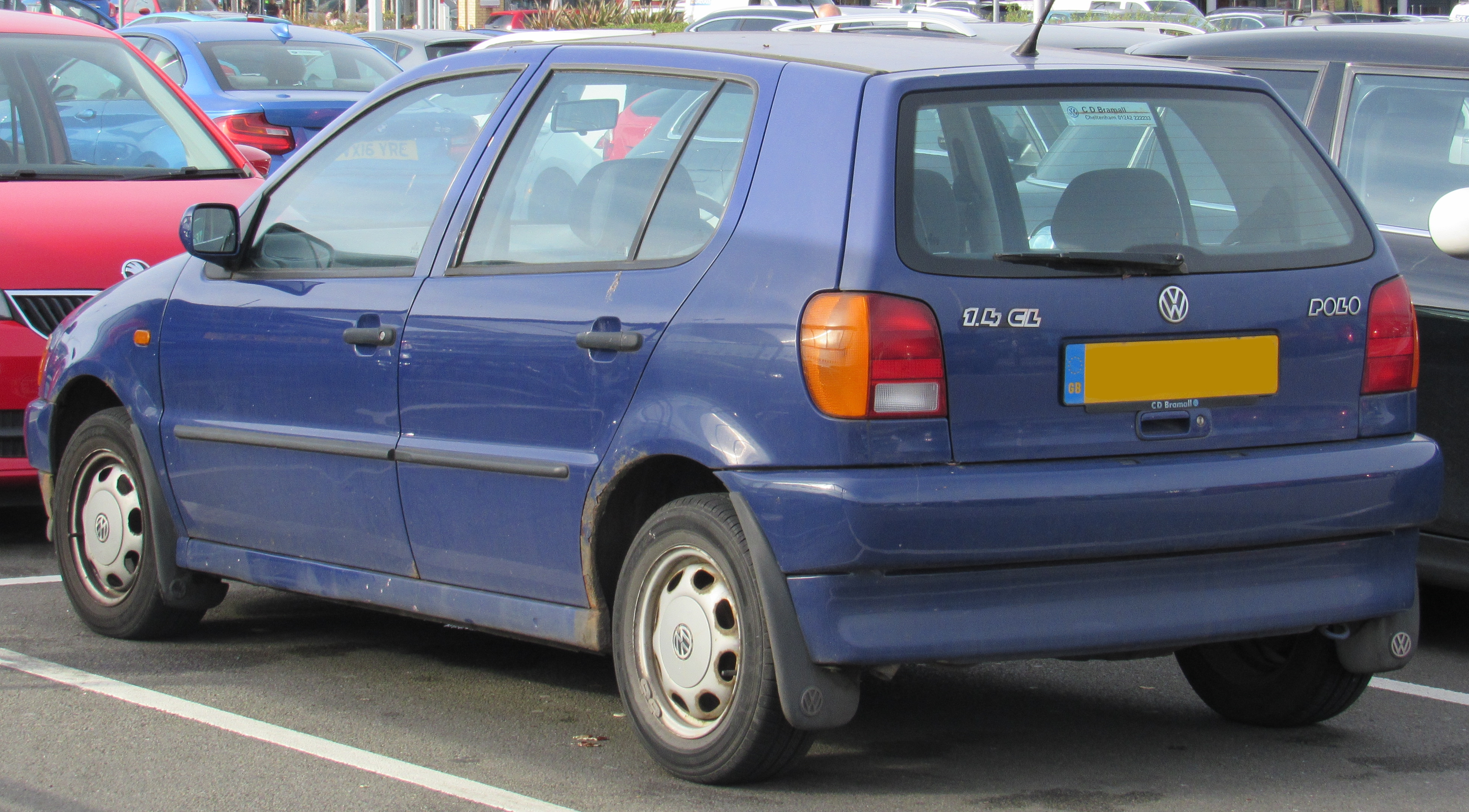
Polo hatchback

Polo Variant

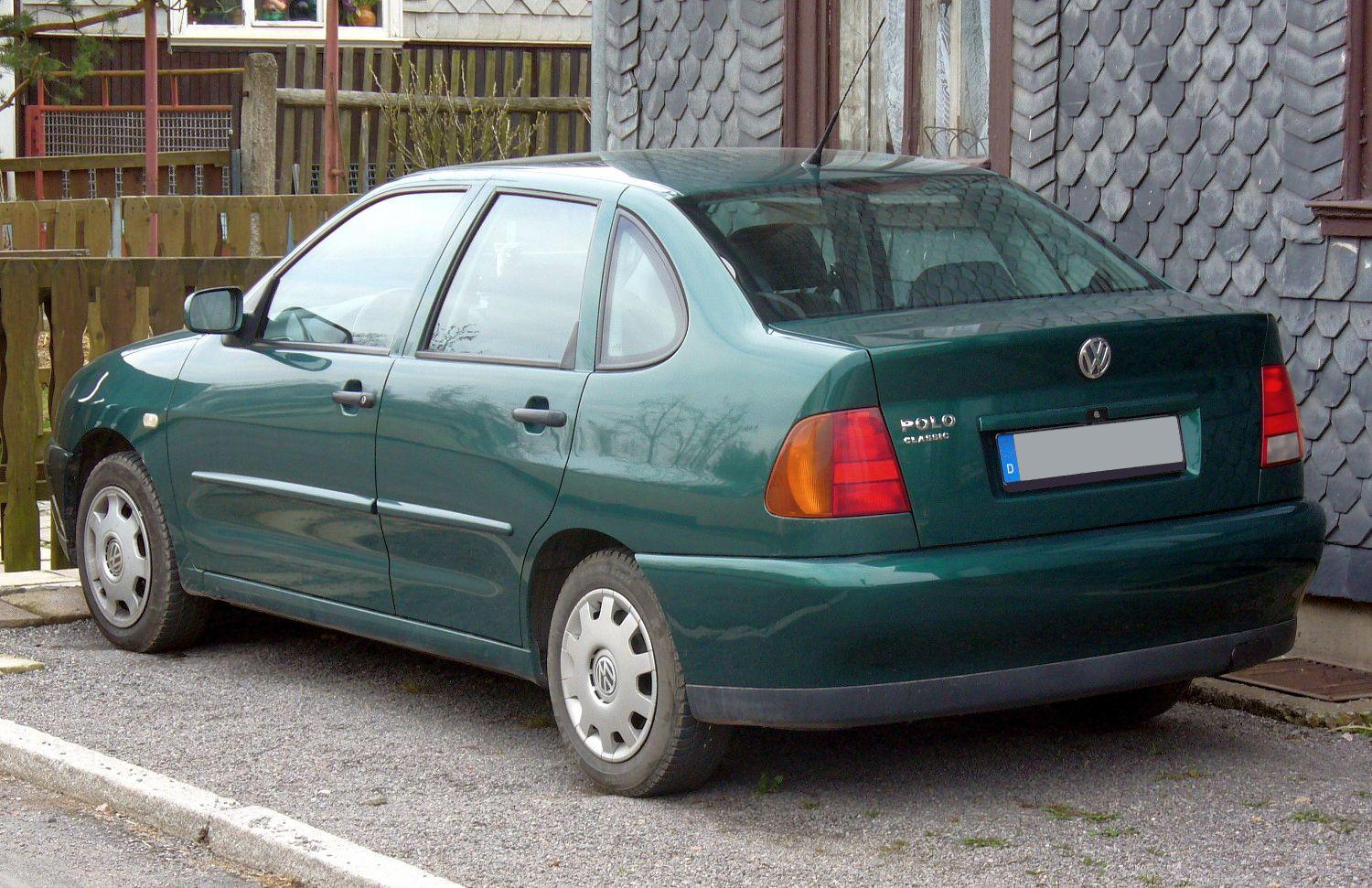
Polo Classic

== Engines ==
Initially the car was available with the 1043cc putting out 45 PS (33 kW; 44 hp), and the 1272cc putting out 55 PS (40 kW; 54 hp) engines from the previous generation Polo, along with a new 1598cc unit. A new 1.4L engine replaced the 1.3L in October 1995. In September 1996 the 1043cc engine was replaced by an all-new aluminum block multi-point injection 999cc developing 50 PS (37 kW; 49 hp). The Classic and Variant models featured a 75 PS (55 kW; 74 hp) or 100 PS (74 kW; 99 hp) 1.6L and a 64 PS (47 kW; 63 hp) 1.9L diesel and a 1.8L (82 kW) lux model with electric front windows and electric mirrors. For the first time, a turbo-diesel engine (1.9L) was available in a Polo, although only in the 6K models. Due to its smaller engine bay, the standard 3 and 5-door 6N did not get a turbo-diesel engine until the facelift in 2000.

The car was available with the following engines:

Model	Years	Engine and code		Displacement	Power	Torque	Body Type		
Model	Years	Engine and code		Displacement	Power	Torque	Hatchback	Saloon	Estate
Petrol
1.0	1996-1999	I4 SOHC	AER	999 cc (61.0 cu in)	37 kW (50 PS; 50 hp) at 5,000 rpm	86 N⋅m (63 lb⋅ft) at 3,000 rpm	✔		
1.0	2000-2001	I4 SOHC	ALD/ANV/AUC	999 cc (61.0 cu in)	37 kW (50 PS; 50 hp) at 5,000 rpm	86 N⋅m (63 lb⋅ft) at 3,000 rpm	✔		
1.05	1994-1996	I4 SOHC	AEV	1,043 cc (63.6 cu in)	33 kW (45 PS; 44 hp) at 5,200 rpm	76 N⋅m (56 lb⋅ft) at 2,800 rpm	✔		
1.3	1994-1995	I4 SOHC	ADX	1,298 cc (79.2 cu in)	40 kW (54 PS; 54 hp) at 5,200 rpm	100 N⋅m (74 lb⋅ft) at 2,800 rpm	✔		
1.4 8v	1995-1999	I4 SOHC	AEX/AKV/APQ	1,390 cc (85 cu in)	44 kW (60 PS; 59 hp) at 4,700 rpm	106 N⋅m (78 lb⋅ft) at 2,800 rpm		✔	
1.4 16v	2000-	I4 DOHC	AHW/AUA/APE	1,390 cc (85 cu in)	55 kW (75 PS; 74 hp) at 4,500 rpm	128 N⋅m (94 lb⋅ft)		✔	
1.4 16v	1997-2002	I4 DOHC	AFH	1,390 cc (85 cu in)	74 kW (101 PS; 99 hp) at 6,000 rpm	126 N⋅m (93 lb⋅ft) at 4,400 rpm	✔		
1.6 8v	1995-1999	I4 SOHC	AEE	1,598 cc (97.5 cu in)	55 kW (75 PS; 74 hp) at 4,500 rpm	137 N⋅m (101 lb⋅ft) at 3,500 rpm		✔	✔
1.6 8v	1995-1999	I4 SOHC	AFT	1,595 cc (97.3 cu in)	74 kW (101 PS; 99 hp) at 5,800 rpm	140 N⋅m (103 lb⋅ft) at 3,500 rpm		✔	✔
1.6 8v	1999-2001	I4 SOHC	AEH/AKL	1,595 cc (97.3 cu in)	74 kW (101 PS; 99 hp) at 5,600 rpm	145 N⋅m (107 lb⋅ft) at 3,800 rpm		✔	✔
1.6 8v	2000	I4 SOHC	APF	1,595 cc (97.3 cu in)	74 kW (101 PS; 99 hp) at 5,600 rpm	145 N⋅m (107 lb⋅ft) at 3,800 rpm		✔	✔
1.6 8v	1999-2001	I4 SOHC	AUR	1,595 cc (97.3 cu in)	74 kW (101 PS; 99 hp) at 5,600 rpm	145 N⋅m (107 lb⋅ft) at 3,800 rpm		✔	✔
1.6 16v GTI	1998-1999	I4 DOHC	AJV	1,598 cc (97.5 cu in)	88 kW (120 PS; 118 hp) at 6,200 rpm	150 N⋅m (111 lb⋅ft) at 4,000 rpm	GTI		
1.6 16v GTI	2000-2002	I4 DOHC	ARC/AVY	1,598 cc (97.5 cu in)	92 kW (125 PS; 123 hp) at 6,500 rpm	152 N⋅m (112 lb⋅ft) at 3,000 rpm	GTI		
1.8 8v	1997-2000	I4 SOHC	ADD/ADZ	1,781 cc (108.7 cu in)	66 kW (90 PS; 89 hp) at 5,500 rpm	145 N⋅m (107 lb⋅ft) at 2,500 rpm		✔	
Diesel
1.4 TDI	1999-2001	I3 SOHC	AMF	1,422 cc (86.8 cu in)	55 kW (75 PS; 74 hp) at 4,000 rpm	195 N⋅m (144 lb⋅ft) at 1,900 rpm	✔		
1.7 SDI	1997-2002	I4 SOHC	AKU	1,716 cc (104.7 cu in)	44 kW (60 PS; 59 hp) at 4,200 rpm	115 N⋅m (85 lb⋅ft) at 2,200 rpm	✔	✔	✔
1.9 SDI	1995-1999	I4 SOHC	AEF/AGD/ASX	1,896 cc (115.7 cu in)	48 kW (65 PS; 64 hp) at 4,200 rpm	124 N⋅m (91 lb⋅ft) at 2,200 rpm		✔	
1.9 SDI	1999-2002	I4 SOHC	AGP/AQM	1,896 cc (115.7 cu in)	50 kW (68 PS; 67 hp) at 4,000 rpm	133 N⋅m (98 lb⋅ft) at 1,800 rpm		✔	✔
1.9 SDI	1994-2002	I4 SOHC	AEY	1,896 cc (115.7 cu in)	44 kW (60 PS; 59 hp) at 3,600 rpm	130 N⋅m (96 lb⋅ft) at 2,200 rpm	✔		
1.9 TDI	1997-1999	I4 SOHC	AHU	1,896 cc (115.7 cu in)	66 kW (90 PS; 89 hp) at 4,000 rpm	202 N⋅m (149 lb⋅ft) at 1,900 rpm		✔	✔
1.9 TDI	1997-1999	I4 SOHC	ALE	1,896 cc (115.7 cu in)	66 kW (90 PS; 89 hp) at 4,000 rpm	210 N⋅m (155 lb⋅ft) at 1,900 rpm		✔	✔
1.9 TDI	1999-2001	I4 SOHC	AGR	1,896 cc (115.7 cu in)	66 kW (90 PS; 89 hp) at 4,000 rpm	210 N⋅m (155 lb⋅ft) at 1,900 rpm		✔	
1.9 TDI	1999-2001	I4 SOHC	ALH	1,896 cc (115.7 cu in)	66 kW (90 PS; 89 hp) at 4,000 rpm	210 N⋅m (155 lb⋅ft) at 1,900 rpm		✔	
1.9 TDI	1998-1999	I4 SOHC	AFN	1,896 cc (115.7 cu in)	81 kW (110 PS; 109 hp) at 4,150 rpm	235 N⋅m (173 lb⋅ft) at 1,900 rpm		✔	✔
1.9 TDI	1999-2001	I4 SOHC	ASV	1,896 cc (115.7 cu in)	81 kW (110 PS; 109 hp) at 4,150 rpm	235 N⋅m (173 lb⋅ft) at 1,900 rpm		✔	

== Trim levels ==
The Polo Mark 3 was much better equipped than its predecessor. A range of models featured items such as colour-coded bumpers, heated/electrically adjustable mirrors, four speaker stereo, pollen filters, central locking, rear head restraints, split rear seats, fog lights, alloy wheels, and airbags. The car was available originally in four trim levels ranging from the L at the bottom level of the scale through the CL and GL to the range-topping GLX model. Later on, the Polo SE or Special Equipment launched; it featured a number of features from higher spec models such as the GLX bumpers, Sport Rader alloy wheels, tinted rear light clusters and clear indicators.

Unlike the Volkswagen Polo Mk1 and Volkswagen Polo Mk2, trim levels were not the same across Europe; the United Kingdom's were L, CL, GL, GLX, 16v (later E, S, SE and GTi); models sold in Europe had trim levels which were individual to the country they were marketed in. The facelift at the end of 1999 saw the introduction of E, S and SE trim levels, as well as the 1.6 GTI which was the first to be sold in Britain.

An all-new Polo was unveiled at the end of 2001, although the saloon and estate models continued in production until 2003, and were not replaced with any new additions to the newer Polo range.

== Variants ==
=== Sporting variants ===
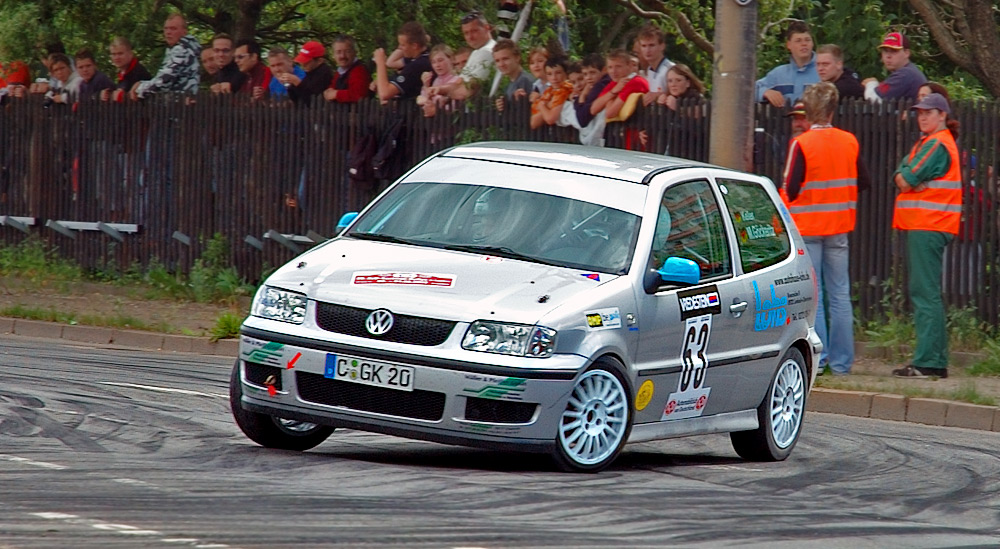
Volkswagen Polo GTI 16V at the German Saxony Rally

Sporting variants were not introduced initially, and a supercharged G40 version of the Mark 3 was never made, but a GTI model introduced in 1998 catered for the hot hatch market. With a limited production run of 3000 units, the 6N GTI was available only in continental Europe. Featuring a 1.6 16V 120 PS (88 kW) version of the unit that would later be found in the Mark 3F model, the car came with 15" BBS alloys and could accelerate to 100 km/h (62 mph) in 9.1 seconds. The 16V, introduced to replace the GLX, was one of the most popular Mark 3 versions with modifiers, it used a 1.4 16V unit pushed to 100 PS (74 kW) as standard. This car was not a pure sporting model, and with a 0–100 km/h time of 10.6 seconds and a 190 km/h (118 mph) top speed, it was not as fast as the sporting Ibiza model (which used a 2.0 L 16V engine). The Polo GTI was often seen as overpriced for the performance it delivered.

=== Polo GTI ===
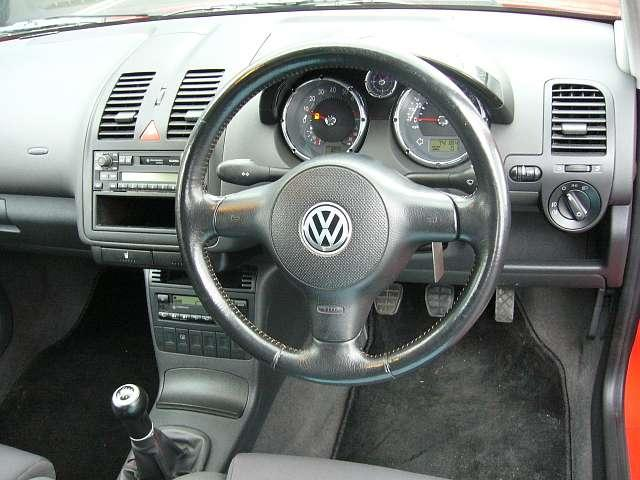
2000 Volkswagen Polo GTI interior

Between 2000 and 2002 VW offered two sporting models, the 16V and GTI. The 16V came with the 1.4 16V 100 PS (74 kW) engine and had options such as 15" Spa alloys and air conditioning. However more interest was in the GTI. Available only in hatchback form, the GTI was powered by a 1.6 16V 125 PS (92 kW) engine with variable valve timing, making it the most powerful Polo to come out the factory to date. External changes gave the car the looks to match its power. Deeper front bumpers with honeycomb mesh inserts, side skirts, fog lights, a honeycomb mesh grille and 15" BBS split rims suited the car well. There were also standard extras such as Climatronic fully automatic air conditioning, Xenon headlights (with a headlight washer system), a 6 disc CD autochanger, exclusive sports interior with leather steering wheel and gearstick, chrome inserts and driver aids such as ABS with EBD and an EDL (a system to aid traction). Leather and satellite navigation were also optional extras. The Mark 3F Polo GTI however missed the new six-speed gearbox that was introduced in the smaller Lupo GTI.

=== Polo Harlekin ===
In Europe, a limited edition "Harlekin" model was released in 1995. The Polo Harlekin featured multi-coloured body panels with a symmetrical combination of Flash Red, Ginster Yellow, Pistachio Green and Chagall Blue. Harlekin Polos used the 1.4l petrol engine and featured special "Joker" pattern seats and bespoke gear knob and steering wheel. Originally limited to 1,000, around 3,800 of this series were produced. 2,500 Polo Harlekins were sold in the UK between 1996 and 1998.

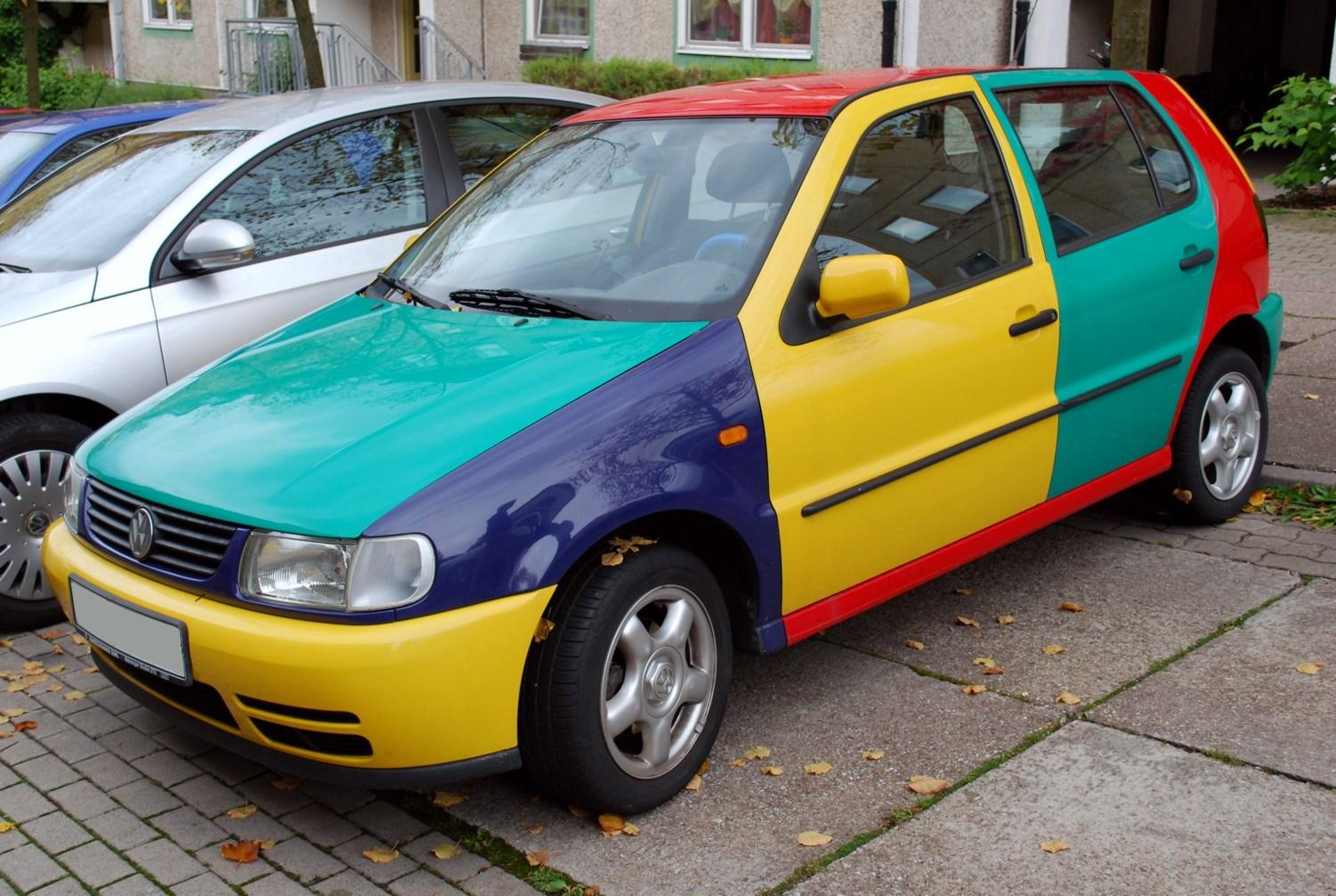
Multicoloured Polo Harlekin

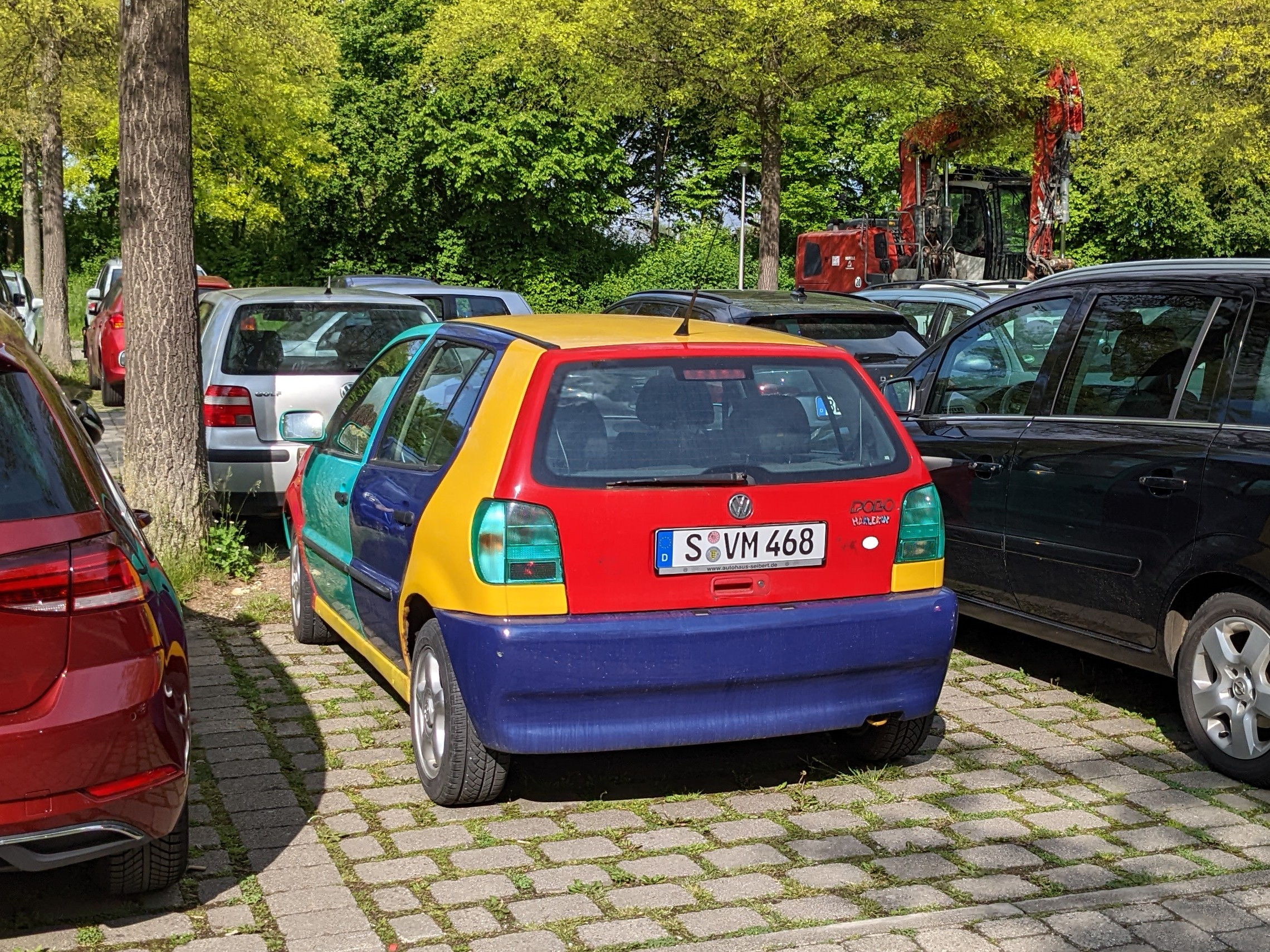
Polo Harlekin in Stuttgart, Germany

== Facelift ==
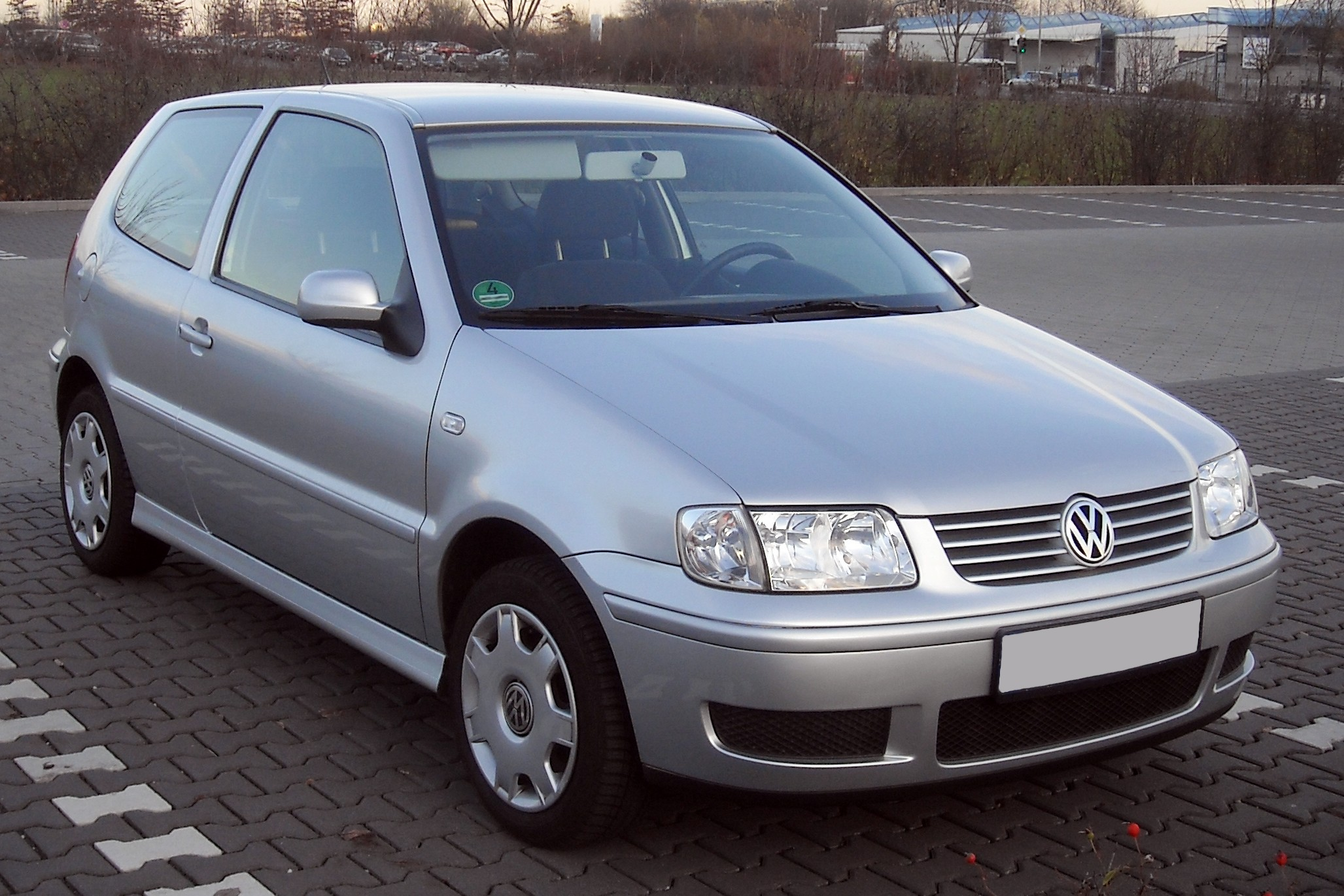

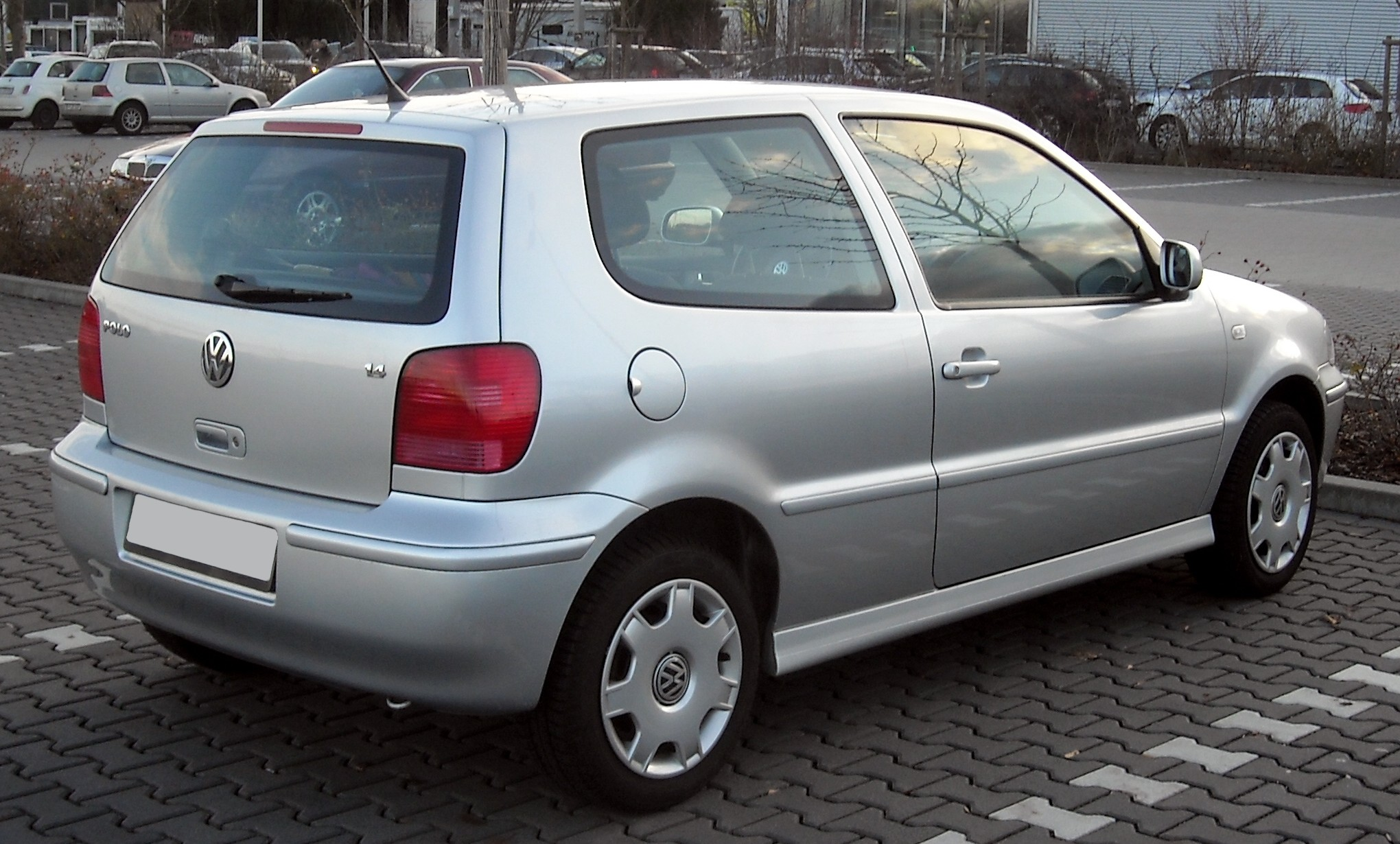
2000 facelift

The facelifted Mark III Phase II (or Typ 6N2; sometimes referred to as the Mark IIIF or "Mark 5" by enthusiasts) was released in 1999. The hatchback models featured updated styling including new headlights and bumpers and an all new interior based on that of the Lupo. Although the car was similar in appearance to the Mark 3 (the bodyshell was fully galvanised and stiffened but not fully redesigned, although some panels were changed), Volkswagen claimed that 70% of the components were new. Power steering, antilock brakes and twin airbags were made standard. The saloon and estate versions received the new interior, but not the full exterior facelift. Also, the three-cylinder 1.4-litre TDI engine was introduced for the three and five-door hatchbacks.

Specification options ranged from power steering, tinted glass, split rear seats, electric windows and cup holders to ABS, air conditioning, Xenon headlights and satellite navigation. Thirty-two models with seven engines ranging from the 1.4 diesel to the 1.6 L 16V GTI made the choice of Polo the widest ever seen. The base model was the Comfortline with the option of no less than 5 engines ranging from the 1.0 50 PS (37 kW) to the 1.9 TDI unit found across the VW range, producing 90 PS (66 kW). The 1.0 L hatchback was considered cheap for the build quality and spec list when compared to other cars. Then came the Trendline and Highline models. With engine options ranging from 60 PS (44 kW) to a 110 PS (81 kW) diesel they offered a range of features usually found on the more sporty models but without the insurance or running cost woes.

Volkswagen also introduced a GTI version of this facelift, equipped with a further developed 1.6l 16v engine from the 6N with 92 kW (125 hp). The GTI is recognizable by unique Xenon headlights with washers, honeycomb grilles, 10mm lower suspension, a thicker front lip and original 15" BBS rims with wider 195mm tires.

Both versions of the Mark III Polo sold well in the United Kingdom against competitors like the Fiat Punto and Nissan Micra. At the time of its launch, it was arguably the best small car on sale in Europe in terms of build quality and "upmarket" feel, although its ride and handling were generally not considered to be as good as that of the Ford Fiesta or Peugeot 206. The 1.4 TDI was considered the best in the range due to its reliability, fuel consumption, and relative power, for a small engine.

== Awards ==
- 1999 Used Car Buyer Greatest Used Car Buy Awards – Best Economy Car
- 1998 Top Gear Magazine Top Cars – Best Supermini
- 1997 Which? Magazine Best Buys – Best Supermini
- 1997 Auto Express New Car Honours – Best Supermini
- 1997 Complete Car of the Year Awards – Best Supermini
- 1996 Semperit Irish Car of the Year
- 1995 What Car? – Car of the Year

== Outside Europe ==
=== Asia ===
In some Asia Pacific markets, the Polo Classic (1995–2002 MY) was sold as the Derby.

In China, FAW-Volkswagen simply rebadged the SEAT Cordoba without the exterior modifications of the European Derby (i.e. rear and front bumpers/headlights). It was sold & assembled as the FAW-VW City-Golf during 1996. This version was also sold in Russia as the Volkswagen Polo Classic S. It is not to be confused with the Canadian Mark 4 City Golf released in 2006 in Canada. The Polo Classic similar to the Chinese market version was also sold in the Philippines from 1996 to 1999.

=== Latin America ===
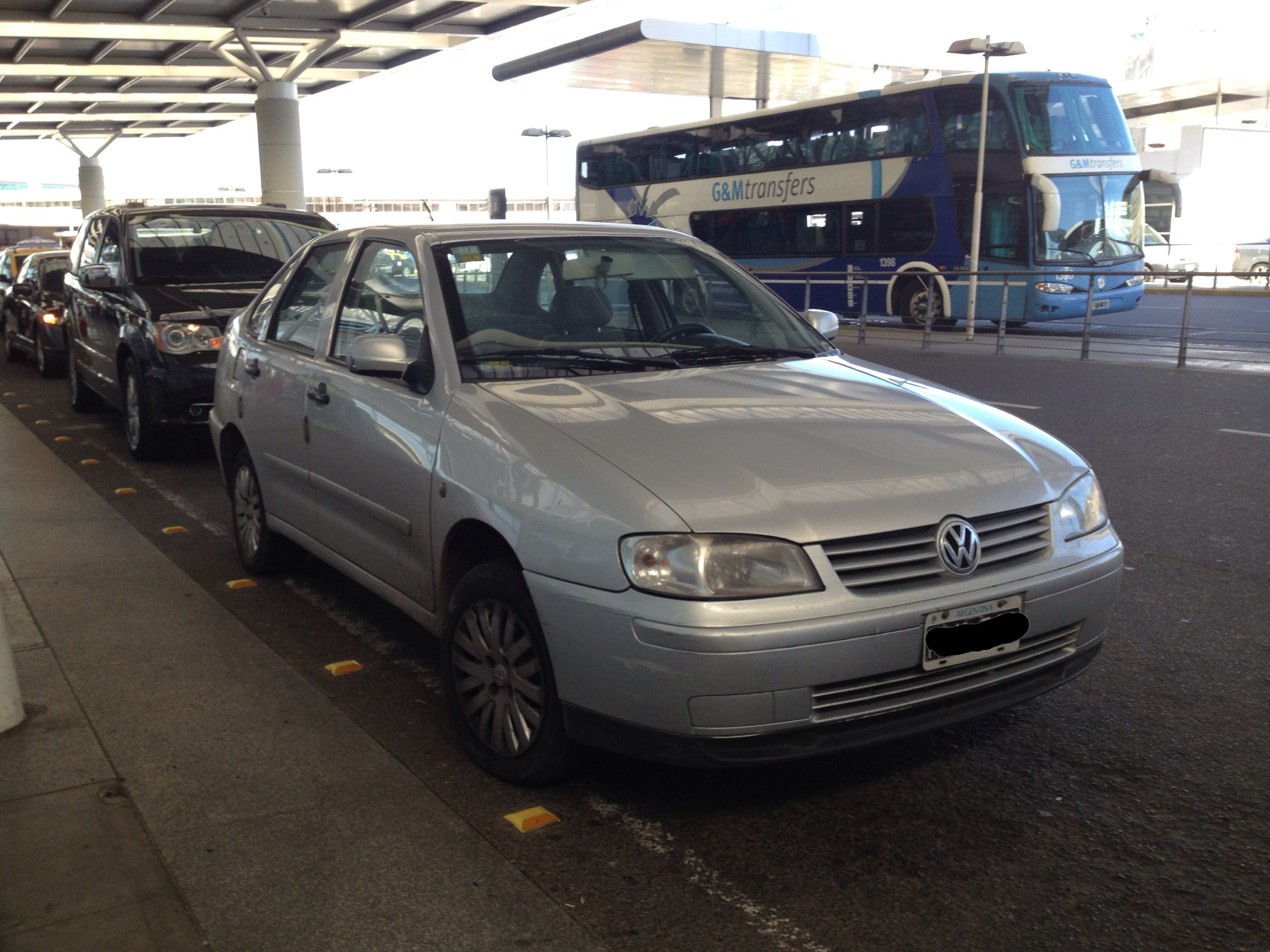
Argentine facelifted Polo Classic

In Argentina, Volkswagen produced the Polo Classic, which was sold as the Derby in Mexico, and the Volkswagen Caddy, a SEAT Inca-derived van, which shares the same platform and front end styling as the Polo Classic. The Polo Classic (Typ 6K) and the Caddy (Typ 9K) have been produced since 2000. All the facelifted models are Argentine-built models.

Latin America had its own trim levels, although some of the trim level names were similar to their European counterparts. The CL and GL were available from 1996 onwards in Brazil; these were similar to their European counterparts, although slightly more expensive due to import tariffs.

== Related models ==
- The SEAT Ibiza Mark 2 was based on the same platform as the Mk3 Polo Classic and Variant, as were the SEAT Inca and Volkswagen Caddy panel vans.
- The South African built Volkswagen Polo Playa was a rebadged version of the SEAT Ibiza Mark 2, and was sold instead of the European Polo in South Africa until the introduction of the Polo Mark 4.
- The Volkswagen Lupo and SEAT Arosa city cars were based on a shortened version of the 6N platform, and shared many components.

== See also ==
- Volkswagen Polo for an overview of all models
- Volkswagen Polo Mk1
- Volkswagen Polo Mk2
- Volkswagen Polo Mk4
- Volkswagen Polo Mk5
- Volkswagen Polo Mk6

Preceded by Volkswagen Polo Mk2	Volkswagen Polo Mk3; 1994–2009	Succeeded by Volkswagen Polo Mk4
