= Volkswagen Lupo =

Motor vehicle 1998–2005

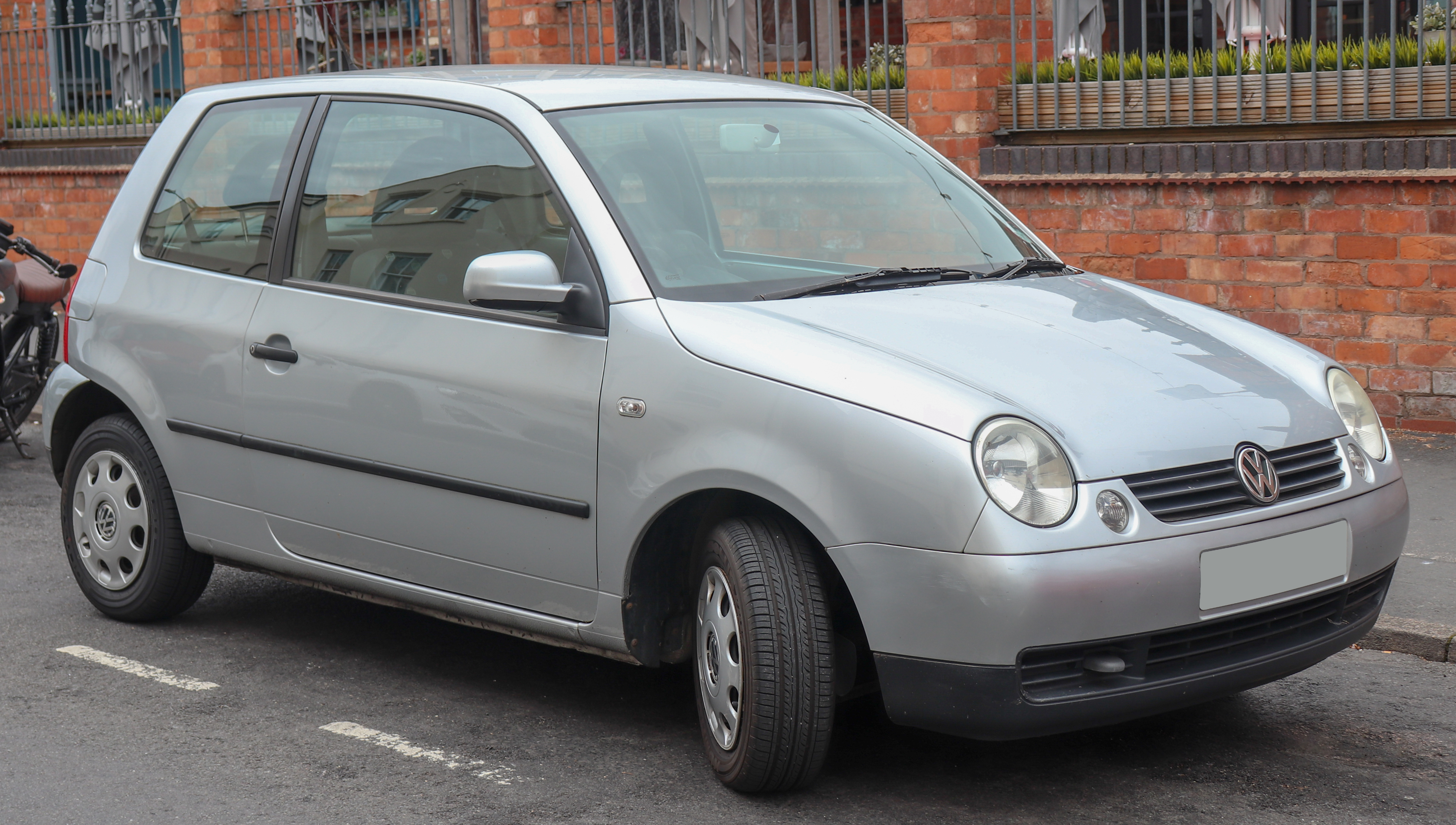

Overview
- Manufacturer: Volkswagen
- Production: 1997–2005
- Assembly: Germany: Wolfsburg (Note: Between 1998 and 2006; from 2001, the 3L, GTI models only.); Belgium: Brussels (Note: Between 2001 and 2006; except 3L, GTI models.)
- Designer: Jozef Kabaň

Body and chassis
- Class: City car (A)
- Body style: 3-door hatchback
- Layout: Front-engine, front-wheel-drive
- Platform: Volkswagen Group A00 platform
- Related: SEAT Arosa

Powertrain
- Engine: petrol: 1.0 L I4; 1.4 L I4; 1.6 L I4; diesel: 1.2 L turbo I3; 1.4 L turbo I3; 1.7 L I4
- Transmission: 5-speed manual 6-speed manual 5-speed automated manual 4-speed automatic

Dimensions
- Wheelbase: 2,318 mm (91.3 in)
- Length: 3,524 mm (138.7 in)
- Width: 1,640 mm (64.6 in)
- Height: 1,457 mm (57.4 in)
- Curb weight: 975 kg (2,150 lb)

Chronology
- Successor: Volkswagen Fox

The Volkswagen Lupo (Typ 6X) is a city car that was produced by the German car manufacturer Volkswagen from 1998 to 2005. It shares most of its aspects with the Volkswagen Group's SEAT Arosa, both derived from the Volkswagen Polo Mk3 platform, mainly differing in styling and equipment. It is a three-door hatchback with a front-engine, front-wheel-drive layout. The Lupo name is Latin, meaning wolf, and is named after its home town of Wolfsburg.

== Model history ==
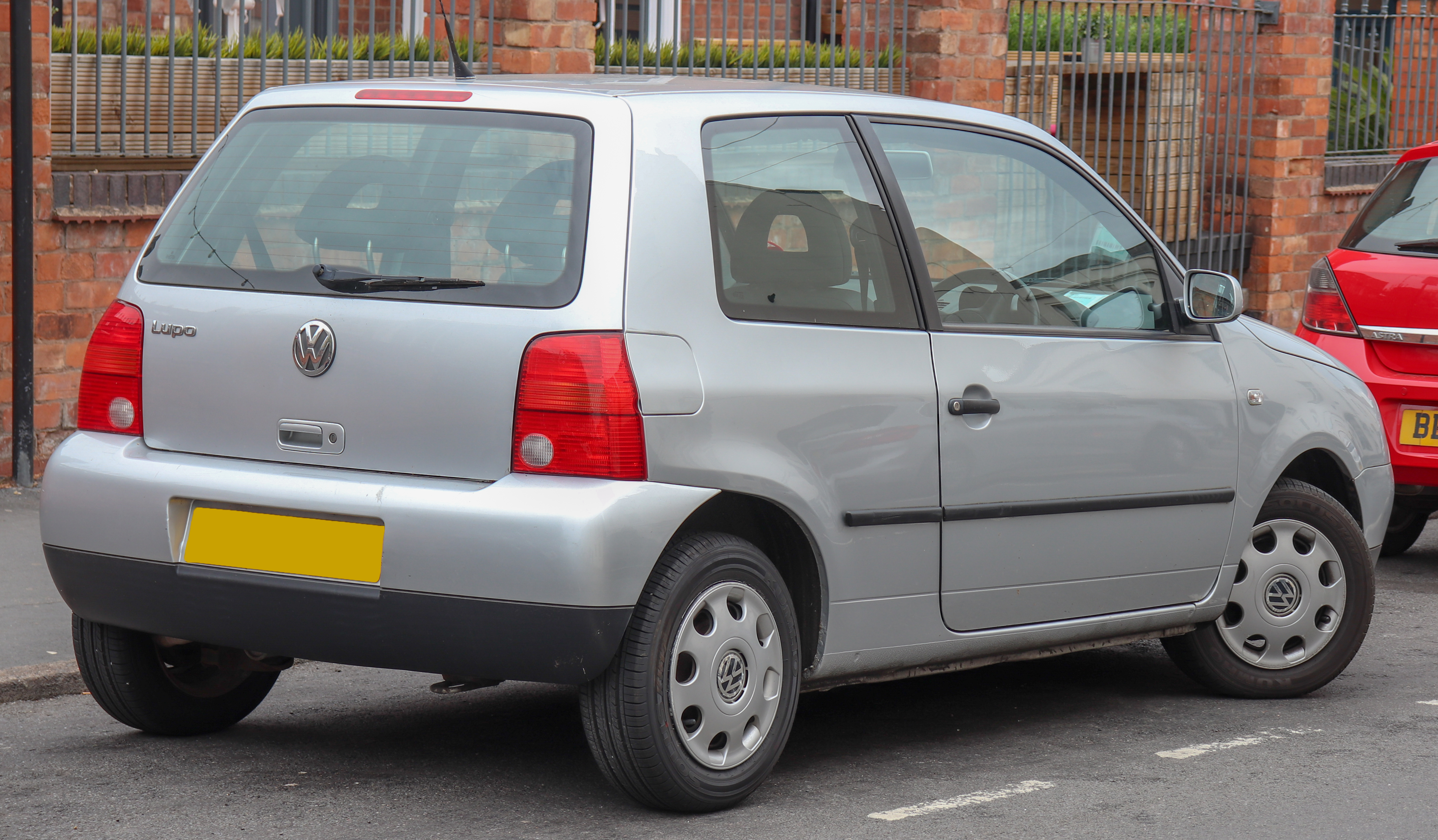
Rear view

The Lupo was introduced in October 1998, to fill the void at the bottom of the Volkswagen model range caused by the increasing size and weight of the Polo. The right-hand-drive version for the UK market was launched in the spring of 1999. In Japan, two models with petrol 4-valve 1.4L and 4-speed automatic with lock-up on the 4th were launched on 11 July 2001.

Lupo uses the A00 platform which is a shortened version of the Polo/Ibiza A0 platform. Initially only available in two trim variants, the budget E trim and the upgraded S trim; the range later expanded to include a Sport and GTI variant.

Petrol engines ranged from 1.0 to 1.4 (1.6 for the GTI) with diesels from 1.2 to 1.7. The differences between the E and S trim included painted door mirrors, door handles and strip, central locking, electric windows, double folding seats and opening rear windows. The Sport also got a chrome centre exhaust and front foglights as standard.

The Lupo was designed by Jozef Kabaň.

=== Replacement ===
Sales of the Lupo were slow and missed Volkswagen's targets. In 2001 a Volkswagen source claimed that it was decided the Lupo would eventually be discontinued and replaced by a model built in China.

Production of the Lupo was discontinued in June 2005, and was replaced on the European market by the Brazilian designed Fox. Due to the decision taken by Volkswagen, to use the Fox instead of developing any genuine replacement for the Lupo. The Lupo's spiritual successor, Volkswagen up!, was released in 2011.

== Specifications ==
- Length: 3,530 mm (139.0 in)
- Width: 1,803 mm (71.0 in) with mirrors, 1,640 mm (64.6 in) without
- Height: 1,447–1,475 mm (57.0–58.1 in)
- Luggage capacity (rear seats up): 130 litres, (rear seats down) 833 litres
- Weight: 890–1,015 kg (1,962–2,238 lb)

== Engines ==
Name	Volume	Type	Output	Torque	0–100 km/h (0-62 mph)	Top speed	Years
Petrol engines
1.0 8v	997 cc (61 cu in)	4 cyl.	50 PS (37 kW; 49 hp) at 5000 rpm	84 N⋅m (62 lb⋅ft) at 2750 rpm	18.0 s	152 km/h (94 mph)	1998–2000
1.0 8v	999 cc (61 cu in)	4 cyl	50 PS (37 kW; 49 hp) at 5000 rpm	86 N⋅m (63 lb⋅ft) at 3000–3600 rpm	17.7 s	152 km/h (94 mph)	1998–2005
1.4 8v	1,390 cc (85 cu in)	4 cyl.	60 PS (44 kW; 59 hp) at 4700 rpm	116 N⋅m (86 lb⋅ft) at 3000 rpm	14.3 s	160 km/h (99 mph)	2000–2005
1.4 16v	1,390 cc (85 cu in)	4 cyl.	75 PS (55 kW; 74 hp) at 5000 rpm	126 N⋅m (93 lb⋅ft) at 3800 rpm	12.0 s	172 km/h (107 mph)	1998–2005
1.4 16v Sport	1,390 cc (85 cu in)	4 cyl.	100 PS (74 kW; 99 hp) at 6000 rpm	126 N⋅m (93 lb⋅ft) at 4400 rpm	10.0 s	188 km/h (117 mph)	1999–2005
1.4 16v FSI	1,390 cc (85 cu in)	4 cyl.	105 PS (77 kW; 104 hp) at 6200 rpm	130 N⋅m (96 lb⋅ft) at 4250 rpm	10.0 s	199 km/h (124 mph)	2000–2003
1.6 16v GTI	1,598 cc (98 cu in)	4 cyl.	125 PS (92 kW; 123 hp) at 6500 rpm	152 N⋅m (112 lb⋅ft) at 3000 rpm	7.8 s	205 km/h (127 mph)	2000–2005
Diesel engines
1.2 TDI	1,191 cc (73 cu in)	3 cyl.	61 PS (45 kW; 60 hp) at 4000 rpm	140 N⋅m (103 lb⋅ft) at 1800–2400 rpm	14.5 s	165 km/h (103 mph)	1999–2005
1.4 TDI	1,422 cc (87 cu in)	3 cyl.	75 PS (55 kW; 74 hp) at 4000 rpm	195 N⋅m (144 lb⋅ft) at 2200 rpm	12.3 s	170 km/h (106 mph)	1999–2005
1.7 SDI	1,716 cc (105 cu in)	4 cyl.	60 PS (44 kW; 59 hp) at 4200 rpm	115 N⋅m (85 lb⋅ft) at 2200–3000 rpm	16.8 s	157 km/h (98 mph)	1998–2005

== Versions ==
=== Lupo 3L ===
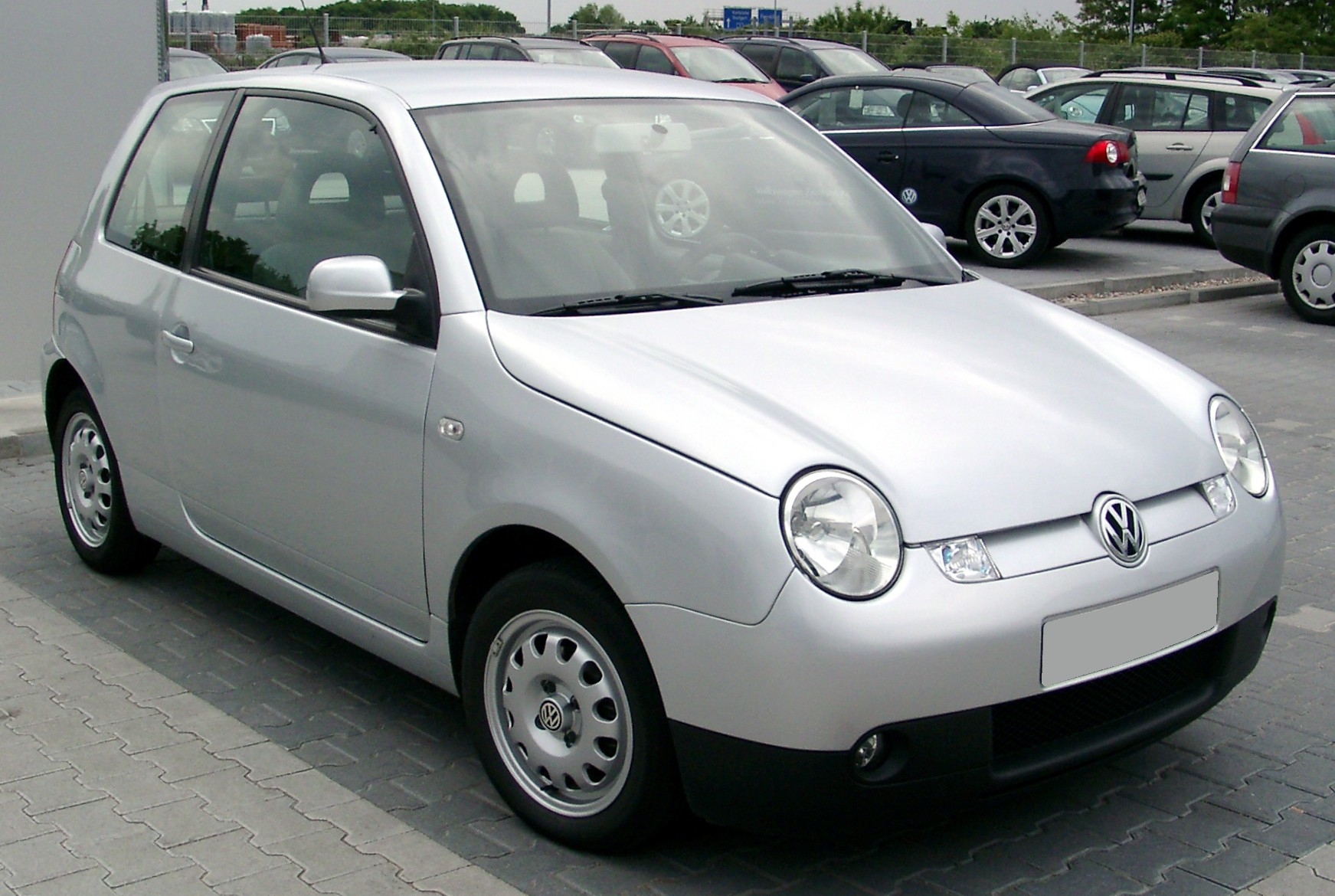
Volkswagen Lupo 3L

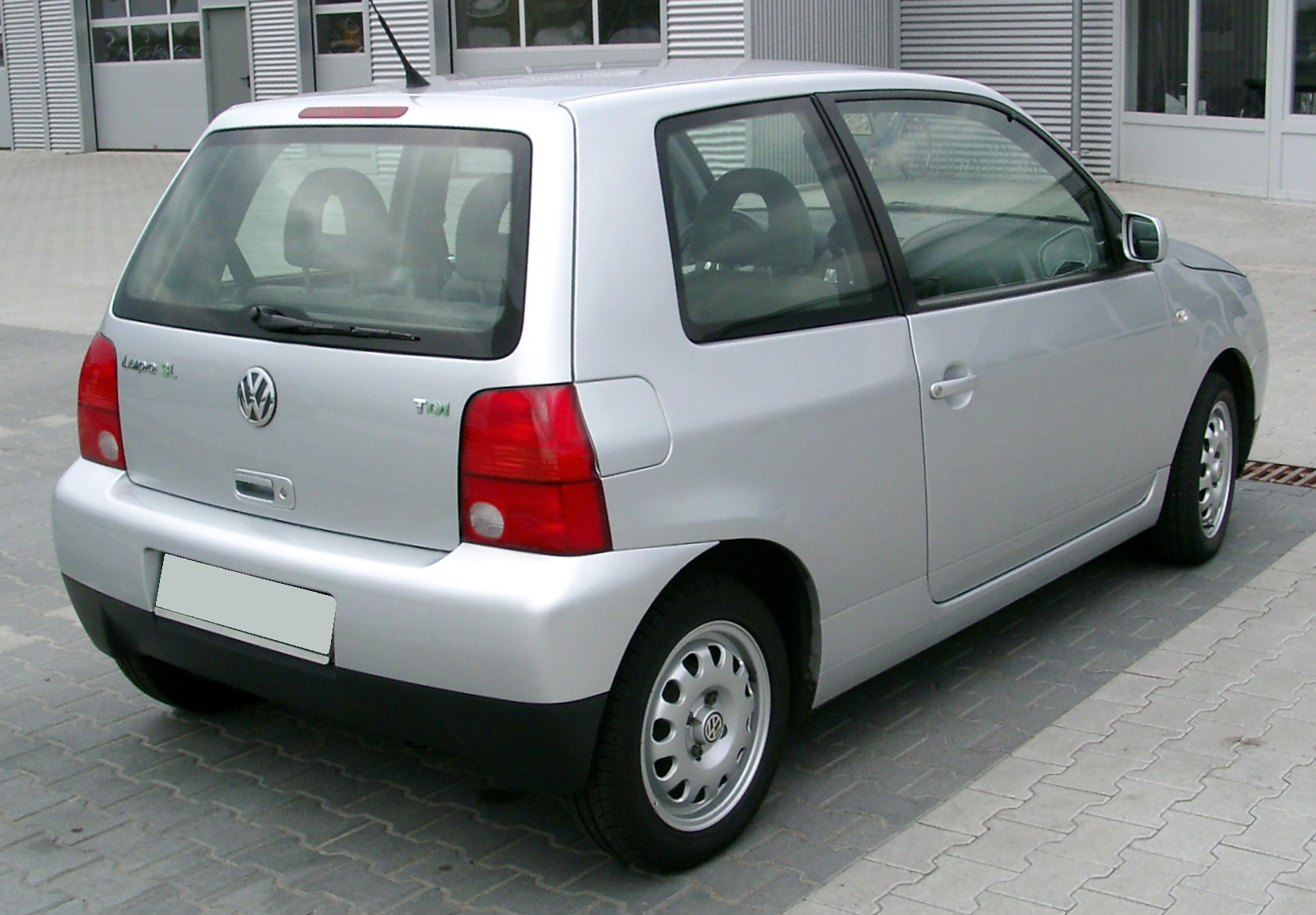
Volkswagen Lupo 3L

The Volkswagen Lupo 3L (Typ 6E) was a special edition made with the intent of being the world's first car in series production consuming as little as 3 litres of fuel per 100 kilometres (78 miles per US gallon or 94 miles per Imperial gallon). To achieve this, the 3L was significantly changed from the standard Lupo to include:

- 1.2 litre three cylinder diesel engine with turbocharger and direct injection
- Use of lightweight aluminum and magnesium alloys for doors, bonnet (hood), rear hatch, seat frames, engine block, wheels, suspension system etc. to achieve a weight of only 830 kg (1,830 lb)
- Tiptronic gearbox
- Engine start/stop automatic to avoid long idling periods
- Low rolling resistance tires
- Automated manual transmission and clutch, to optimise fuel consumption, with a Tiptronic mode for the gearbox
- Changed aerodynamics, so a $\mathbf c_\mathrm w\,$ value of 0.29 was achieved

The 3L, along with the GTI and FSI, had a completely different steel body to other Lupos, using thinner but stronger steel sheet. The car had an automated manual transmission with a Tiptronic mode on the selector and electro-hydraulic actuation system for the clutch and shifting. The car also had an ECO mode. When engaged it limited the power to 41 bhp (31 kW; 42 PS) (excluding kick down) and programmed the transmission to change up at the most economical point.

ECO mode also activated the start/stop function, a feature that was new to European cars at the time.

To restart, the driver simply takes their foot off the brake and presses the accelerator. In ECO mode, the clutch was disengaged when the accelerator pedal was released for maximum economy, so the car freewheels as much as possible, with the clutch re engaging as soon as the accelerator pedal or brake pedal is touched. The 3L also has only four-wheel bolts and alloy brake drums at the rear, along with many aluminium suspension components.

Initially, there were very few options on the 3L, as options added weight which affected fuel consumption. Those available initially were electrically heated and electrically controlled mirrors, fog lights, and different paint colours. In order to increase sales, other options were offered, including all electric steering, electric windows, and air conditioning. These options, however, increased fuel consumption slightly.

In July 2001, a Japanese economy driver, Dr. Miyano, used it to set a new world record for the most frugal circumnavigation of Britain in a standard diesel production car, with an average fuel economy figure of 119.48 mpg or 2.36 L/100 km. Later, in November 2003, Gerhard Plattner covered a distance of 2,910 miles through twenty European countries in a standard Lupo 3L TDI. He achieved his aim of completing this journey, which started in Oslo, Norway, and finished in The Hague in the Netherlands, with just €100 worth of fuel. In fact, all he required was 90.94 euros, which corresponds to an average consumption of 2.78 litres per 100 km (101.6 mpg).

The Lupo 3L shared its engine and special gearbox with the Audi A2 1.2 TDI 3L. As a result of this and other changes, this Audi A2 is also capable of reaching the same results as the Lupo 3L. According to the instruction manual of the Lupo 3L, the 3L engine also runs on Rapeseed Methyl Ester (RME) without any changes to the engine.

During the period of series production of the Lupo 3L, Volkswagen also presented the 1L Concept, a prototype made with the objective of proving the capability of producing a roadworthy vehicle consuming only 1 litre of fuel per 100 kilometres (235 miles per US gallon).

=== Lupo Sport ===
The Lupo Sport was available with the petrol 1.4 100 PS (74 kW; 99 hp) and the diesel 1.4 75 PS (55 kW; 74 hp).

There are a number of visual and mechanical differences compared to the lower trim levels. Sports had 14" Kyalami Alloys, front fog lamps, ABS (an option on diesels up to 2003), heated windscreen washer jets, and electric mirrors on later models. The petrol also had a central single exhaust and rear disc brakes. Early Sports came with "Tim & Tom" upholstery which was brightly coloured with cartoon cats and mice on, this was later changed to interwoven velour with sportier seats from the GTI.

The 1.4 petrol also differed from the one equipped in the S trim with different ECU, inlet cam, gear ratios, exhaust manifold, metal inlet manifold, bigger and drive-by-wire throttle body (instead of cable), bigger 256mm front disc brakes (vs 239mm).

=== Lupo FSi ===
The Lupo FSi was the first direct injection petrol powered production vehicle Volkswagen produced. A 5L/100 km 1.4 16v petrol version of the Lupo 3L with an average consumption of 4.9L/100 km. This direct injection engine next to a conventional engine with similar power uses around 30% less fuel. It had a similar automated gearbox to the 3L but with different gear ratios.

Outwardly, it was almost identical to a 3L but with a different front grille, slightly wider wheels with a different design and lacked the magnesium steering wheel and rear bumper of the 3L. Early 3L and FSi models had aluminium tailgates which were lighter and more aerodynamic than their standard Lupo counterparts. Early FSi models also had a unique spoiler while later ones without the aluminium tailgates were fitted with the same spoiler as the Lupo GTI. The FSi was only sold in Germany, Austria and Switzerland.

=== Lupo GTI ===
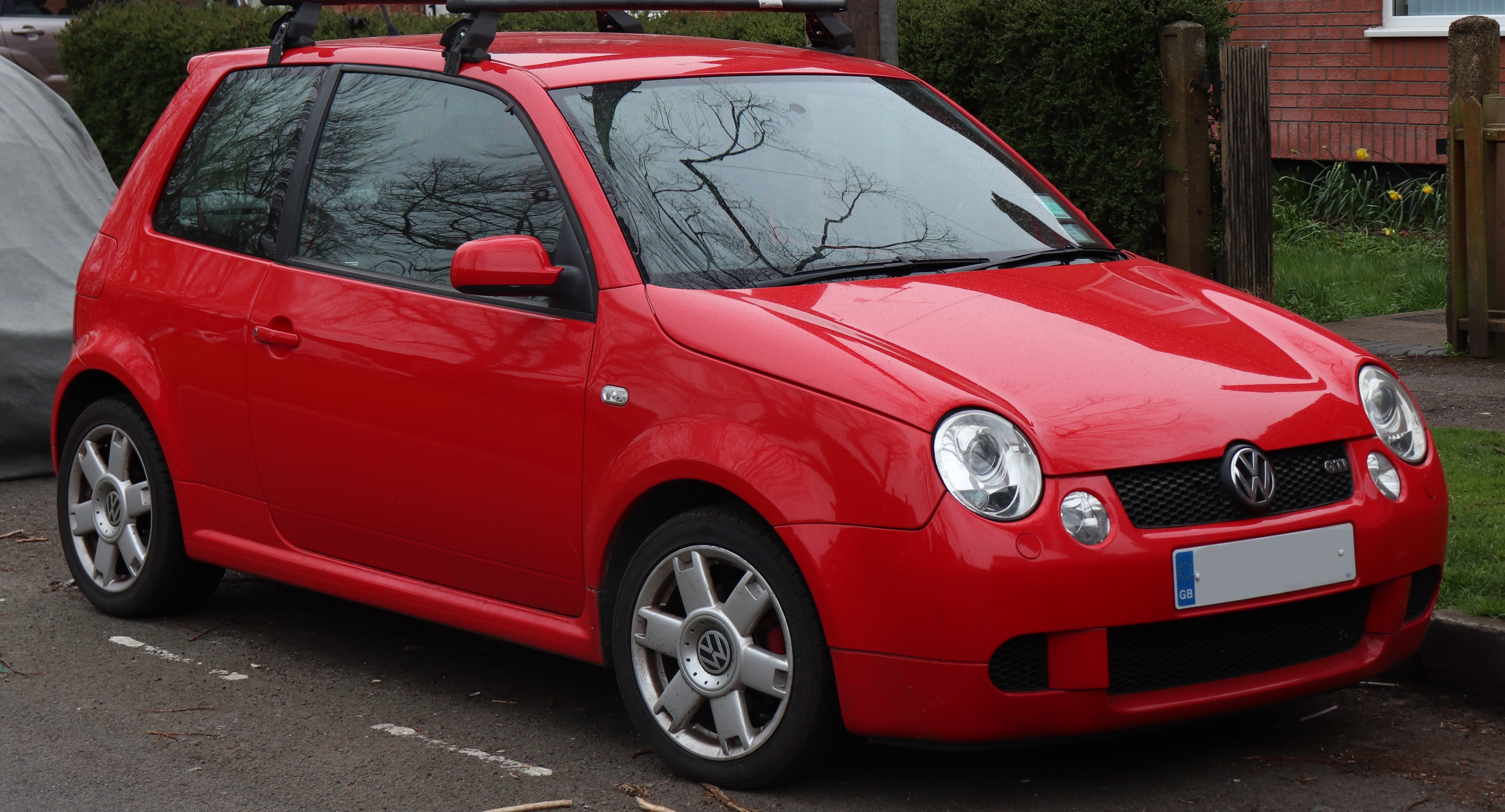

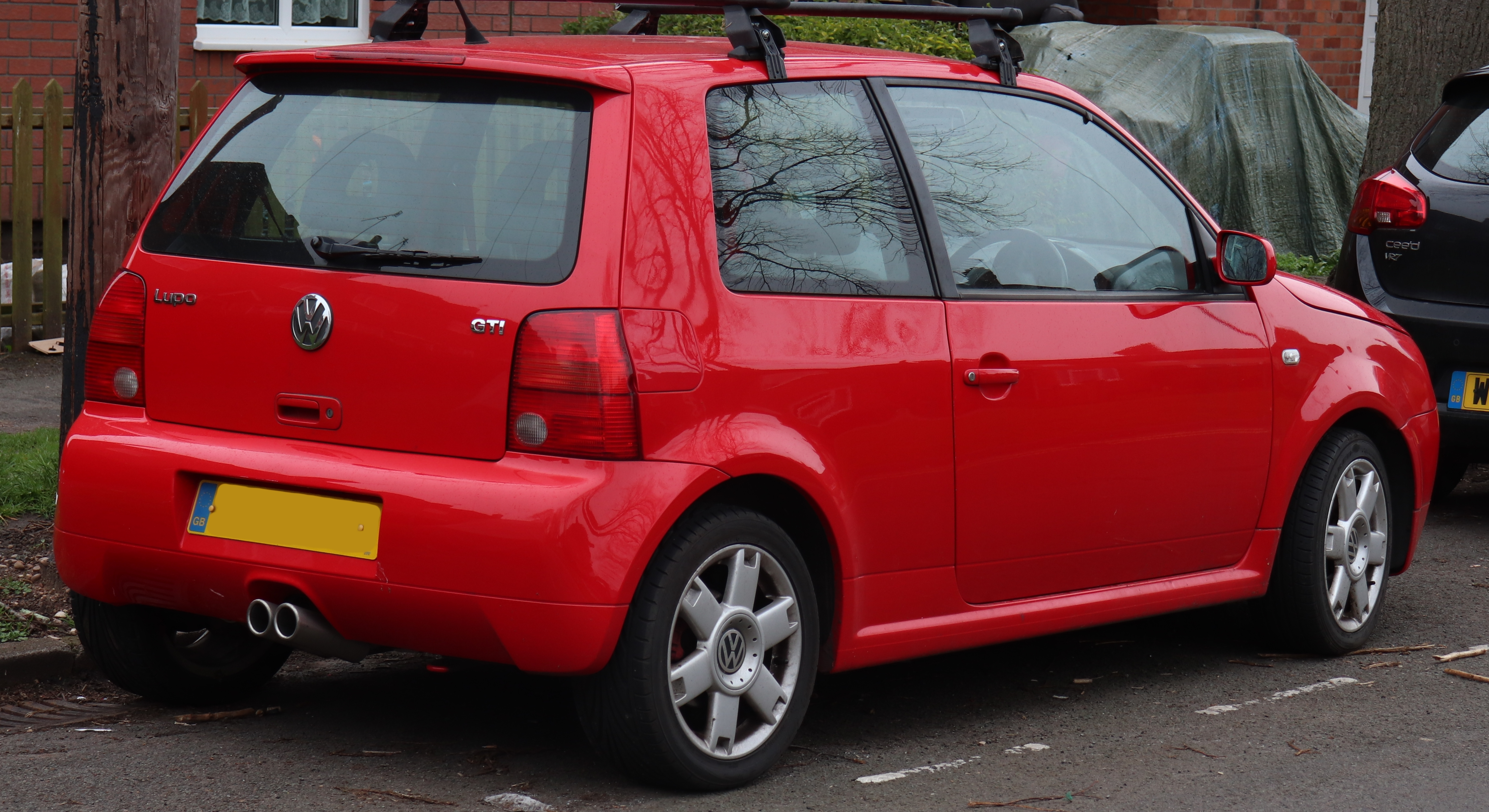
2001 Volkswagen Lupo GTI

The 1.6 L Lupo GTI, introduced in the year 2000, has been labelled a true successor to the Volkswagen Golf Mk1. The GTI can be identified by its fully body coloured bumpers and twin central exhausts. In March 2002, a six speed gearbox was added, together with improved throttle response, and was suggested as a competitor to the Mini Cooper, or the larger Volkswagen Polo GTI.

The GTI features much more standard equipment which was not available on any other in the Lupo range, including bi-xenon headlights, 15 inch Bathurst alloy wheels and an off black interior. With a DOHC sixteen valve four cylinder engine producing 125 PS (92 kW), the GTI had a top speed of 127 mph (204 km/h) and could accelerate 0 to 60 mph in 7.8 seconds.

== Production figures ==
More than 480,000 units of the Volkswagen Lupo have been produced through its lifetime.

The total production per year of the Lupo is shown below:

Year	1998	1999	2000	2001	2002	2003	2004	2005
Production	64,855	89,757	97,403	82,238	70,377	42,695	24,434	5,742

== Awards ==
- Best Micromini 1999 (Ireland)

== Literature ==
- Hans-Rüdiger Etzold (2012). So wird's gemacht: VW Lupo/SEAT Arosa 1997–2005 (in German) (7th ed.). Delius Klasing Verlag. ISBN 978-3-7688-1182-8.
