= Vasily Kabanov =

Soviet military personnel (1908–1945)

Vasily Grigoryevich Kabanov
- Василий Григорьевич Кабанов
- Born: 25 March 1908; Myzino, Sudogodsky Uyezd, Vladimir Governorate, Russian Empire
- Died: 18 April 1945 (aged 37); Neudamm, Nazi Germany
- Military career
- Allegiance: Soviet Union
- Branch: Red Army
- Service years: 1930–1945
- Rank: Major
- Unit: 220th Tank Brigade
- Conflicts: Soviet–Japanese Border Wars; Battle of Lake Khasan; Battles of Khalkhin Gol; World War II; Operation Iskra; Vistula-Oder Offensive; Battle of Berlin (DOW)
- Awards: Hero of the Soviet Union

Vasily Grigoryevich Kabanov (Russian: Василий Григорьевич Кабанов; 25 March 1908 – 18 April 1945) was a Red Army major and Hero of the Soviet Union. Drafted into the Red Army in 1930, Kabanov fought in the Battle of Lake Khasan and the Battles of Khalkhin Gol as a tank company Politruk. After being seriously wounded in fighting around Leningrad, he took refresher courses at the Red Army Military Academy of Mechanization and Motorization. Kabanov returned to the front in January 1945 as a tank battalion commander and fought in the Vistula–Oder Offensive, where his battalion helped take Skierniewice. For his leadership, Kabanov was awarded the title Hero of the Soviet Union. He was mortally wounded during the Battle of Berlin.

== Early life ==
Kabanov was born on 25 March 1905 in the village of Myzino in Vladimir Governorate to a peasant family. He graduated from seventh grade and worked at the Kuprian Kirkizh plant in Kovrov.

== Interwar ==
In October 1930, Kabanov was drafted into the Red Army. He served with the 41st Rifle Regiment in the Far East. He re-enlisted in the Mechanized Troops and became an officer. He joined the Communist Party of the Soviet Union in 1932. In 1937 he was sent to Moscow for a one-year course for political commissars. After graduation Kabanov became the political commissar of a tank company. He fought in the Battle of Lake Khasan and the Battles of Khalkhin Gol. For his actions, Kabanov was awarded the Order of the Red Banner.

== World War II ==
Kabanov fought in World War II from June 1941. He fought near Leningrad. In January 1943 Kabanov fought in Operation Iskra. He was seriously wounded. For his actions, Kabanov was awarded the Order of the Patriotic War 1st class. In 1943 he graduated from the Higher Officers School and then refresher courses at the Red Army Academy of Mechanization and Motorization.

After completing the courses, Kabanov returned to the front. He was given command of a tank battalion in the 220th Tank Brigade. He fought in the Vistula-Oder Offensive. On 14 January 1945, at the beginning of the offensive, Kabanov's battalion broke through and advanced 12 kilometers. The battalion was the first to reach the Pilica. The battalion crossed the Pilica and captured a bridgehead before advancing 40 kilometers, reaching Skierniewice. The battalion advanced into the city and captured it by 17 January. Kabanov was awarded the title Hero of the Soviet Union and the Order of Lenin on 27 February. He was promoted to Major and fought in the Battle of Berlin. On the night of 15 April the battalion conducted reconnaissance on the outskirts of Berlin and the brigade attacked the next day. In the ensuing battle, Kabanov was mortally wounded and died on 18 April 1945 in hospital. He was buried in a mass grave in Neudamm. Kabanov was awarded the Order of the Patriotic War 1st class a second time on 11 June 1945.

== Personal life ==
Kabanov married Lydia Yefimovna.

== Legacy ==
There is a memorial plaque to Kabanov at School No. 1 in Sudogda, where he studied. There is an obelisk of Kabanov in the Kovrov Alley of Heroes.
