= Kaban =

Kaban may refer to:

== People ==
- Kaban, a Khazar ruler; See Khalga and Kaban
- An Israeli military psychologist; See Profile 21
- Jozef Kabaň, a Slovak automobile designer
- Family name (Kabán). They live in Hungary.

== Places ==
- Kaban Lakes, lakes in Kazan, Republic of Tatarstan, Russia
- Kaban, Queensland, a locality in the Tablelands Region, Queensland, Australia
- Kaban, Olur

== Other ==
- "Kaban" (Masterpiece song), 2016
- A variation of cavan, a unit of measurement in the Philippines
- Kaban, an alternative name for the Somali Cuud/Oud lute

== See also ==
- Kanban, a scheduling system for lean manufacturing and just-in-time manufacturing
