= Volkswagen Group A00 platform =

Automobile platform

The Volkswagen Group A00 platform is an automobile platform shared among two models of city cars from the Volkswagen Group. It is based on a shortened A03 platform (PQ23), as used in the Volkswagen Polo Typ 6N.

== A00 platform cars ==
- Volkswagen Lupo (Typ 6X/6E, 1998-2005)
- SEAT Arosa (Typ 6H, 1997-2005)
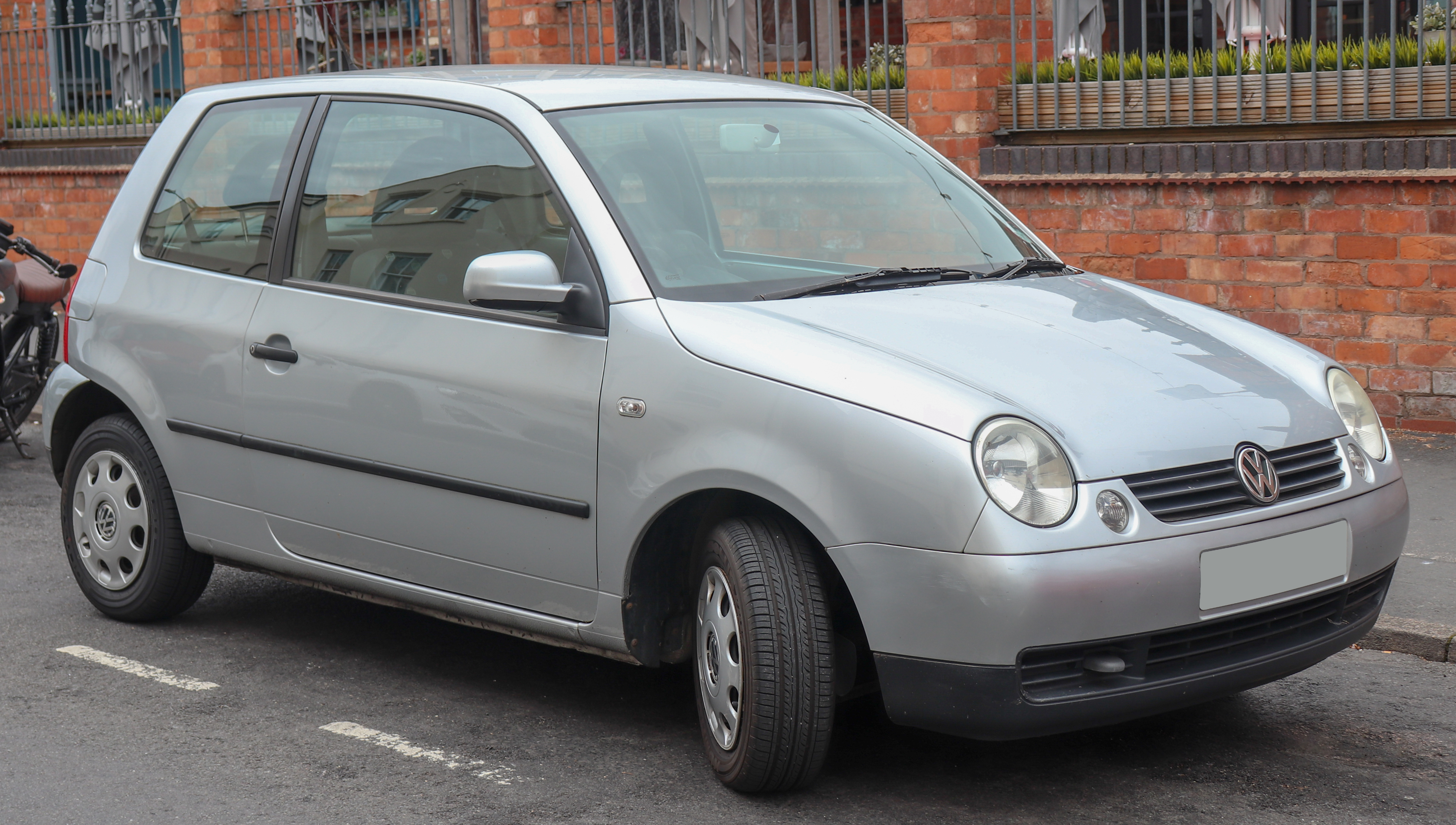
Volkswagen Lupo

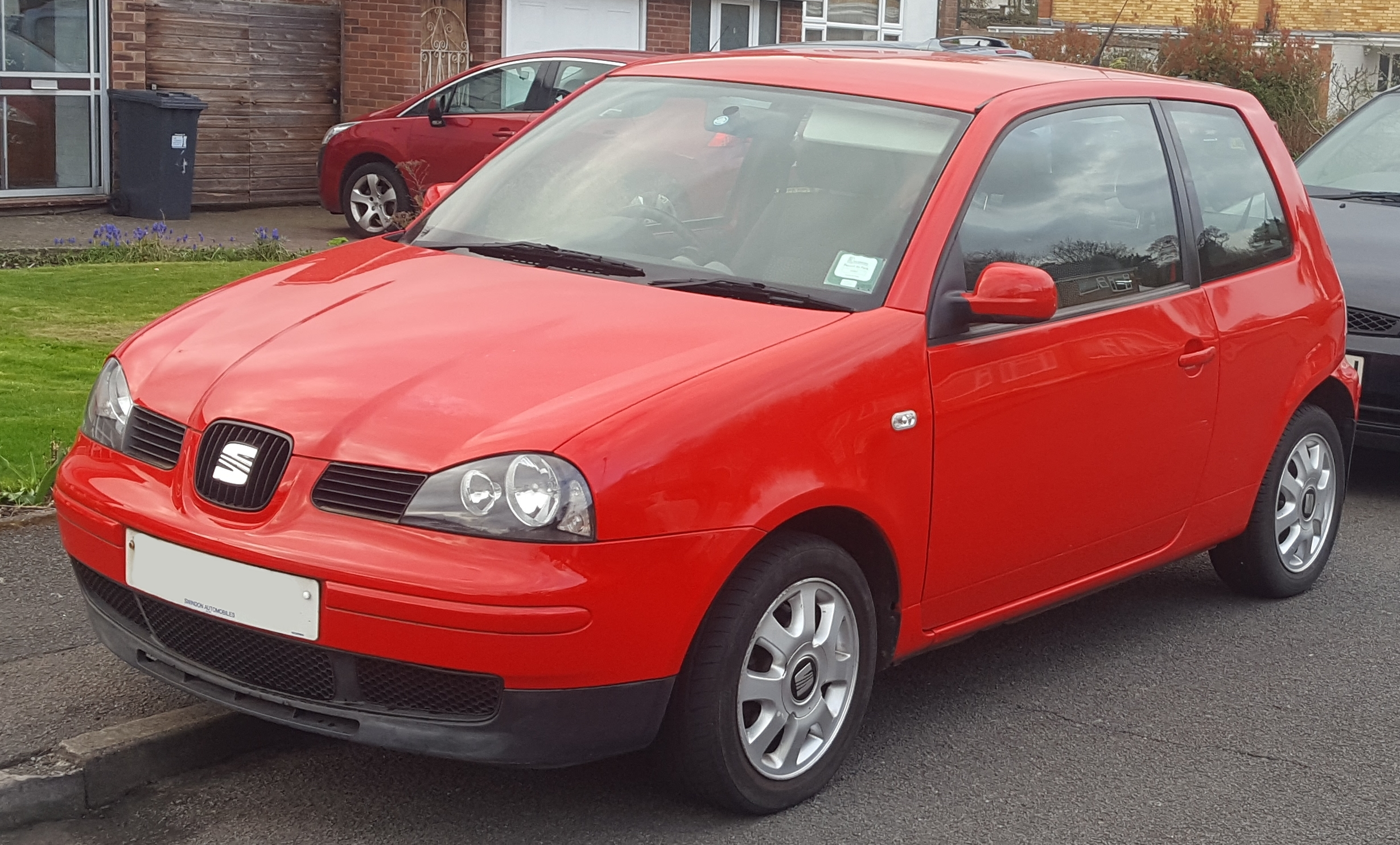
SEAT Arosa

== Successor ==
Successor of that platform is the new NSF platform which is also known as the PQ12 platform.
