= Myzino =

Myzino Мызино
- Village
- Location within Vladimir Oblast Location within Russia
- Coordinates: 56°03′N 40°53′E
- Country: Russia
- Region: Vladimir Oblast
- District: Sudogodsky District
- Time zone: UTC+3:00

Myzino (Russian: Мызино) is a rural locality (a village) in Lavrovskoye Rural Settlement, Sudogodsky District, Vladimir Oblast, Russia. The population was 29 as of 2010.

== Geography ==
Myzino is located 15 km northeast of Sudogda (the district's administrative centre) by road. Dorofeyevo is the nearest rural locality.
