= SEAT Arosa =

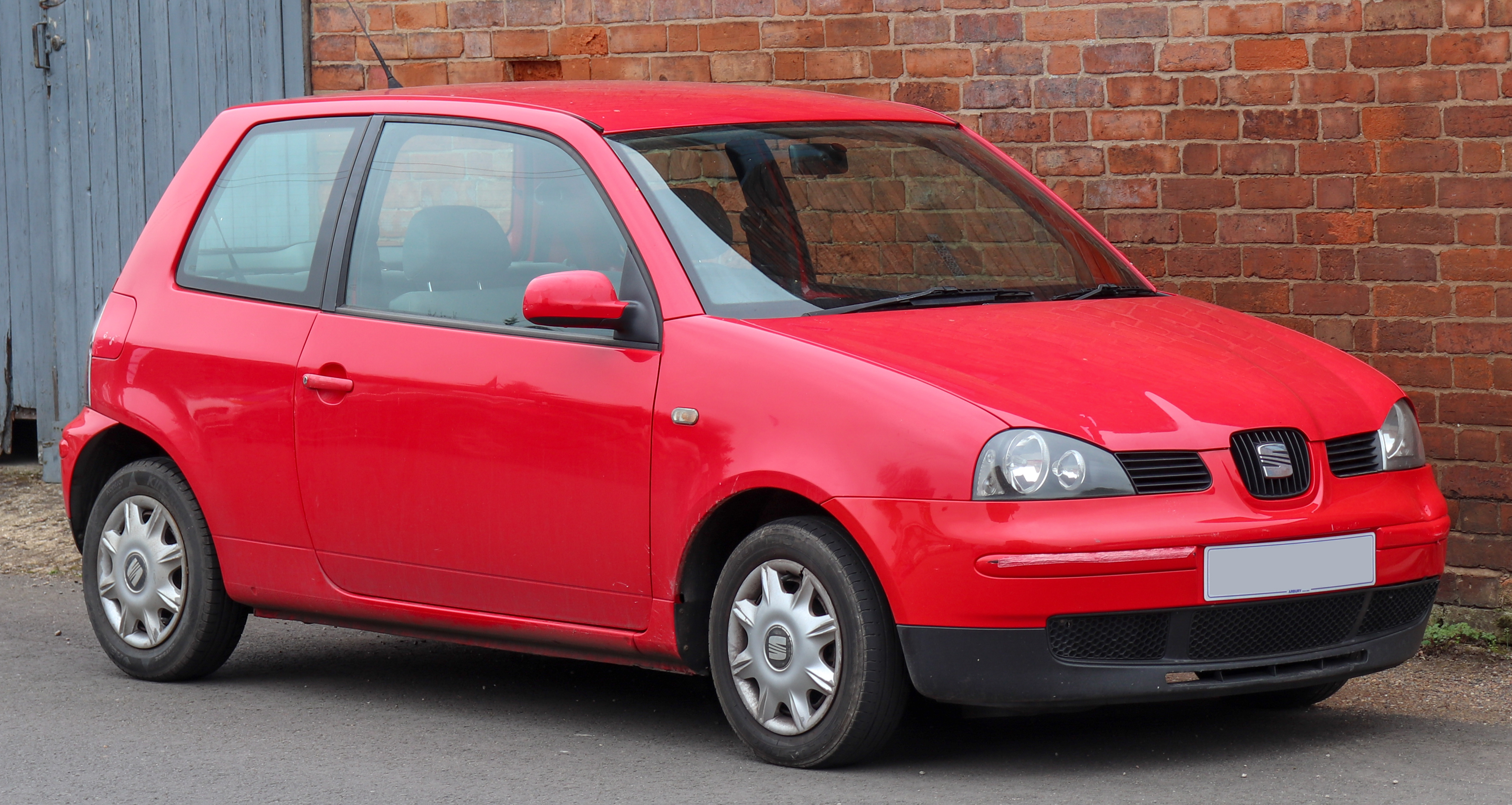

Overview
- Manufacturer: SEAT
- Also called: Volkswagen Lupo
- Production: 1997–2004
- Assembly: Germany: Wolfsburg (until May 1998); Spain: Martorell, Catalonia
- Designer: Jozef Kabaň

Body and chassis
- Class: City car (A)
- Body style: 3-door hatchback
- Platform: Volkswagen Group A00
- Related: Volkswagen Lupo

Powertrain
- Engine: 1.0 L I4; 1.4 L I4; 1.4 L I4 16 valve 1.4 L I3 TDI; 1.7 L I4 SDI

Dimensions
- Wheelbase: 2,323 mm (91.5 in)
- Length: 3,551 mm (139.8 in)
- Width: 1,639 mm (64.5 in)
- Height: 1,460 mm (57 in)

Chronology
- Predecessor: SEAT Marbella
- Successor: SEAT Mii

The SEAT Arosa (Typ 6H) is a city car that was manufactured by the Spanish automaker SEAT from 1997 to 2004. The model débuted in March 1997 at the Geneva Motor Show, while its facelifted version was presented in October 2000 at the Paris Motor Show. It shared a platform with the Volkswagen Lupo and was mostly identical apart from equipment, styling and trim levels.

The successor, SEAT Mii, started production in December 2011.

== Pre facelift (1997–2000) ==
Named after Vilagarcía de Arousa, a municipality in the province of Pontevedra, Spain, it was only available as a three door, four-seater hatchback.

The Arosa, launched in 1997, was to a large extent identical to Volkswagen's own city car, which was introduced later in the end of 1998, Volkswagen Lupo, and both cars were based on the Volkswagen Group A00 platform, a shortened version of the A03 platform used by the larger Volkswagen Polo and SEAT Ibiza.

The Czech motor vehicle manufacturer, Škoda, also planned their own version of the Arosa by 1998, but it was never officially introduced.

The Arosa was initially manufactured at a Volkswagen plant in Wolfsburg, Germany, and only in May 1998 was the production moved to SEAT facilities in Martorell, Spain. The Arosa was designed by the same man who designed the Bugatti Veyron 16.4, Jozef Kabaň. Production lasted from February 1997 to August 2000.

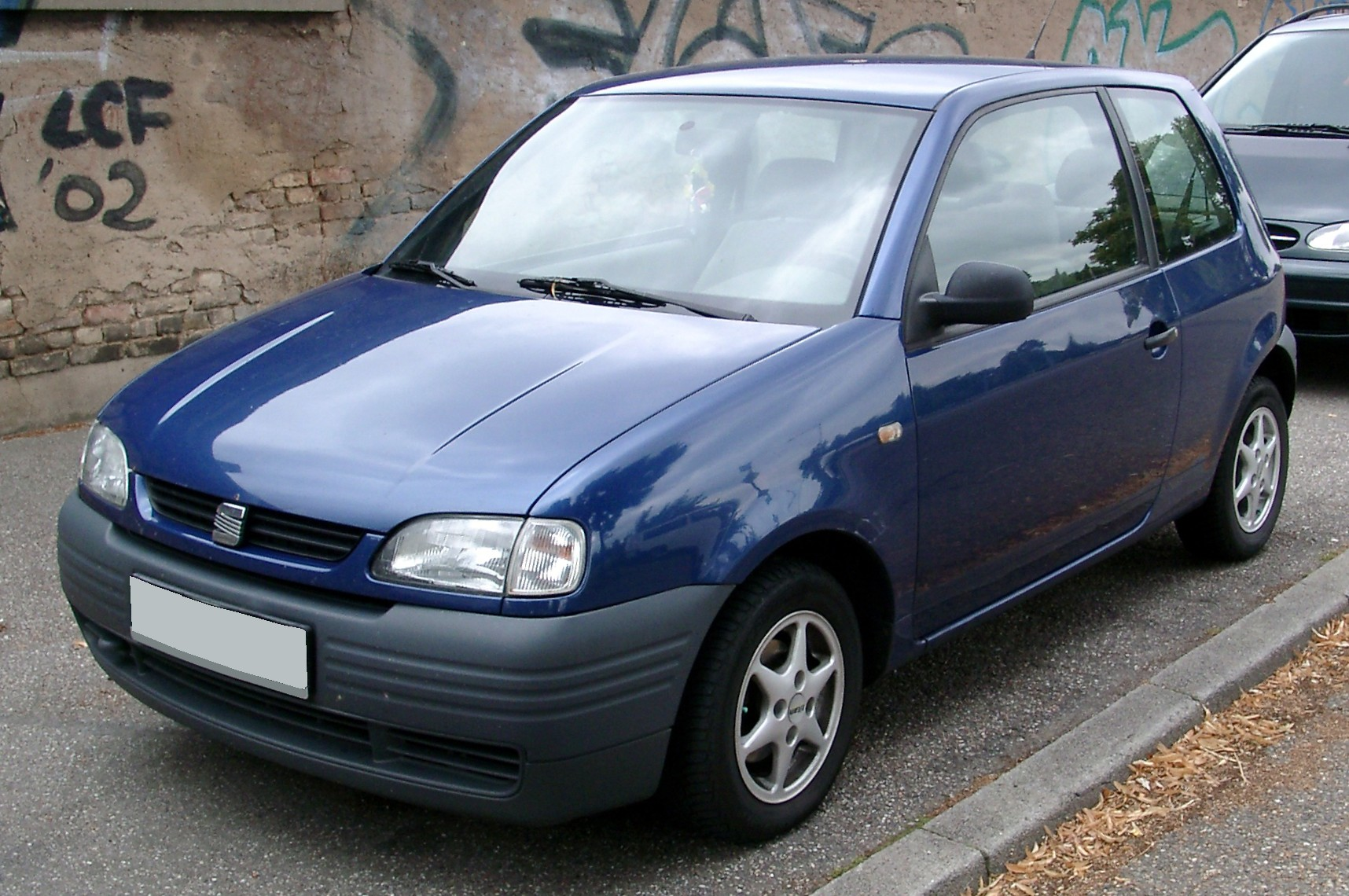
SEAT Arosa (pre facelift) front

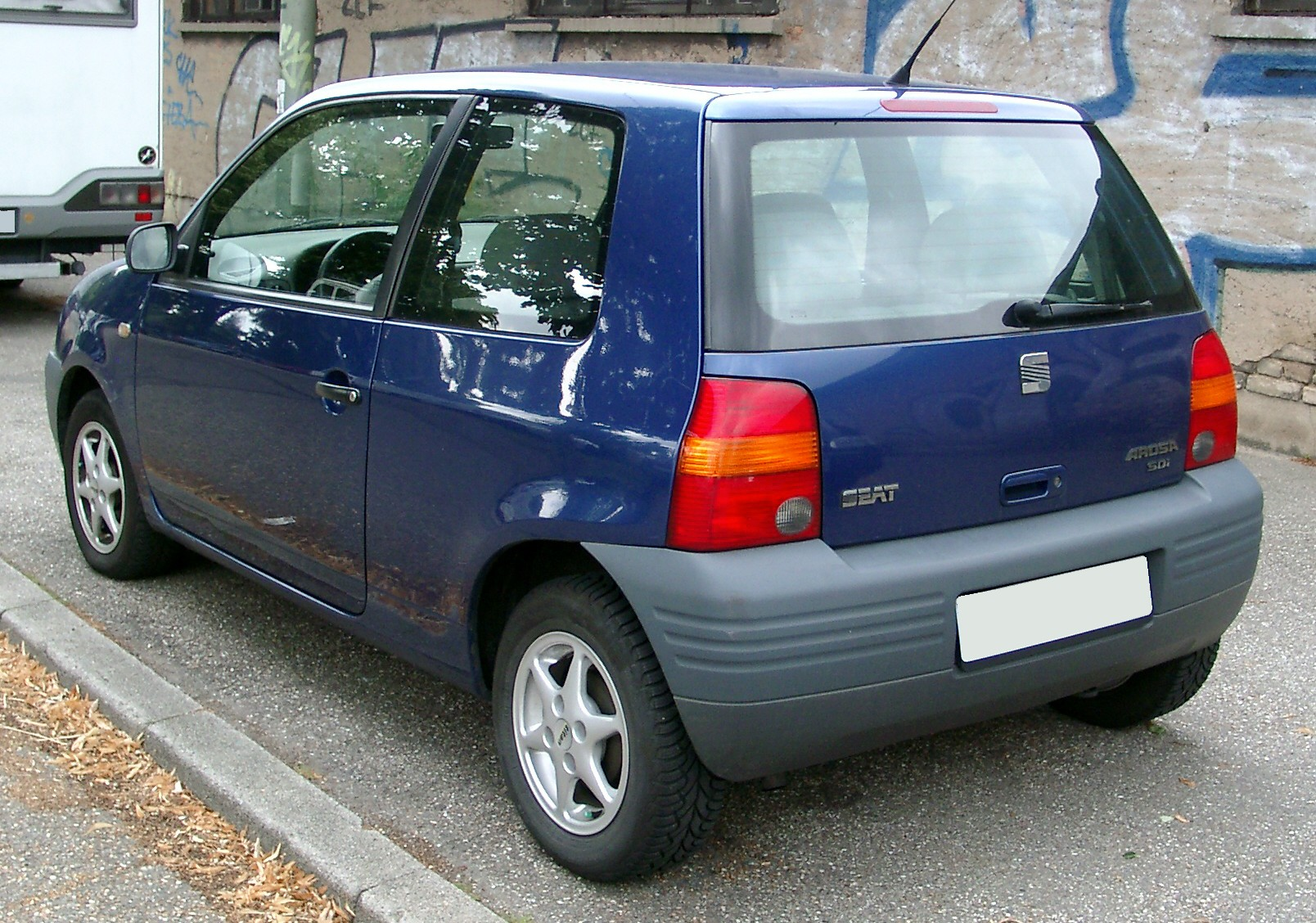
SEAT Arosa (pre facelift) rear

== Facelift (2000–2004) ==
The model later received a facelift in October 2000. The Arosa replaced the SEAT Marbella in the Spanish brand's lineup, but itself was not replaced by any SEAT, when production ceased in July 2004. A successor eventually arrived in January 2012, with the Mii. Apart from its exterior restyling, the facelift model featured a restyled interior, with a new dashboard.

Due to the decision taken by Volkswagen to use the Fox instead of developing any genuine replacement for the Lupo, SEAT was unable to produce their own version. In the United Kingdom, 2,500 Arosas found homes in the country in 2003, accounting for around seven per cent of the firm’s sales. Production lasted from September 2000 to July 2004.

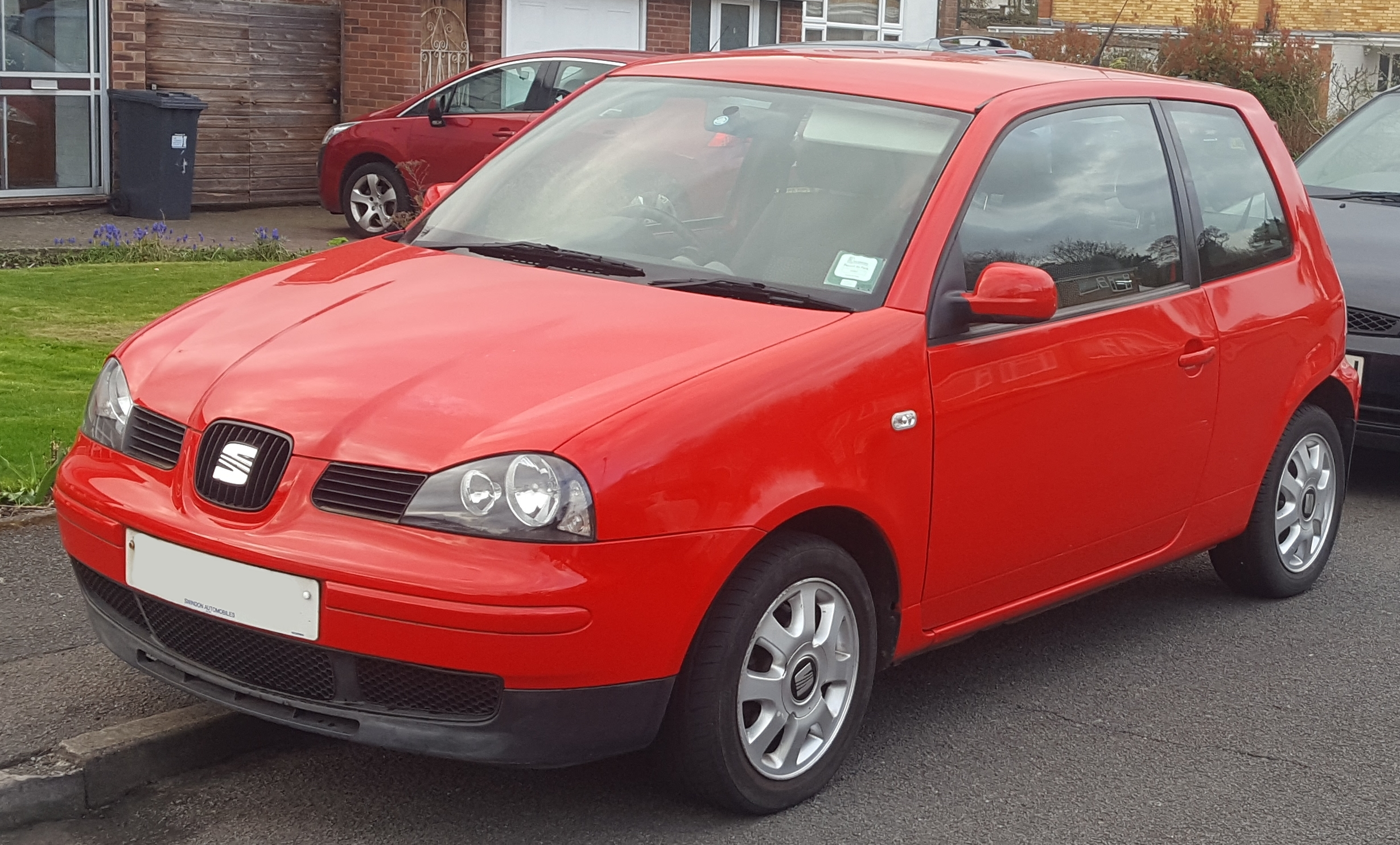
SEAT Arosa (facelift) front

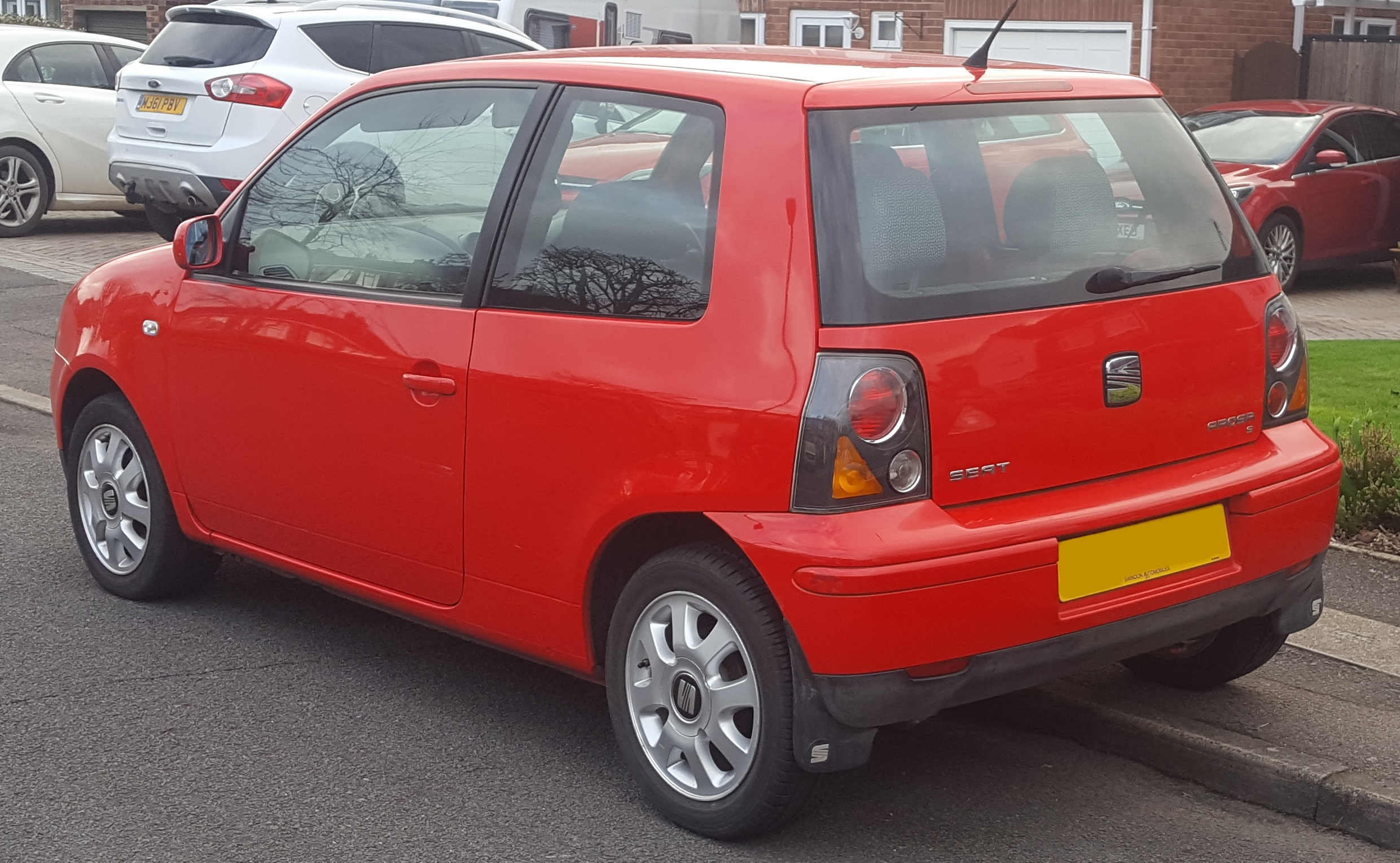
SEAT Arosa (facelift) rear

..

=== Engines ===
The Arosa was available with the following units:

Petrol engines

- 1.0 L (999 cc) I4, 8v OHC, 37 kW (50 PS), 86 N·m (63.4 ft·lbf)
- 1.4 L (1390 cc) I4, 8v OHC, 44 kW (60 PS), 116 N·m (85.6 ft·lbf)
- 1.4 L (1390 cc) I4, 16v DOHC, 74 kW (101 PS), 128 N·m (94.4 ft·lbf)

Diesel engines

- 1.4 L (1422 cc) TDI I3, 6v OHC, 55 kW (75 PS), 195 N·m (143.8 ft·lbf)
- 1.7 L (1716 cc) SDI I4, 8v OHC, 44 kW (60 PS), 115 N·m (84.8 ft·lbf)

All engines came with a five speed manual transmission, with a four speed automatic optional on the 1.4 (44 kW).

== Concept models ==
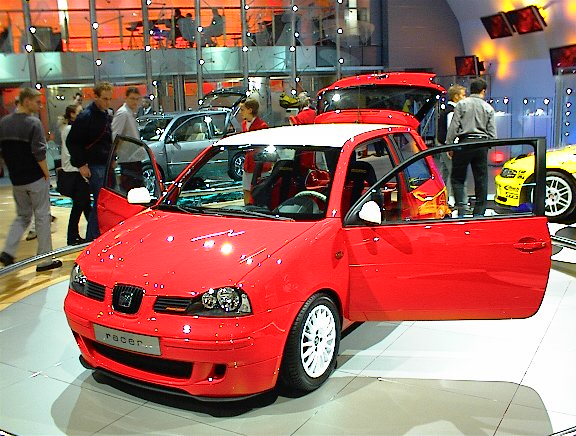
The 'SEAT Arosa Racer' concept car

At the Frankfurt Motor Show in September 2001, SEAT presented two SEAT Arosa based concept cars:

- the 'SEAT Arosa Racer'
- the 'SEAT Arosa City Cruiser'

== Sales and production figures ==
Since its launch in 1997 up to 2004, more than 175,000 SEAT Arosa cars have been sold and produced.

The total production per year of SEAT Arosa cars, manufactured in SEAT and other Audi/Volkswagen group plants, is shown below :

model	1997	1998	1999	2000	2001	2002	2003	2004
SEAT Arosa	42,741	38,338	46,410	28,403	22,980	19,627	13,814	9,368

== Awards ==
- Golden Steering Wheel 1997
- Utilitário do Ano Award 1998, in Portugal
