= Jozef Kabaň =

Slovak automobile designer (born 1973)

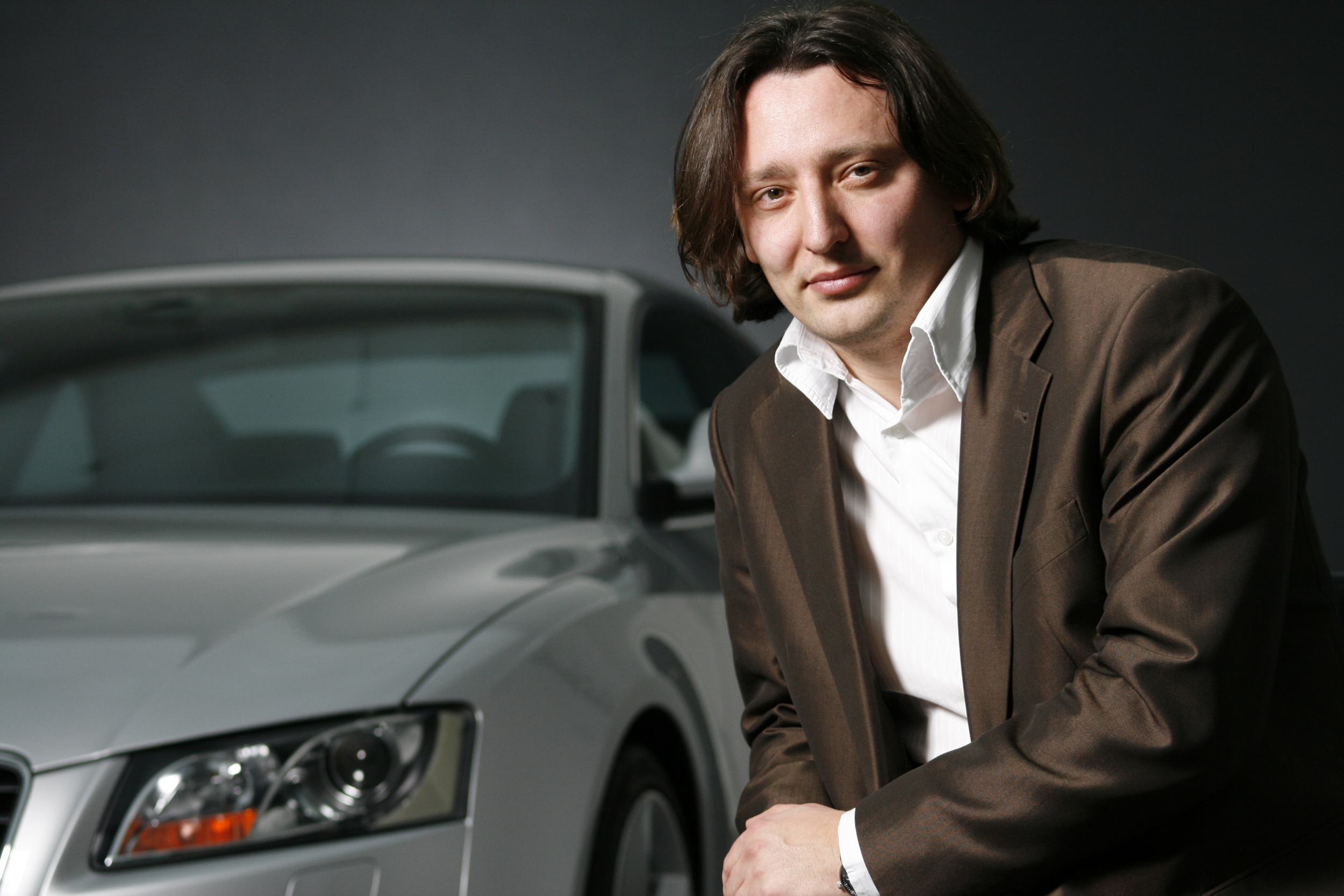
- Jozef Kabaň (2007)
- Born: January 4, 1973 (age 53); Námestovo, Czechoslovakia
- Education: Master of Arts; Industrial Design
- Alma mater: Royal College of Art; Academy of Fine Arts and Design
- Occupation: Automotive Designer of Bugatti
- Employer(s): Rolls-Royce Motor Cars Ltd; BMW AG; Volkswagen Group AG; Škoda Auto a.s. Bugatti Automobiles S.A.S. MG
- Notable work: Škoda Superb; Škoda Kodiaq; Škoda Octavia; Volkswagen Lupo; SEAT Arosa; Bugatti Veyron

Jozef Kabaň (born 4 January 1973) is a Slovak automobile designer. He started his career as a designer at Volkswagen. In 2003 he moved to Audi as an exterior design assistant. In 2007 he advanced to the position of Chief of Exterior Design at Audi. He was exterior designer of the Volkswagen Lupo, SEAT Arosa, Bugatti Veyron and Škoda Octavia. He has been Chief of Exterior Design at Škoda Auto since 2008. In early 2017 he left Škoda for BMW to become its head of design replacing Karim Habib. In 2019 he changed position within BMW Group and headed design at its subsidiary Rolls-Royce Motor Cars. After half a year he decided to leave Rolls-Royce and BMW Group returning to VW in January 2020, this time for its main VW brand. In early 2023, Kabaň was dismissed from Volkswagen and replaced by Bentley designer Andreas Mindt after failing to impress VW's CEO.

On April 22nd, 2024, MG Motor officially announced that Kabaň has joined the company as the Vice President of the Global Design Center.

== Education ==
Kabaň studied industrial design at the Academy of Fine Arts and Design located in Bratislava, Slovakia, starting from 1991. He graduated with a Master of Arts from the Royal College of Art, London, UK in 1997.
