= Kabani =

Kabani may refer to:

- Kabani, Bhamo, Burma
- Kabini River
- Kabani, Syria, a Syrian village
- Kabani (TV series), a 2019-2020 Indian Malayalam series
