= Mikhail Kabanov =

Red Army sergeant

Mikhail Mikheyevich Kabanov
- Михаил Михеевич Кабанов
- Born: 1919; Zamartyne village, Lipetsky Uyezd, Tambov Governorate, RSFSR
- Died: 28 November 1943 (aged 23–24); Zaporizhia Raion, Zaporizhia Oblast, Ukrainian SSR, Soviet Union
- Military career
- Allegiance: Soviet Union
- Branch: Red Army
- Service years: 1939–1943
- Rank: Sergeant
- Unit: 333rd Rifle Division
- Conflicts: World War II; Battle of the Dnieper †
- Awards: Hero of the Soviet Union; Order of Lenin; Order of the Red Banner; Order of Glory, 3rd class

Mikhail Mikheyevich Kabanov (Russian: Михаил Михеевич Кабанов; 1919 – 28 November 1943) was a Red Army sergeant and posthumous Hero of the Soviet Union. Kabanov was awarded the title for his actions during the Battle of the Dnieper, where he reportedly captured nine German soldiers.

== Early life ==
Kabanov was born in 1919 in Zamartyne village in Tambov Governorate to a peasant family. After graduating from seventh grade, he went to Moscow to study at a construction foreman school. He worked at a mine in Rovenky and later moved to the Far East, where he worked in construction. Kabanov was drafted into the Red Army in September 1939.

== World War II ==
Kabanov fought in combat from the beginning of Operation Barbarossa. He fought on the Southwestern Front. By September 1943 he was a squad leader in the reconnaissance platoon of the 333rd Rifle Division's 1120th Rifle Regiment. At the end of September, the division reached the Dnieper north of Zaporizhia. Kabanov's squad as part of the assault units crossed the river and advanced to the first German defense line on 26 September. Fire from a German machine gun stopped the advance. Kabanov and his squad overran the machine gun, capturing one German prisoner. Rapidly moving forward, Kabanov and his squad cut off retreating German troops, killing and capturing several. On the path to the Hill 150.3 the squad destroyed a German machine gun, reportedly enabling the capture of the hill. For his actions, Kabanov was awarded the Order of the Red Banner on 4 October.

Attempts to expand the bridgehead were stopped by German resistance and the division was withdrawn to the south of Zaporizhia with the aim of capturing another bridgehead. To prepare for the attack, the 1120th Regiment sent the reconnaissance platoon over the river to collect intelligence. On the night of 12 November Kabanov crossed the Dnieper under fire near Belenky village. Advancing into a German trench, he reportedly saw a German soldier preparing to throw a grenade at the other Soviet soldiers and killed him. During the reconnaissance mission, two more German soldiers were killed. After taking prisoners, the group recrossed the river. For his actions, Kabanov was recommended for the Order of the Patriotic War 1st class but instead received the Order of Glory 3rd class. The regiment crossed the river on the night of 26 November. The reconnaissance platoon was again the lead element and crossed to the Kanevsky Island by nightfall. During fighting for the village of Kanev, Kabanov reportedly captured nine German soldiers while advancing into a trench. He then reportedly used a machine gun and grenades to kill 12 more German soldiers. During the fighting, Kabanov was killed in action on 28 November.

He was buried in the village of Kaniv in Zaporizhia Raion. On 22 February 1944, Kabanov was posthumously awarded the title Hero of the Soviet Union and the Order of Lenin.
