= Ivan Kabanov (painter) =

Russian painter (1823–1869)

- Born: 1823; Staroverskaya, Buguruslansky Uyezd, Orenburg Governorate, Russian Empire
- Died: 30 November 1869 (aged 45–46); Saint Petersburg

Ivan Andreyevich Kabanov (Russian: Иван Андреевич Кабанов; 1823 – 30 November 1869) was a Russian painter.

== Biography ==
Ivan Kabanov was born in the village of Staroverskaya, Orenburg Governorate, Russian Empire.

In 1845–1849 he studied at the Moscow School of Painting, Sculpture and Architecture.

== Gallery ==
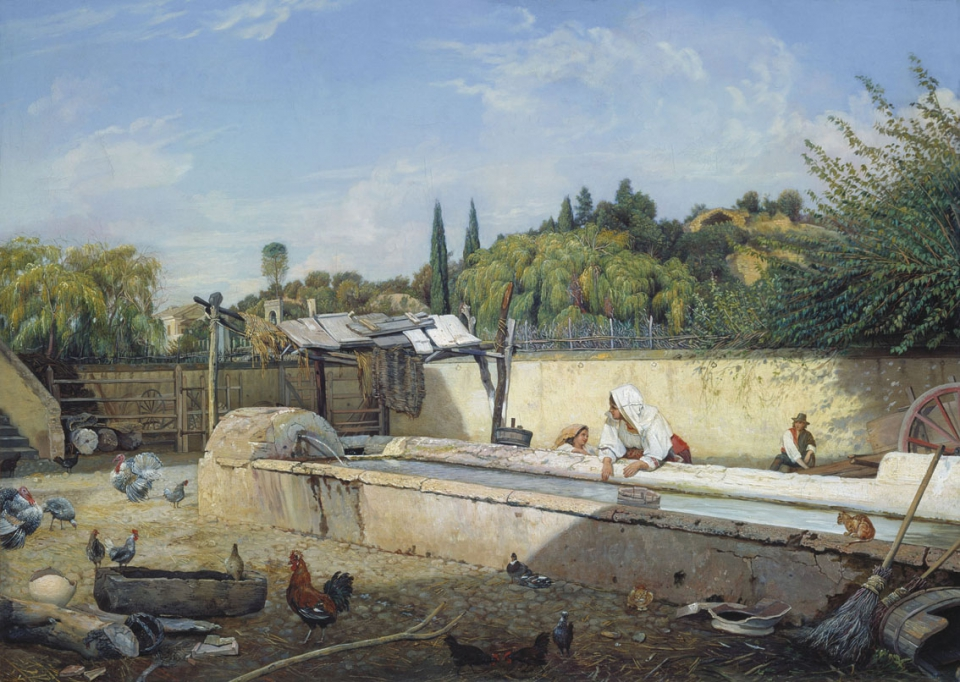
The terrace in the vicinity of Rome (1850s–1860s)

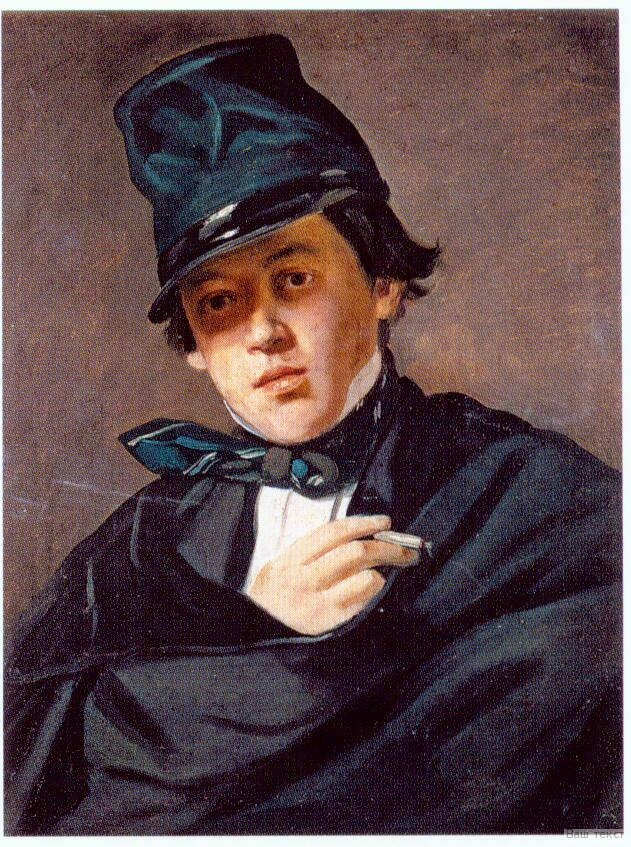
Portrait of Ivan Davydov (1856)
