= SEAT Córdoba =

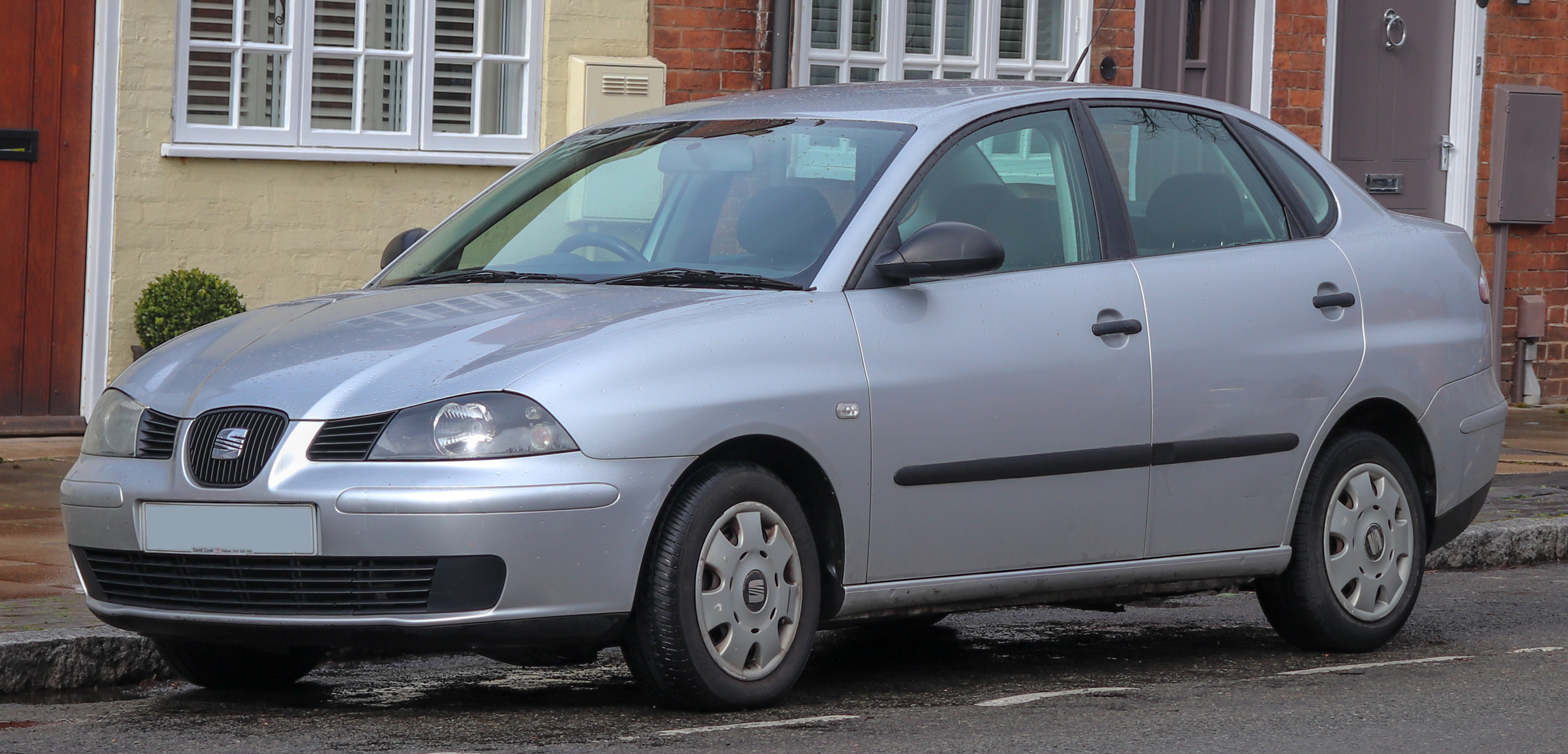

Overview
- Manufacturer: SEAT
- Production: 1993–2008

Body and chassis
- Class: Supermini (B)
- Platform: Volkswagen Group A0 series

Chronology
- Predecessor: SEAT Málaga
- Successor: SEAT Ibiza ST (wagon); SEAT Toledo (saloon)

The SEAT Córdoba is the saloon, estate and coupé version of the SEAT Ibiza supermini car, built by the Spanish automaker SEAT. It was manufactured between 1993 and 2008, and was related to the second and third generations of the Ibiza.

== First generation (Typ 6K; 1993) ==
First generation (6K)
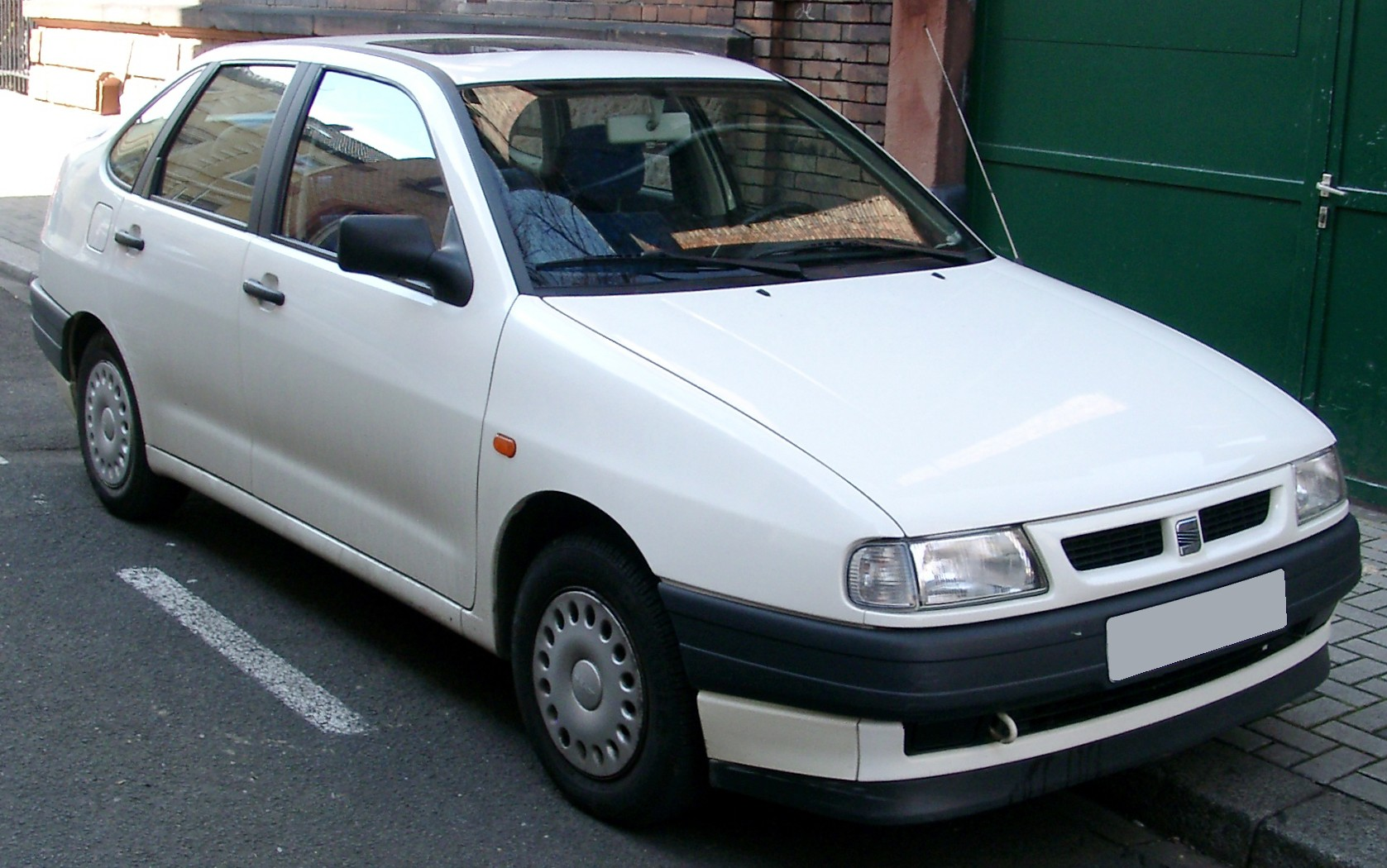

Overview
- Also called: SEAT Leon (Taiwan); Volkswagen Citi Golf (China); Volkswagen Derby (Mexico); Volkswagen Polo Classic (Europe, Argentina, Philippines, South Africa)
- Production: 1993–2002
- Assembly: Spain: Martorell, Catalonia; Argentina: General Pacheco (2000–2002); China: Changchun (FAW-VW: 1995–2001, Citi Golf); Mexico: Puebla (1996–2002, Derby); Philippines: Alaminos (PPC: 1996-1999); Poland: Poznań; South Africa: Uitenhage (1996–2002, Polo Classic)
- Designer: Giorgetto Giugiaro at Italdesign

Body and chassis
- Body style: 2-door coupé 4-door saloon 5-door estate
- Platform: Volkswagen Group A03
- Related: SEAT Ibiza Mk2; Volkswagen Polo Classic; Volkswagen Polo Mk3; Volkswagen Golf Mk3; Volkswagen Vento

Powertrain
- Engine: petrol: 1.0 L I4; 1.4 L 8V/16V I4; 1.6 L I4; 1.8 L 8V/16V I4; 1.8 L 20V turbo I4; 2.0 L 8V/16V I4; diesel: 1.9 L I4; 1.9 L SDI I4; 1.9 L TD I4; 1.9 L TDI I4

Dimensions
- Wheelbase: 2,440 mm (96.1 in)
- Length: 4,109 mm (161.8 in)
- Width: 1,640 mm (64.6 in)
- Height: 1,408 mm (55.4 in)
- Curb weight: 990 kg (2,183 lb)

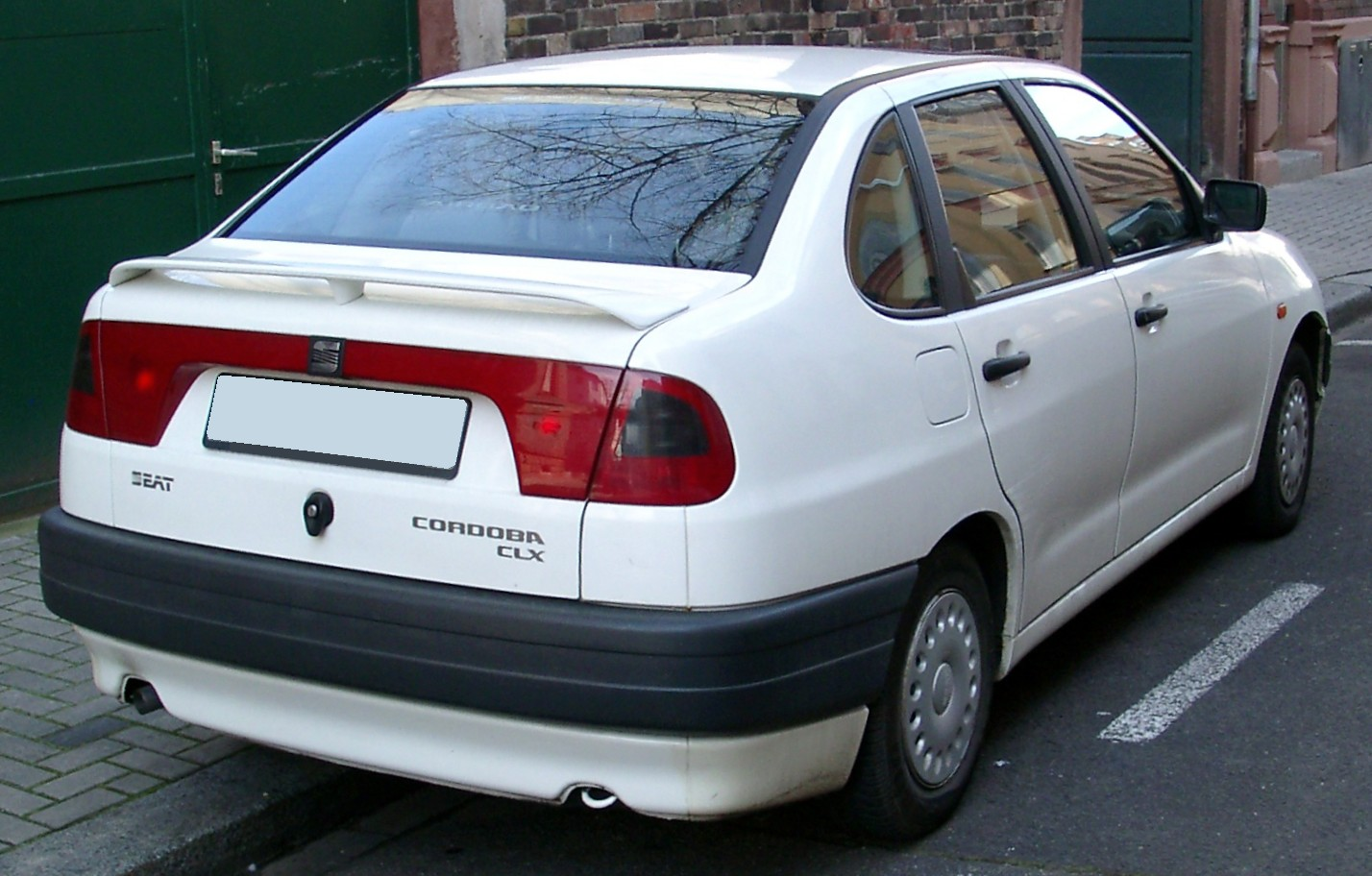
SEAT Córdoba Mk1 (pre-facelift)

The first-generation Córdoba was presented at the 1993 Frankfurt Motor Show and launched that summer. Designed by Italian Giorgetto Giugiaro, it was based on the chassis of the SEAT Ibiza Mk2. Its 1.4, 1.6, 1.8 and 2.0-litre petrol engines were also found in the Volkswagen Polo and Ibiza, as was the 1.9 TDI.

The vehicle featured a boot space of 455 litres (16.1 cu ft), which could be extended up to 762 litres (26.9 cu ft) by folding rear seats.

=== Variants ===
In 1996, the Córdoba range was extended with a coupé (Córdoba SX) and an estate (Córdoba Vario).

==== SX ====
The Córdoba SX was a two-door coupé version of the Córdoba. It came with five engine variants: 1.6 litre 100 PS (74 kW); 1.9 litre turbodiesel; 1.8 litre, 16 valve; 2.0 litre, 8 valve (which was also used in the Córdoba GTi); and a 2.0 litre, 16 valve. The top of the range engine delivers 150 PS (110 kW). The 2.0 litre ABF engine in this model was also used in the third-generation Golf GTi and the first Ibiza Cupra.

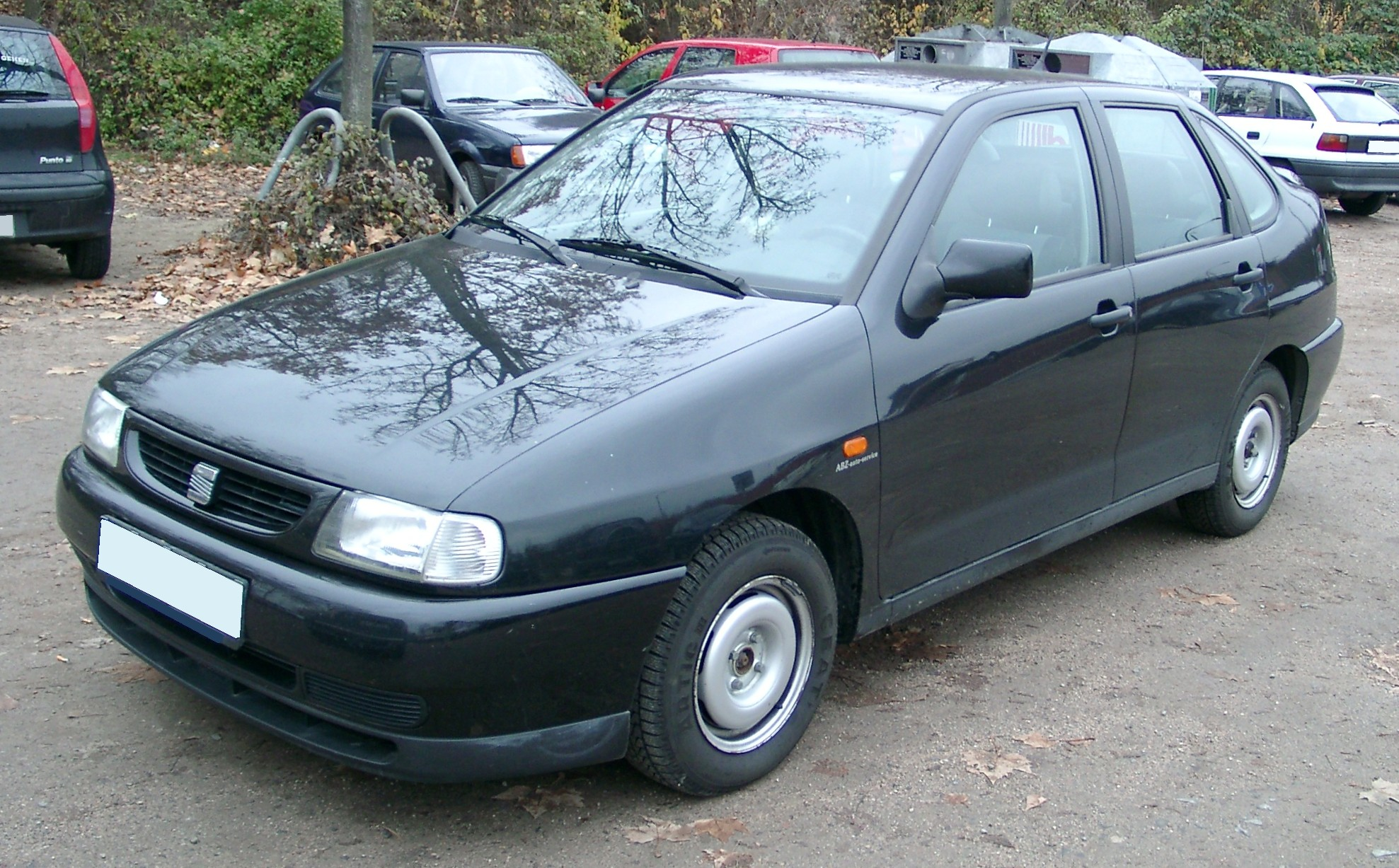
SEAT Córdoba facelift (1996–1999)

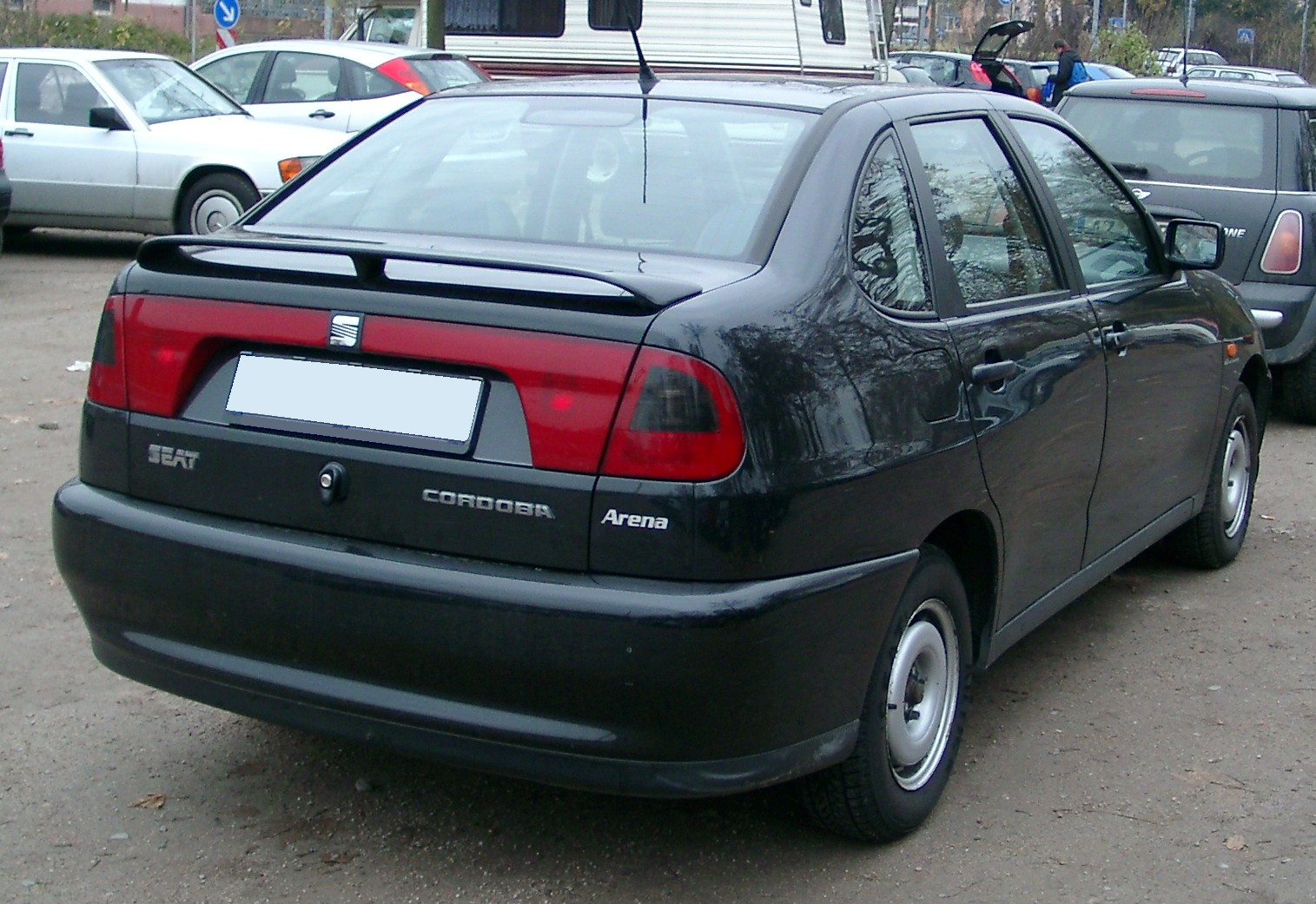
SEAT Córdoba facelift (1996–1999)

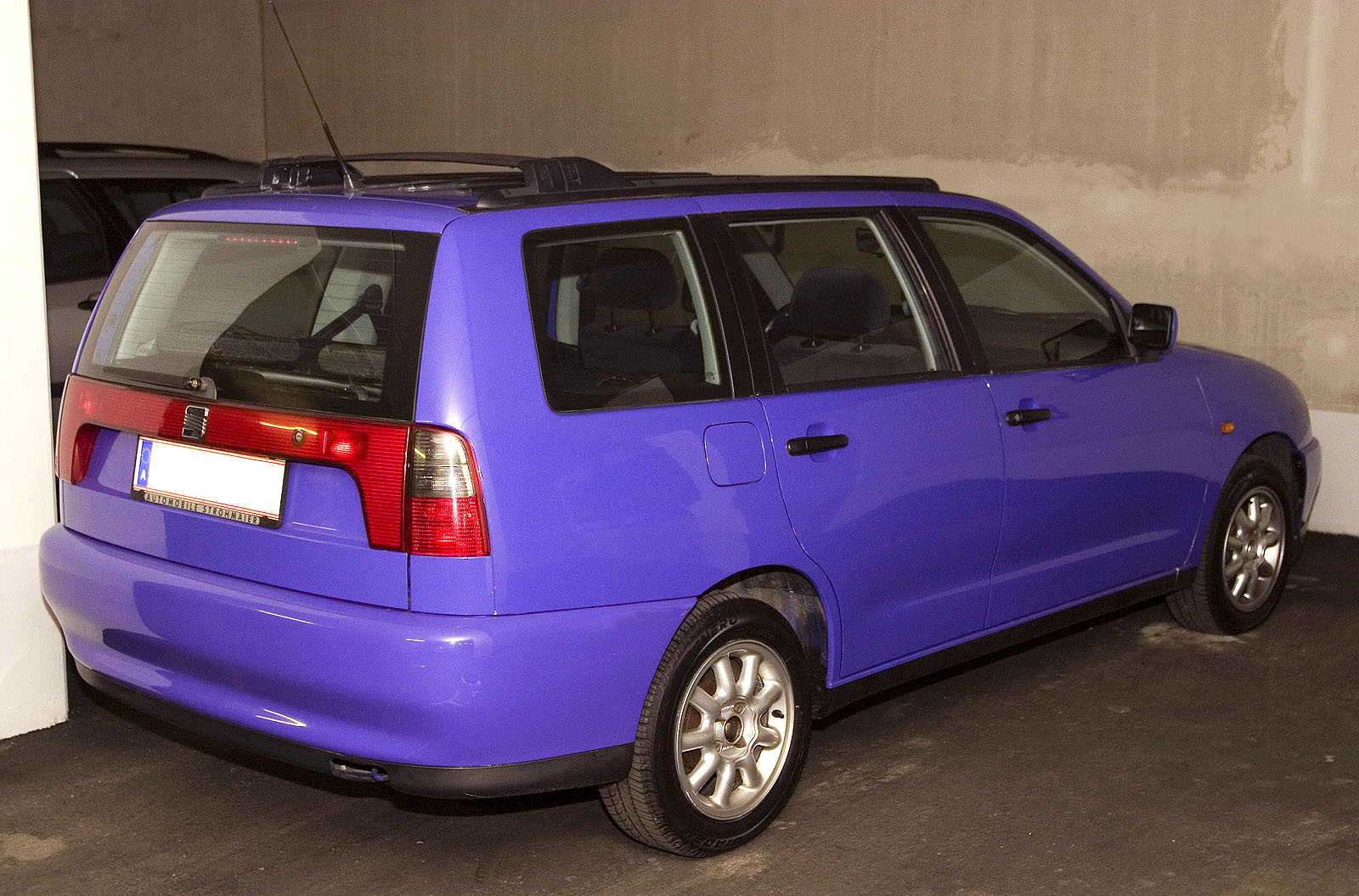
SEAT Córdoba Vario

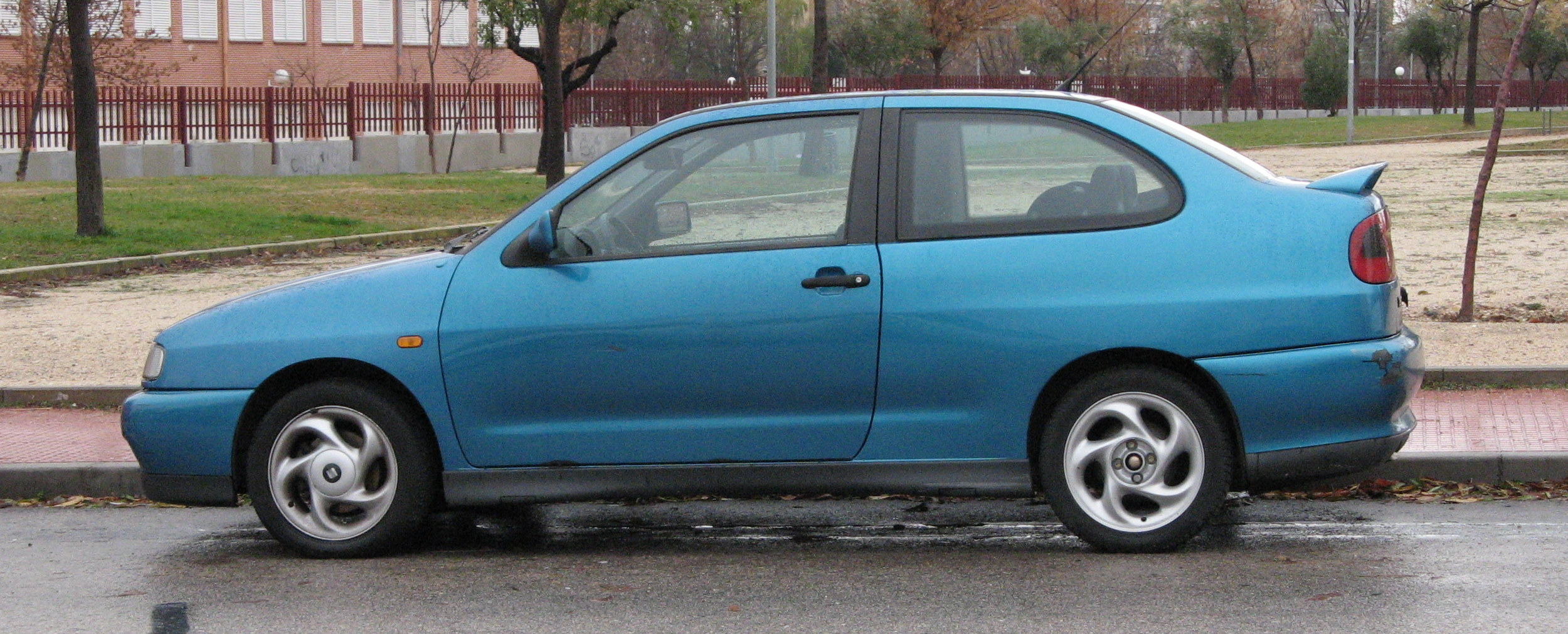
SEAT Córdoba SX Coupé

=== Facelift ===
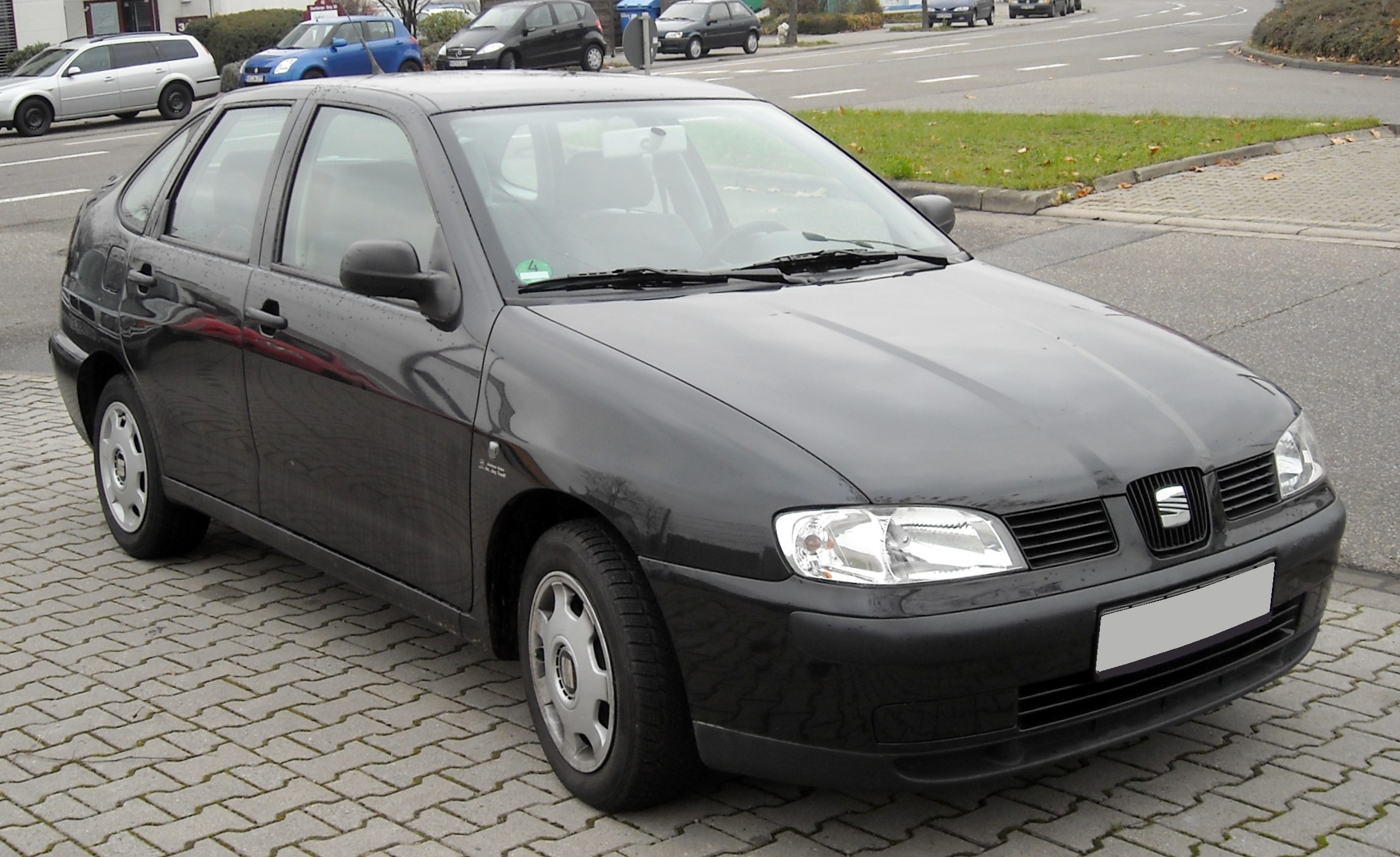
SEAT Córdoba 6K GP01 (1999–2002)

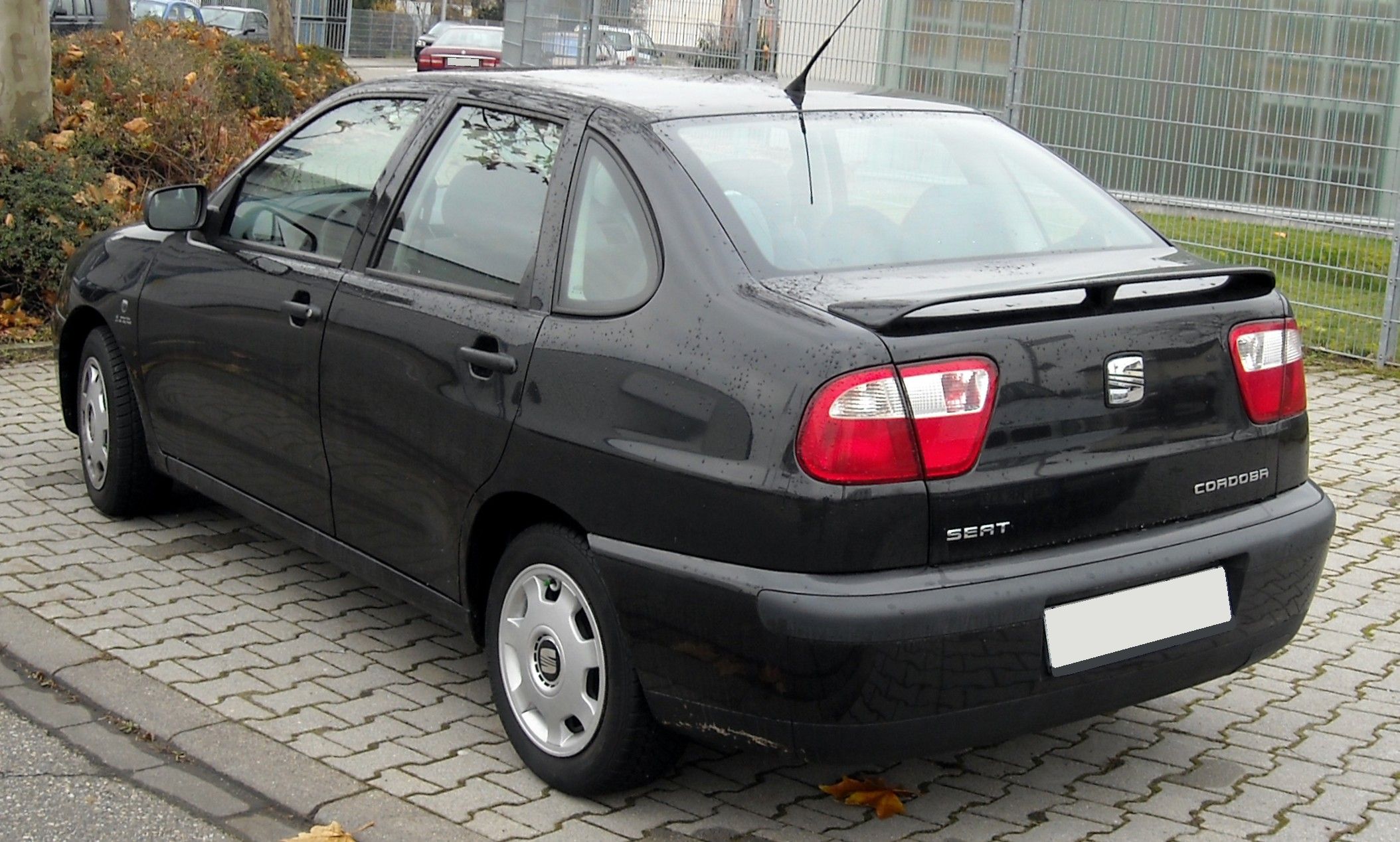
SEAT Córdoba 6K GP01 (1999–2002)

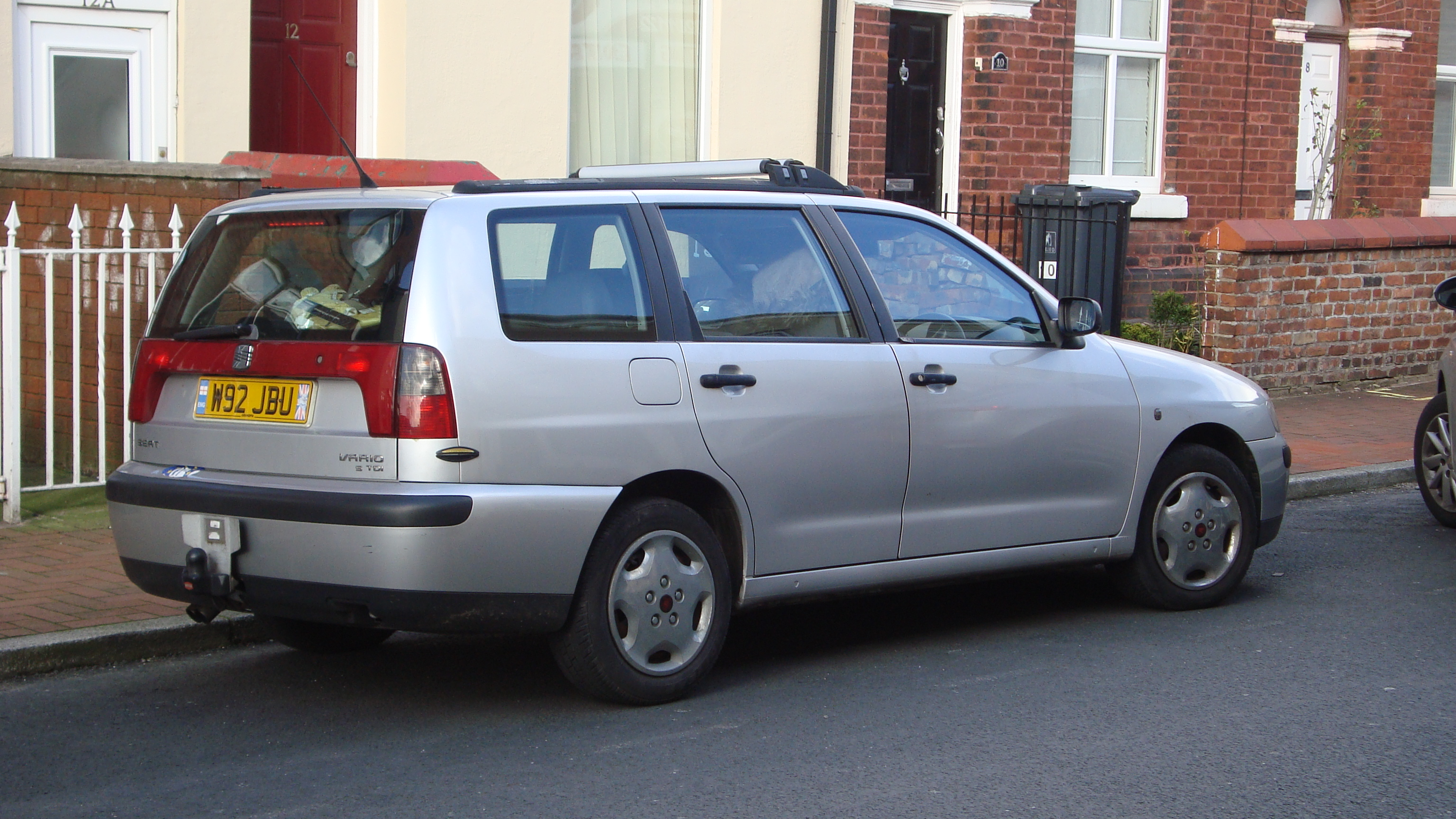
SEAT Córdoba Vario (1999-2002)

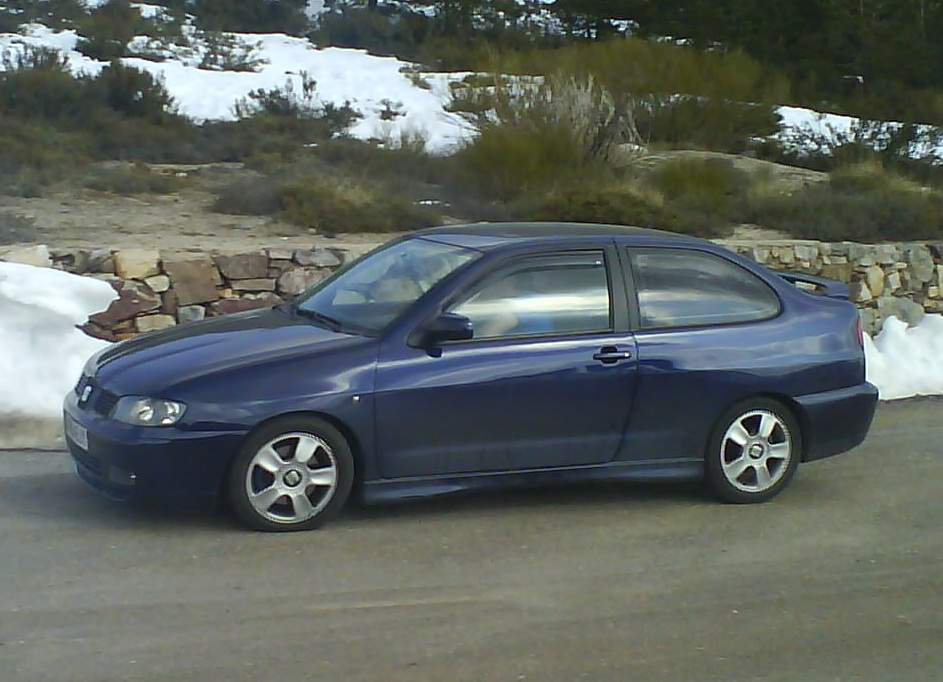
SEAT Córdoba SX (1999-2002)

The Córdoba was facelifted in 1999, with changes focusing on the bumpers, headlights, taillights and front grille, as well as in the interior, with new materials and upholstery. In the engine range, the 16-valve ABF engine was replaced with a 1.8-litre 156 PS (115 kW) turbocharged, 20-valve engine and joined the Cupra range.

The SX was no longer available in the United Kingdom, and limited numbers are known to exist in the Republic of Ireland in RHD format. The "Córdoba Vario" estate variant dropped the "Cordóba" and became simply the "Vario".

=== Motorsport ===
==== Rally ====
The Córdoba WRC was SEAT's rally car in the World Rally Championship from 1998 to 2000. It featured a 2.0-litre turbocharged engine and achieved a total of three podium finishes.

==== Rallycross ====
A Córdoba has also been used in the FIA World Rallycross Championship. Danish driver Dennis Rømer contested the 2014 World RX of Germany, finishing 40th out of 41 entrants in the heat stage. To date this is, and most likely will remain, the only time a Córdoba has been used in World Championship rallycross. However, the SEAT Ibiza has been used as a manufacturer entry.

=== Rebadged versions ===
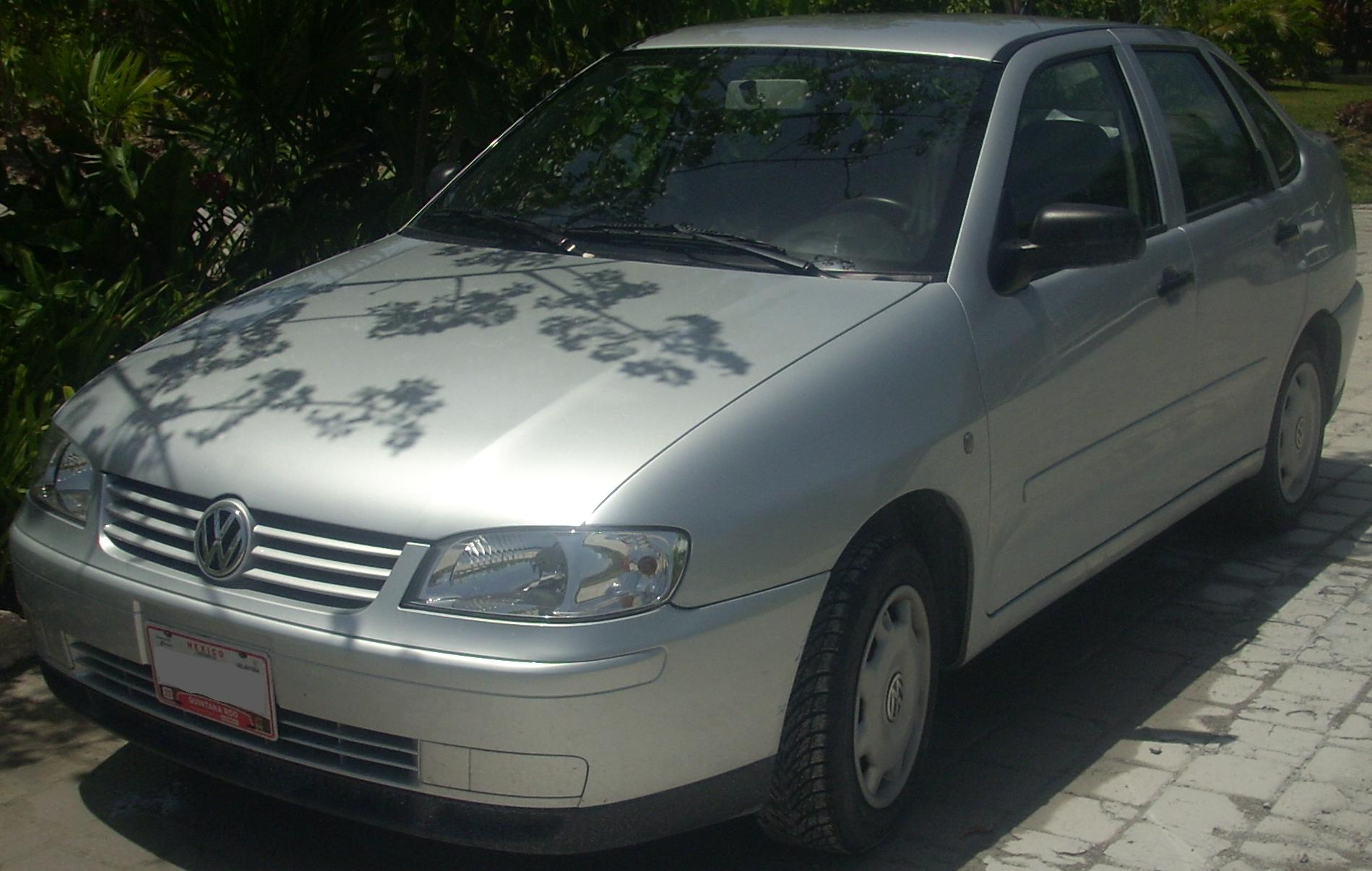
Volkswagen Derby, a rebadged SEAT Córdoba Mk1

The Córdobas's name was initially changed in Taiwan to SEAT Leon.

The contemporary Volkswagen Polo Classic (saloon) and estate variant were rebadged versions of the SEAT Córdoba Mk1 and Córdoba Vario respectively, and were not based on the Volkswagen Polo hatchback.

FAW-Volkswagen, Volkswagen's partner in China, manufactured the Córdoba Mk1 under the Volkswagen Citi Golf name between 1994 and 2001. The Citi Golf had the same exterior as the pre-facelift Córdoba and the 1.4-litre ABD engine was standard paired with a five-speed manual gearbox. When it was new in 1995, pricing was 240,000 yuan (US$35,640 - October 2020 exchange rate).

In Mexico it was rebadged as the Volkswagen Derby. In 1995, it was imported from Spain, but the 1996 model was assembled in the Volkswagen de México assembly plant in Puebla, Mexico. In 1998, the Spanish-made Polo Classic was introduced in Mexico as the new Volkswagen Derby.

The Volkswagen Polo Classic was also sold in the Philippines from 1996 to 1999, and in South Africa from 1996 to 2002. In South Africa, 24 units of a special edition called the Polo Classic Rainbow was made upon launch, which featured differently coloured body panels in a similar fashion to the Polo Harlequin.

=== Engines ===
Engine	Code	Type	Displacement	Max. power at rpm	Max. torque at rpm	Top speed	Years	Coupé	Saloon	Estate
Petrol engines (Typ 6K; 1992–1999)
1.4 i	ABD	I4 SOHC 8V	1,391 cc	60 PS (44 kW; 59 hp) at 5,200	107 N⋅m (79 lb⋅ft) at 2,400–2,800	145 km/h (90 mph)	1993–1995	✗	✓	✗
1.4 MPI	AEX/APQ	I4 SOHC 8V	1,390 cc	60 PS (44 kW; 59 hp) at 4,700	116 N⋅m (86 lb⋅ft) at 2,800–3,200	145 km/h (90 mph)	1995–1999	✓	✓	✓
1.4 MPI	AFH	I4 DOHC 16V	1,390 cc	100 PS (74 kW; 99 hp) at 6,000	128 N⋅m (94 lb⋅ft) at 4,400	165 km/h (103 mph)	1996–1999	✓	✓	✓
1.6 i	ABU	I4 SOHC 8V	1,598 cc	75 PS (55 kW; 74 hp) at 5,200	125 N⋅m (92 lb⋅ft) at 3,400	155 km/h (96 mph)	1993–1994	✗	✓	✗
1.6 i	1F	I4 SOHC 8V	1,595 cc	75 PS (55 kW; 74 hp) at 5,500	125 N⋅m (92 lb⋅ft) at 2,600	155 km/h (96 mph)	1994–1997	✓	✓	✗
1.6 MPI	AEE	I4 SOHC 8V	1,598 cc	75 PS (55 kW; 74 hp) at 4,800	135 N⋅m (100 lb⋅ft) at 2,800–3,600	155 km/h (96 mph)	1997–1999	✓	✓	✓
1.6 MPI	AFT	I4 DOHC 16V	1,595 cc	101 PS (74 kW; 100 hp) at 5,800	140 N⋅m (103 lb⋅ft) at 3,500	165 km/h (103 mph)	1996–1999	✓	✓	✓
1.8 i	ABS/ADZ/ACC	I4 SOHC 8V	1,781 cc	90 PS (66 kW; 89 hp) at 5,500	145 N⋅m (107 lb⋅ft) at 2,700–2,900	186 km/h (116 mph)	1993–1996	✓	✓	✗
1.8 MPI	ADL	I4 DOHC 16V	1,781 cc	129 PS (95 kW; 127 hp) at 6,000	165 N⋅m (122 lb⋅ft) at 4,800	195 km/h (121 mph)	1994–1996	✓	✓	✗
2.0 MPI	2E/AGG	I4 SOHC 8V	1,984 cc	115 PS (85 kW; 113 hp) at 5,400	165 N⋅m (122 lb⋅ft) at 3,200 (2E)/2,600 (AGG)	185 km/h (115 mph)	1993–1999	✓	✓	✗
2.0 MPI	ABF	I4 DOHC 16V	1,984 cc	150 PS (110 kW; 148 hp) at 6,000	180 N⋅m (133 lb⋅ft) at 4,200–5,000	210 km/h (130 mph)	1996–1999	✓	✓	✗
Petrol engines (Typ 6K2; 1999–2002)
1.0 MPI	ALD/ANV/AUC	I4 SOHC 8V	999 cc	50 PS (37 kW; 49 hp) at 5,000	86 N⋅m (63 lb⋅ft) at 3,000–3,600	145 km/h (90 mph)	08.1999–08.2002	✗	✓	✗
1.4 MPI	AKK/ANW/AUD	I4 SOHC 8V	1390 cc	60 PS (44 kW; 59 hp) at 4,700	116 N⋅m (86 lb⋅ft) at 3,500	157 km/h (98 mph)	08.1999–08.2002		✓	✓
1.4 MPI	APE/AUA	I4 DOHC 16V	1390 cc	75 PS (55 kW; 74 hp) at 5,000	128 N⋅m (94 lb⋅ft) at 3,300	170 km/h (106 mph)	08.1999–08.2002		✓	✓
1.4 MPI	AQQ/AUB	I4 DOHC 16V	1390 cc	100 PS (74 kW; 99 hp) at 6,000	128 N⋅m (94 lb⋅ft) at 4,500	188 km/h (117 mph)	05.2000–08.2002		✓	✗
1.6 MPI	ALM	I4 SOHC 8V	1598 cc	75 PS (55 kW; 74 hp) at 4,800	135 N⋅m (100 lb⋅ft) at 3,200	170 km/h (106 mph)	08.1999–04.2000		✓	✓
1.6 MPI	AEH/AKL/APF/AUR	I4 SOHC 8V	1595 cc	101 PS (74 kW; 100 hp) at 5,600	145 N⋅m (107 lb⋅ft) at 3,800	194 km/h (121 mph)	08.1999–08.2002		✓	✓
20VT, 1.8T Cupra	AQX/AYP	I4 DOHC 20V turbo	1781 cc	156 PS (115 kW; 154 hp) at 5,800	210 N⋅m (155 lb⋅ft) at 2,000	215 km/h (134 mph)	05.2000–08.2002	✓	✗	✗
Diesel engines (Typ 6K; 1992–1999)
1.9 D	1Y	I4 SOHC 8V	1,896 cc	64 PS (47 kW; 63 hp) at 4,400	124 N⋅m (91 lb⋅ft) at 2,000–3,000	150 km/h (93.2 mph)	1993–1999	✓	✓	✗
1.9 TD	AAZ	I4 SOHC 8V	1,896 cc	75 PS (55 kW; 74 hp) at 4,200	150 N⋅m (111 lb⋅ft) at 2,400–3,400	155 km/h (96.3 mph)	1993–1996	✓	✓	✗
1.9 SDI	AEY	I4 SOHC 8V	1,896 cc	64 PS (47 kW; 63 hp) at 4,200	125 N⋅m (92 lb⋅ft) at 2,200–2,800	150 km/h (93.2 mph)	1996–1999	✓	✓	✓
1.9 TDI	1Z/AHU	I4 SOHC 8V	1,896 cc	90 PS (66 kW; 89 hp) at 4,000	202 N⋅m (149 lb⋅ft) at 1,900	160 km/h (99.4 mph)	1996–1999	✓	✓	✓
1.9 TDI	AFN/AVG	I4 SOHC 8V	1,896 cc	110 PS (81 kW; 108 hp) at 4,150	235 N⋅m (173 lb⋅ft) at 1,900	193 km/h (119.9 mph)	1996–1999	✓	✓	✓
Diesel engines (Typ 6K2; 1999–2002)
1.9 SDI	AGP/AQM	I4 SOHC 8V	1,896 cc	68 PS (50 kW; 67 hp) at 4,200	133 N⋅m (98 lb⋅ft) at 2,200–2,600	161 km/h (100.0 mph)	08.1999–08.2002	✓	✓	✓
1.9 TDI	AGR/ALH	I4 SOHC 8V	1,896 cc	90 PS (66 kW; 89 hp) at 4,000/3,750	210 N⋅m (155 lb⋅ft) at 1,900	180 km/h (111.8 mph)	08.1999–08.2002	✓	✓	✓
1.9 TDI	ASK/ASV	I4 SOHC 8V	1,896 cc	110 PS (81 kW; 108 hp) at 4,150	235 N⋅m (173 lb⋅ft) at 1,900	193 km/h (119.9 mph)	08.1999–08.2002	✓	✓	✓

== Second generation (Typ 6L; 2002) ==
Second generation (6L)
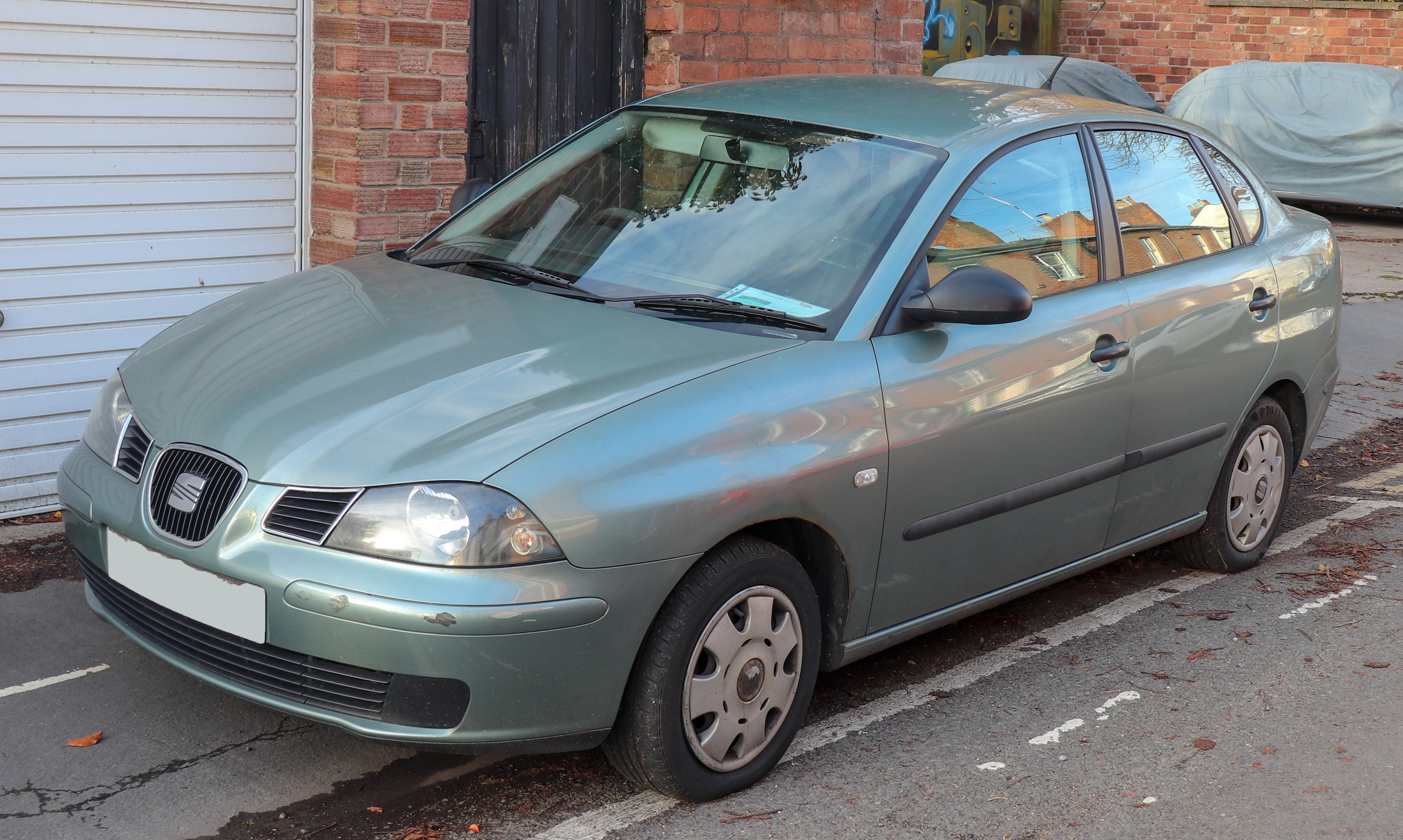

Overview
- Production: 2002–2008
- Assembly: Spain: Martorell, Catalonia
- Designer: Walter de Silva

Body and chassis
- Body style: 4-door saloon
- Platform: Volkswagen Group A04 (PQ24)
- Related: SEAT Ibiza Mk3; Volkswagen Polo Mk4; Škoda Fabia Mk1; Škoda Fabia Mk2

Powertrain
- Engine: petrol: 1.2 L 12v I3; 1.4 L 16v I4; 1.6 L I4; 1.6 L 16v I4; 2.0 L I4; diesel: 1.4 L TDI I3; 1.9 L SDI I4; 1.9 L TDI I4

Dimensions
- Wheelbase: 2,460 mm (96.9 in)
- Length: 4,280 mm (168.5 in)
- Width: 1,698 mm (66.9 in)
- Height: 1,441 mm (56.7 in)
- Curb weight: 1,260 kg (2,780 lb)

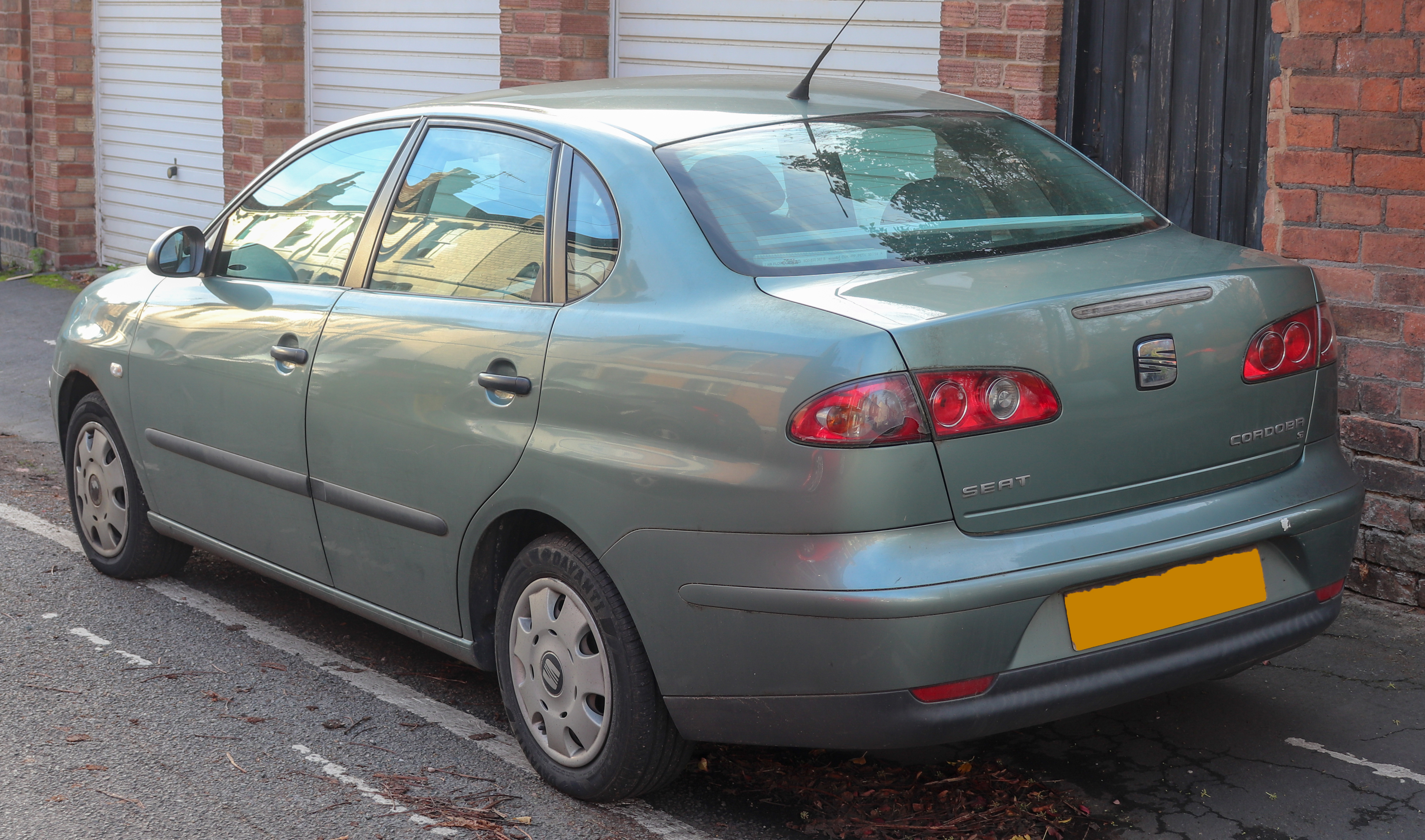
Seat Córdoba (6L)

The second-generation Córdoba was presented at the 2002 Paris Motor Show as the four-door saloon version of the SEAT Ibiza Mk3 hatchback. It featured a boot capacity of 485 litres (17.1 cu ft), which could be increased to 800 litres (28 cu ft) by folding the rear seats. No estate or coupé versions of the second generation were developed.

The Córdoba Mark II shares its chassis and engines with the Volkswagen Polo Mk4 and Škoda Fabia Mk1 and Mk2.

In Mexico, Córdoba production continued for a moment longer at the Volkswagen de México Puebla assembly plant. It had the four-cylinder, 2.0-litre 85 kW (115 PS; 113 hp) engine combined with a five-speed manual or an optional six-speed Tiptronic transmission. For the 2007 model year, it was facelifted using the front bumper and interior from the facelifted Ibiza. The Córdoba was never facelifted outside of Mexico.

The Córdoba was withdrawn from sale in the UK in 2006. In other European countries, sales ended in 2009, after production had ceased in November 2008.

=== Engines ===
Model	Engine code	Max. power	Dates
Petrol engines
1.2 12V	AZQ/BME	47 kW (64 PS; 63 hp)	10/02–06/06
1.2 12V	BXV	51 kW (70 PS; 69 hp)	05/06–11/08
1.4 16V	BBY/BKY	55 kW (75 PS; 74 hp)	09/02–12/07
1.4 16V	BXW	63 kW (85 PS; 84 hp)	05/06–11/08
1.4 16V	BBZ	74 kW (100 PS; 99 hp)	10/02–11/08
1.6 8V	BAH	74 kW (100 PS; 99 hp)	04/03–11/08
1.6 16V	BTS	77 kW (105 PS; 104 hp)	11/06–11/08
2.0 8V	AZL/BBX	85 kW (115 PS; 113 hp)	09/02–11/08
Diesel engines
1.4 TDI	BNM	51 kW (70 PS; 69 hp)	05/05–11/08
1.4 TDI	AMF	55 kW (75 PS; 74 hp)	10/02–12/05
1.4 TDI	BMS/BNV	59 kW (80 PS; 79 hp)	05/05–11/08
1.9 SDI	ASY	47 kW (64 PS; 63 hp)	09/02–12/05
1.9 TDI	ATD/AXR/BMT	74 kW (100 PS; 99 hp)	09/02–11/08
1.9 TDI	ASZ/BLT	96 kW (130 PS; 128 hp)	10/02–07/08

== Sales and production figures ==
The total production per year of SEAT Córdoba cars, manufactured in SEAT and other Volkswagen group's plants, is shown below:

Model	1998	1999	2000	2001	2002	2003	2004	2005	2006	2007	2008	2009
Total annual production	108,749	111,894	97,685	78,770	58,646	59,348	46,821	37,568	31,058	29,747	20,439	4,861

A total of 1,034,465 Córdobas have been produced.
