= Volkswagen EA827 engine =

Family of petrol engines

Volkswagen EA827 (EA113)
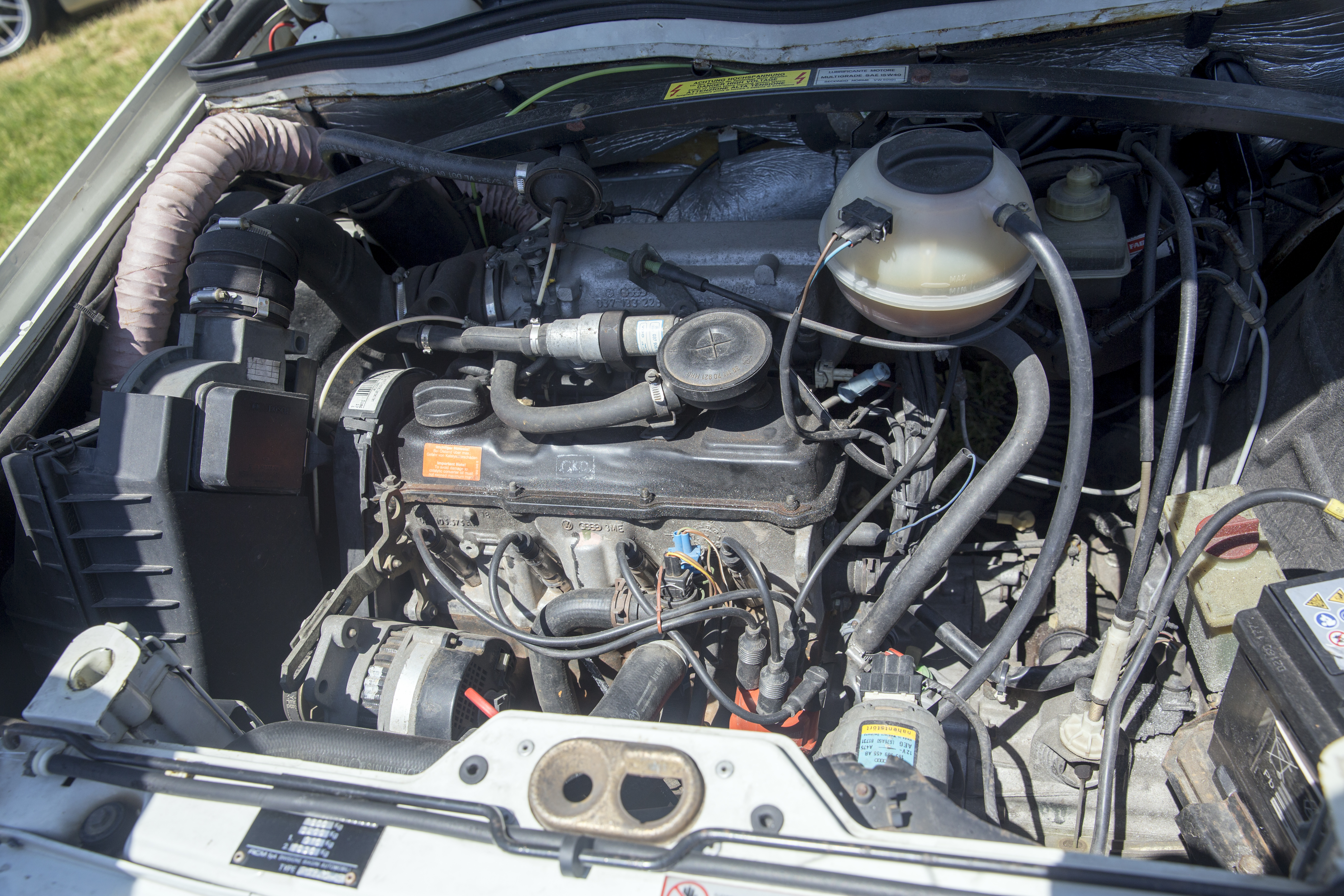

Overview
- Manufacturer: Volkswagen Group
- Production: 1972–2013

Layout
- Configuration: Inline-4
- Displacement: 1,297–1,984 cc (1.3–2.0 L; 79.1–121.1 cu in)
- Cylinder bore: 75–82.5 mm (3.0–3.2 in)
- Piston stroke: 73.4–92.8 mm (2.89–3.65 in)
- Cylinder block material: Gray cast iron
- Cylinder head material: Cast aluminium alloy
- Valvetrain: 2-, 4-, or 5-valve valves per cylinder, hydraulic valve lifters, belt-driven as single overhead camshaft (SOHC) or dual overhead camshaft (DOHC)
- Compression ratio: 8.0:1-10.5:1

Combustion
- Fuel system: Carburetor or electronic fuel injection
- Management: Bosch Motronic or Siemens Simos electronic engine control unit (ECU)
- Fuel type: Petrol
- Oil system: Wet sump
- Cooling system: Water-cooled

Output
- Power output: 40–155 kW (54–211 PS; 54–208 bhp)
- Torque output: 144–280 N⋅m (106–207 lb⋅ft)

Dimensions
- Dry weight: ~ 110 kg (243 lb)

The EA827 family of petrol engines was initially developed by Audi under Ludwig Kraus's leadership. Introduced with the B1-series Audi 80 in 1972, it went on to power many Volkswagen Group models, with later derivatives of the engine still in production into the 2010s. This is a very robust water-cooled engine configuration for four- up to eight- cylinders. In Brazil, this engine was produced under the name Volkswagen AP AP (Alta Performance, "high performance"). One defining characteristic of the EA827 was that the auxiliaries were all powered from an intermediate shaft off of the timing belt; this was because longer rubber belts were not a reliable option at the time the engine was originally designed.

There was also a range of EA827 diesel engines, sharing the 88-millimetre (3.46 in) cylinder spacing with the spark ignition petrol engines. An evolution of the EA827 engine called the EA113 appeared in 1995 and gradually replaced the earlier version. The new model eschews the intermediate shaft, has a toothed belt driven water pump, a distributorless ignition system, and uses a crossflow cylinder head.

== 1.3 ==
configuration
1,297 cc (78 cu in) inline-four, bore and stroke 75.0 mm × 73.4 mm (2.95 in × 2.89 in)
head
SOHC two valves per cylinder
block
grey cast iron, five bearings
output
44 kW (60 PS; 59 hp) at 5,500 rpm, 100 N⋅m (74 lb⋅ft) at 3,200 rpm
fuel
carburettor
application
Audi 80, Volkswagen Passat (B2)

== 1.4 ==
configuration
1,423 cc inline-four, bore and stroke 76.5 mm × 77.4 mm (3.01 in × 3.05 in)
head
SOHC 2-valve per cylinder, 10:1 compression
block
cast iron, five bearings
output
62 kW (84 PS; 83 hp) at 5,500 rpm, 118 N⋅m (87 lb⋅ft) at 4,200 rpm
fuel
electronic injection [SPI] or carburettor
aspiration
cast aluminum intake manifold, cast iron exhaust manifold
application
Volkswagen Citi Golf and Volkswagen Polo Variant (South Africa).

== 1.5 ==
configuration
1,457 cc (89 cu in) inline-four, bore and stroke 79.5 mm × 73.4 mm (3.13 in × 2.89 in)
head
SOHC 2-valve per cylinder
block
grey cast iron, five bearings
output (70PS)
51 kW (70 PS; 69 hp) at 5,600 rpm, 121 N⋅m (89 lb⋅ft) at 2,800 rpm
output (85PS)
63 kW (86 PS; 84 hp) at 5,600 rpm, 125 N⋅m (92 lb⋅ft) at 3,200 rpm
fuel
carburettor
application (70PS)
Volkswagen Golf, Audi 80, Volkswagen Passat, Volkswagen Scirocco, Volkswagen Jetta
85PS: Volkswagen Golf, Audi 80, Volkswagen Passat

== 1.6 (1588 cc) ==
configuration
1588 cc (96 cu in) inline 4, bore and stroke 79.5 mm × 80.0 mm (3.13 in × 3.15 in)
head
SOHC 2-valve per cylinder
block
grey cast iron, five bearings
output
63 kW (85 PS; 84 hp) at 5600 rpm, 125 N⋅m (92 lb⋅ft) at 2800 rpm
output (GTI)
81 kW (110 PS; 108 hp) at 5800 rpm, 150 N⋅m (111 lb⋅ft) at 4000 rpm
fuel
carburettor, K-Jetronic fuel injection
application
Volkswagen Golf GTI, Volkswagen Scirocco GTI, Audi 80, Volkswagen Passat

== 1.6 (1595 cc) ==
configuration
1595 cc (97 cu in) inline 4, bore and stroke 81.0 mm × 77.4 mm (3.19 in × 3.05 in), 1.05 stroke ratio
head
SOHC 2-valve per cylinder
block
grey cast iron, five bearings
output

Output	Torque	Engine code	Applications
51 kW (70 PS; 69 hp) /5200 rpm	125 N⋅m (92 lb⋅ft) /2800 rpm	PN; PP	Audi 80, Volkswagen Golf Mk II, Volkswagen Passat (B2), Volkswagen Santana (B2)
74 kW (101 PS; 100 hp) /5800 rpm	135 N⋅m (100 lb⋅ft) /4400 rpm	AEK	Volkswagen Golf Mk III, Volkswagen Vento, Volkswagen Passat B4
74 kW (101 PS; 100 hp) /5800 rpm	140 N⋅m (103 lb⋅ft) /3500 rpm	AFT	Volkswagen Golf Mk III, Volkswagen Vento, Volkswagen Passat B4, SEAT Ibiza Mk II, Seat Córdoba Mk II, Seat Toledo Mk I
74 kW (100 PS; 99 hp) /5300 rpm	140 N⋅m (103 lb⋅ft) /3800 rpm	ADP; AHL	Audi A4 B5, Volkswagen Passat B5
74 kW (101 PS; 100 hp) /5600 rpm	145 N⋅m (107 lb⋅ft) /3800 rpm	AEH; AKL; APF; AUR	Audi A3 Mk I, Audi A4 B5, Volkswagen Polo Mk III Classic/Variant, Volkswagen Golf Mk IV, Volkswagen Bora, Volkswagen Passat B5, Volkswagen New Beetle, Škoda Octavia, SEAT Ibiza Mk I, Seat Córdoba Mk I, Seat Toledo Mk II
75 kW (102 PS; 101 hp) /5600 rpm	148 N⋅m (109 lb⋅ft) /3800 rpm	AYD; AWH; AVU; ALZ; BFQ; BFS; BGU; BSE; BSF; AFX	Audi A3, Audi A4 B5-B7, Seat León Mk II, SEAT Altea, Seat Toledo Mk III, Škoda Octavia Mk I/II, Volkswagen Golf Mk IV/V/VI, Volkswagen Bora/Jetta, Volkswagen New Beetle, Volkswagen Passat B5/B6, Citi Golf 1.6i and variants

fuel
Ecotronic carburettor, KE-Jetronic, Simos AFX has VWSA Bosch MP9 injection
aspiration
cast aluminum intake manifold, plastic variable length intake manifold, cast iron exhaust manifold

== 1.7 ==
A 1,715 cc engine, originally used in the German Volkswagen Iltis, was also used mainly in the US market Sciroccos, Rabbits and Jettas but also in the Audi 4000 B2. It was built in Volkswagen of America's plant in New Stanton, Pennsylvania. This engine was also used in the Dodge Omni/Plymouth Horizon family of cars from 1978 until 1983. Power ranged from 63 to 75 hp (47 to 56 kW) in the Chrysler applications. Audi's first five-cylinder, petrol engine, the 2.1-litre EA828, was a 1.7 with one extra cylinder - although the EA828 made do without the complexity and weight of the intermediate shaft.

configuration
1,715 cc (104.7 cu in) inline-four, bore and stroke 79.5 mm × 86.4 mm (3.13 in × 3.40 in).

== 1.8 ==
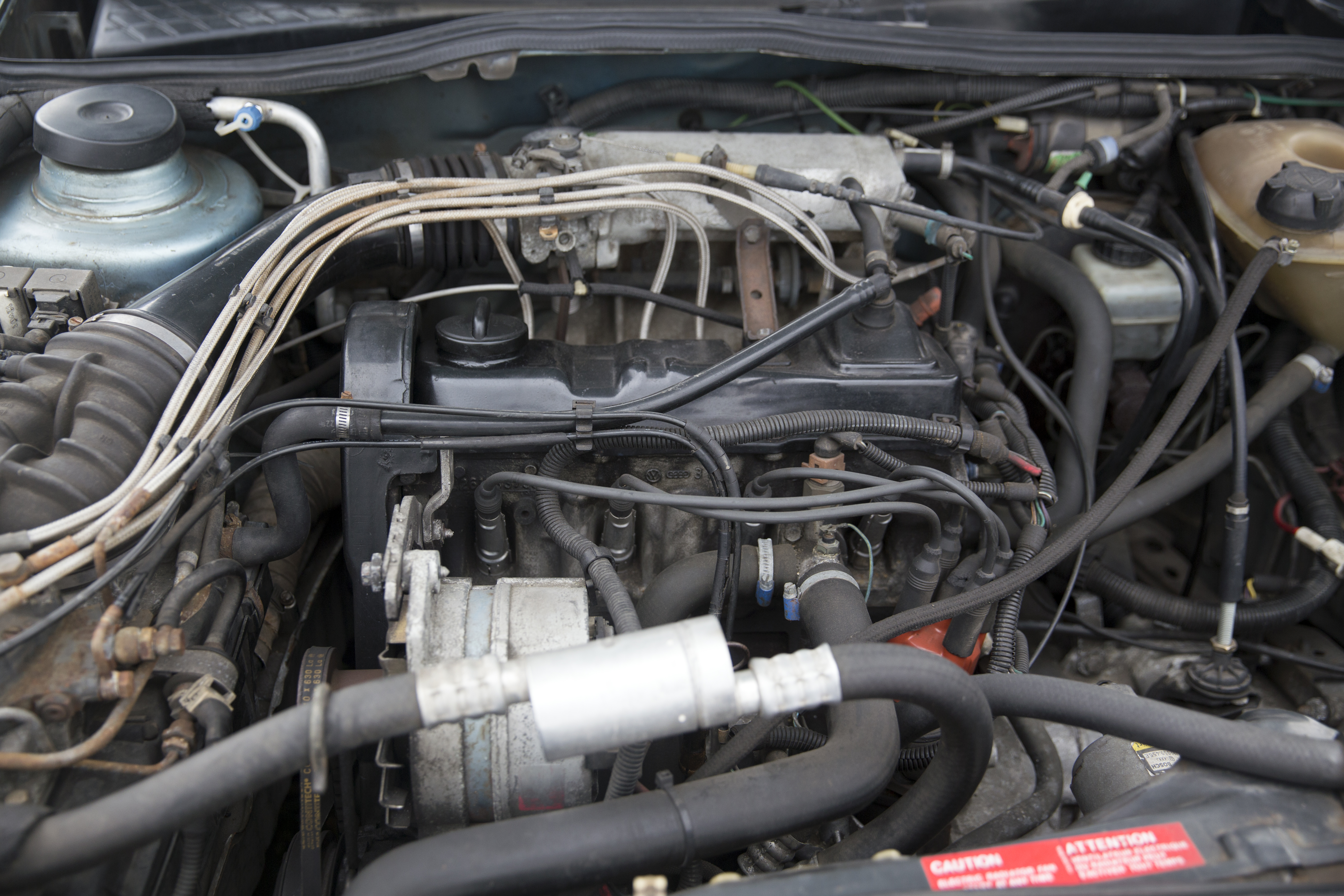
An 85 hp 1.8-liter GX engine mounted in a 1985 Volkswagen Golf II

configuration
1781 cc inline 4, : bore /stroke 81/ 86.4 mm
head
SOHC 2-valve per cylinder
block
grey cast iron, five main bearings
fuel
carburettor, K/KE-Jetronic, mono-Motronic, mono-jetronic, CIS, CIS E, Digifant I, Digifant II
output

Output	Torque	Compression	Engine code
55 kW (75 PS; 74 hp) at 5000 rpm	140 N⋅m (103 lb⋅ft) at 2500 rpm	9.0:1	AAM; ANN
63 kW (85 PS; 84 hp) at 5200 rpm	133 N⋅m (98 lb⋅ft) at 3000 rpm	8.5:1	GX
66 kW (90 PS; 89 hp) at 5400 rpm	142 N⋅m (105 lb⋅ft) at 2600 rpm	9.0:1	RP
66 kW (90 PS; 89 hp) at 5500 rpm	145 N⋅m (107 lb⋅ft) at 2500 rpm	10.0:1	ABS; ADZ; ANP
67 kW (91 PS; 90 hp) at 5500 rpm	142 N⋅m (105 lb⋅ft) at 3250 rpm	8.5:1	JH
72 kW (98 PS; 97 hp) at 5400 rpm	142 N⋅m (105 lb⋅ft) at 3000 rpm	10.0:1	2H
75 kW (102 PS; 101 hp) at 5250 rpm	149 N⋅m (110 lb⋅ft) at 3250 rpm	10.0:1	RD
82 kW (112 PS; 110 hp) at 5800 rpm	154 N⋅m (114 lb⋅ft) at 3500 rpm	10.0:1	PB; EV; KT; JJ; DX; DZ

applications
Audi 80, Audi 100, Volkswagen Cabriolet, VW Golf/Rabbit, Volkswagen Passat, Volkswagen Jetta

== 1.8 16V ==
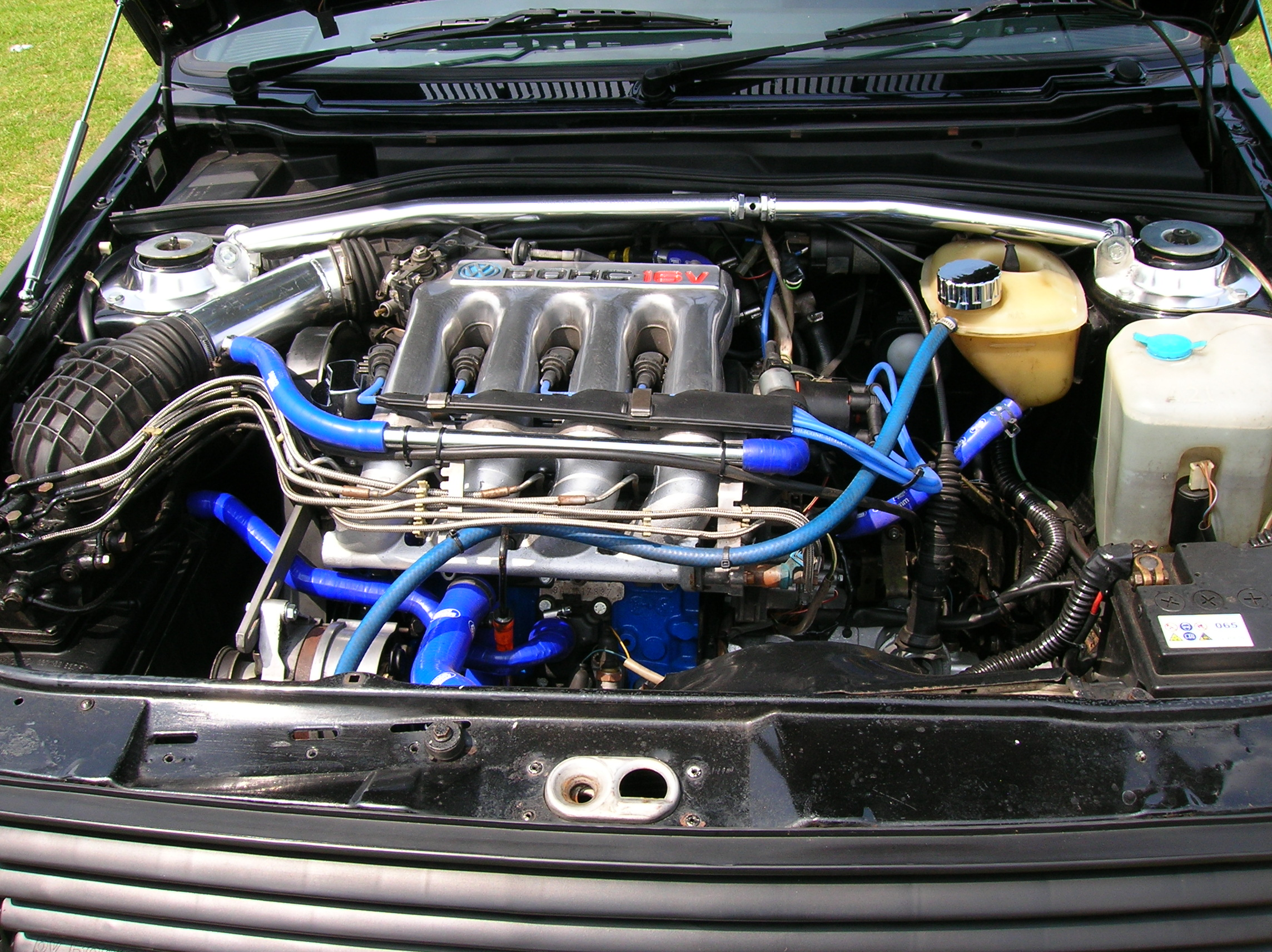
VW Golf 16v engine.

configuration
1781 cc inline 4, : bore / stroke 81.0 / 86.4 mm
head
DOHC 4-valve per cylinder
block
grey cast iron, five bearings
fuel
K/KE-Jetronic
output
94 kW (128 PS; 126 hp) in SEAT Toledo MY 1992–1995, : - USDM Market - VW Scirocco (PL) 1986.5 - 1988 (1989)
95 kW (129 PS; 127 hp) in SEAT Ibiza, SEAT Córdoba - ADL
- European Market - VW Scirocco (PL) 1990 - 1992 - Catalyst
102 kW (139 PS; 137 hp) in Volkswagen Golf, Volkswagen Jetta, Volkswagen Corrado
- European Market - VW Scirocco (KR) 1986 - 1990 - Non-Catalyst
application
Volkswagen Golf, Volkswagen Scirocco, SEAT Ibiza, SEAT Córdoba, SEAT Toledo, Volkswagen Jetta, Volkswagen Passat, Volkswagen Corrado

== 1.9E ==
Thanks to improvements in casting technique, Volkswagen was once again able to expand the bore for this "1.9"-litre version. The cylinder walls are only 5.5 mm (0.22 in) thick. ID-code SD.

configuration
1847 cc inline 4, : bore / stroke 82.5 / 86.4 mm
head
SOHC 2-valve per cylinder, 10,5: 1 compression ratio
block
grey cast iron, five bearings
fuel
KE-Jetronic
output
83 kW (113 PS; 111 hp) at 5600 rpm, 160 N⋅m (118 lb⋅ft) at 3400 rpm
application
Audi 80, Audi 100

== 2.0 ==
engine displacement & engine configuration
1,984 cc (121.1 cu in) straight-four engine (R4/I4); bore x stroke: 82.5 mm × 92.8 mm (3.25 in × 3.65 in), stroke ratio: 0.89:1 - undersquare/long-stroke, 496.1 cc per cylinder, compression ratio: 10.0-10.5:1
cylinder block & crankcase
CG25 grey cast iron; five main bearings; die–forged steel crankshaft, forged steel connecting rods
cylinder head & valvetrain
cast aluminium alloy; two valves per cylinder, 8 valves total, hydraulic bucket tappets, timing belt-driven one-piece cast single overhead camshaft (SOHC)
aspiration
cast aluminium alloy intake manifold
engine management
Bosch Motronic or Siemens Simos electronic engine control unit (ECU)
EWG-rated motive power & torque outputs, application, ID codes
37 kW (50 PS; 49 hp) at 2,800 rpm; 140 N⋅m (103 lb⋅ft) at 2,100-2,400 rpm — Volkswagen Industrial Motor multi-fuel (petrol / LPG / CNG) - CBS (08/06->)
43 kW (58 PS; 57 hp) at 2,800 rpm; 143 N⋅m (105 lb⋅ft) at 2,100-2,400 rpm — Volkswagen Industrial Motor multi-fuel (petrol / LPG / CNG) - BEF (04/02->)
DIN-rated motive power & torque outputs, ID codes
80 kW (109 PS; 108 hp) at 5,400 rpm; 160 N⋅m (118 lb⋅ft) at 3,500 rpm — Ecofuel (bivalent) (CNG) Touran, Caddy, Transporter/Caravelle - BSX
85 kW (115 PS; 113 hp) at 5,400 rpm; 165 N⋅m (122 lb⋅ft) at 3,200 rpm — AWG, AWF
85 kW (115 PS; 113 hp) at 5,400 rpm; 166 N⋅m (122 lb⋅ft) at 2,600 rpm — AGG
85 kW (115 PS; 113 hp) at 5,400 rpm; 166 N⋅m (122 lb⋅ft) at 3,200 rpm — 2E, ADY, ABA
85 kW (115 PS; 113 hp) at 5,200 rpm; 170 N⋅m (125 lb⋅ft) at 2,400 rpm — APK, AQY
85 kW (115 PS; 113 hp) at 5,200 rpm; 170 N⋅m (125 lb⋅ft) at 2,600 rpm — ATM
85 kW (115 PS; 113 hp) at 5,200 rpm; 170 N⋅m (125 lb⋅ft) at 2,700-4,700 rpm — AXA
85 kW (115 PS; 113 hp) at 5,400 rpm; 172 N⋅m (127 lb⋅ft) at 3,200 rpm — AZH, AZJ
85 kW (115 PS; 113 hp) at 5,400 rpm; 172 N⋅m (127 lb⋅ft) at 3,500 rpm — AZM
88 kW (120 PS; 118 hp) at 5,600 rpm; 174 N⋅m (128 lb⋅ft) at 2,400 rpm — ATF
88 kW (120 PS; 118 hp) at 5,600 rpm; 175 N⋅m (129 lb⋅ft) at 2,600 rpm — AUZ, ASU, AVA
applications
SEAT Ibiza Mk2 & Mk3, SEAT Córdoba, SEAT Toledo Mk1, SEAT Alhambra, Škoda Fabia Mk1 (6Y), Škoda Octavia Mk1 (1U), Škoda Superb Mk1 (3U), Volkswagen Santana, Volkswagen Polo Mk4, Volkswagen Golf Mk3, Volkswagen Golf Mk4, Volkswagen Vento, Volkswagen Bora, Volkswagen Jetta, Volkswagen New Beetle, Volkswagen Passat B3, Volkswagen Passat B4, Volkswagen Passat B5, Volkswagen Sharan (7M), Volkswagen Transporter (T5), Volkswagen Industrial Motor, Audi 80, Audi 100
This engine was neither assembled in the Porsche 924 nor in the AMC Gremlin, their respective engines being based on the 2.0 EA831 engine).

== 2.0 16V ==
Configuration
1,984 cc inline 4 (121 cu in)
Cylinders
bore × stroke 82.5 × 92.8 mm (0.89), 496 cc/cylinder, 10.5:1 compression ratio
Block
grey cast iron, five bearings
Head
DOHC 4-valve per cylinder
Fuel
KE-Motronic ("CIS-E Motronic"), Digifant
Aspiration
long overhead cast aluminium intake manifold
output
100 kW (136 PS; 134 hp), 180 N⋅m (133 lb⋅ft) VW Passat B3 16V VW Jetta, Golf MKII, Golf MKIII, VW Corrado 16V
output
103 kW (140 PS; 138 hp), 181 N⋅m (133 lb⋅ft) Audi 80/100 for some European markets
output
110 kW (150 PS; 148 hp) at 6000 rpm, 180 N⋅m (133 lb⋅ft) at 4800 rpm VW Golf III GTI 16V, VW Passat B4 16V
application
Volkswagen Golf GTI, Volkswagen Passat, Audi 100, SEAT Córdoba Mk1 (ABF), SEAT Ibiza Mk2, SEAT Toledo Mk1, Volkswagen Jetta GLI, GTX, Golf GTI 16V, MK-II 1996-1999 146 PS, MK-III 2000 153 PS (Brazil), Parati GTI 16V (Brazil)

== 1.8 G60 ==
configuration
1781 cc inline 4, : bore /stroke 81 x 86.4 mm
1763 cc inline 4, : bore /stroke 80.6 x 86.4 mm
head
SOHC 2-valve per cylinder, 8.0:1 compression ratio
DOHC 4-valves per cylinder, 8,5:1 compression ratio
block
Code PG: grey cast iron, five bearings
fuel
Bosch

aspiration
belt-driven G-Charger with intercooler

output
118 kW (160 PS; 158 hp) at 5800 rpm, 225 N⋅m (166 lb⋅ft) at 3800 rpm — PG
118 kW (160 PS; 158 hp) at 5800 rpm, 225 N⋅m (166 lb⋅ft) at 3800 rpm — 1H (Golf Rallye, 1763 cc)
154 kW (210 PS; 207 hp) at 5500 rpm, 280 N⋅m (207 lb⋅ft) at 4200 rpm — 3G (Golf Limited, DOHC 16V)

application
Volkswagen Golf Mk2 G60/Rallye/Limited, Volkswagen Passat G60, Volkswagen Corrado G60

== See also ==
- list of Volkswagen Group petrol engines
- list of Volkswagen Group diesel engines
- list of discontinued Volkswagen Group petrol engines
- list of discontinued Volkswagen Group diesel engines
- list of North American Volkswagen engines
- Volkswagen Wasserboxer engine
- VR6 engine
- Turbocharged Direct Injection (TDI)
- Suction Diesel Injection (SDI)
- BlueMotion
- list of Volkswagen Group platforms
