= SEAT León =

Small family car range produced by Cupra and SEAT

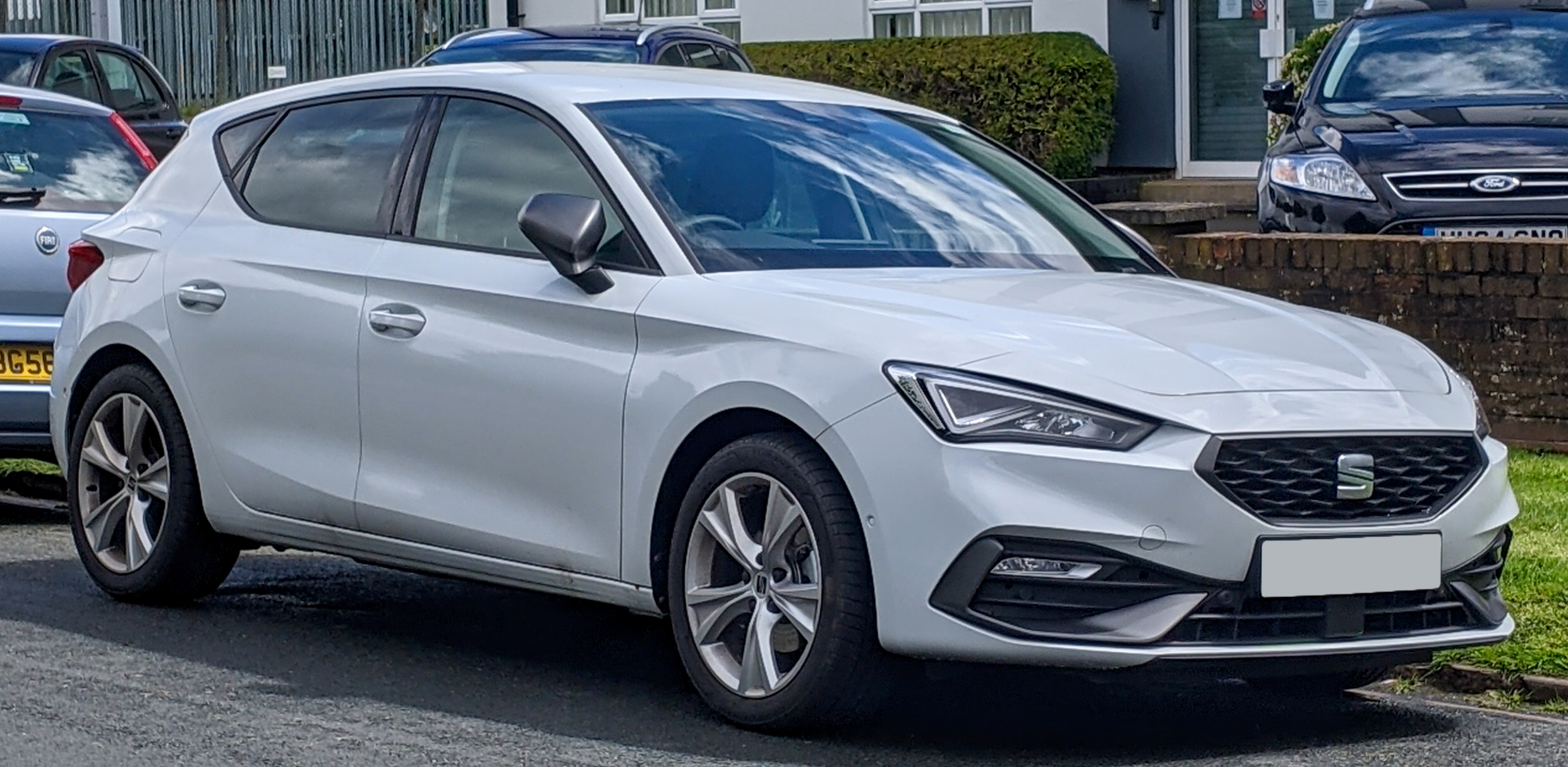
- SEAT León Mk4

Overview
- Manufacturer: SEAT
- Also called: Cupra León (2020–present)
- Production: October 1999 – present

Body and chassis
- Class: Compact car/small family car (C)
- Body style: 3-door hatchback (2013–2018); 5-door hatchback; 5-door estate (2013–present)
- Layout: Front-engine, front-wheel-drive or all-wheel-drive

Chronology
- Predecessor: SEAT Ronda

The SEAT León (Spanish pronunciation: [ˈse.at leˈon]), also spelled Leon in some markets, is a small family car built by the Spanish car manufacturer SEAT since October 1999. It is named after the city of León (which also means "Lion" in Spanish).

The first two León generations used two differing variants of the Volkswagen Group A platform, and shared many components with other Volkswagen Group cars. The third and fourth generation use the Volkswagen Group MQB platform, also used by the Audi A3 Mk3 and Mk4, Volkswagen Golf Mk7 and Mk8 and Škoda Octavia Mk3 and Mk4.

== First generation (1M; 1999) ==
SEAT León Mk1 (1M)
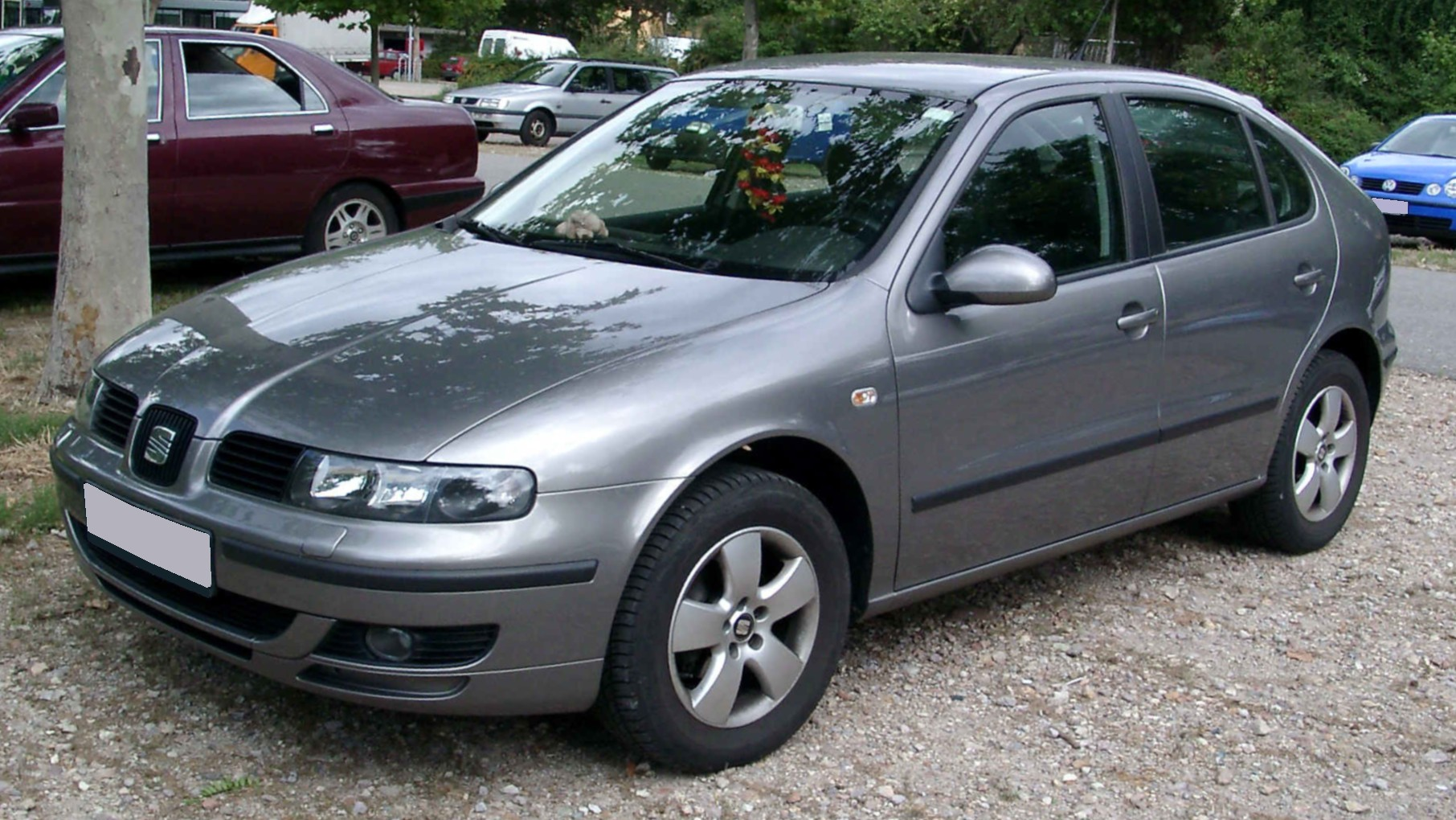

Overview
- Production: July 1999 – August 2006
- Assembly: Spain: Martorell, Catalonia; Belgium: Brussels
- Designer: Giorgetto Giugiaro at Italdesign

Body and chassis
- Platform: Volkswagen Group A4 (PQ34)
- Related: Audi A3 Mk1; Audi TT Mk1; Volkswagen Golf Mk4; Volkswagen Bora; Volkswagen New Beetle; SEAT Toledo Mk2; Škoda Octavia Mk1

Powertrain
- Engine: Petrol: 1.4 L AHW/APE/AUA/AXP/BCA I4 16V; 1.6 L AEH/AKL/BFQ I4 8v 1.6 L I4 16v 1.8 L AGN/APG I4 20v 1.8 L AJQ/APP/ARY/AUQ I4 20v turbo 2.8 L AUE/BDE VR6 24v Diesel: 1.9 L I4 SDI; 1.9 L I4 TDI; 1.9 L I4 TDI PD
- Transmission: 4-speed automatic, 5-speed manual, 6-speed manual

Dimensions
- Wheelbase: 2,513 mm (98.9 in)
- Length: 4,183 mm (164.7 in)
- Width: 1,742 mm (68.6 in)
- Height: 1,439 mm (56.7 in)
- Kerb weight: 1,210–1,628 kg (2,668–3,589 lb)

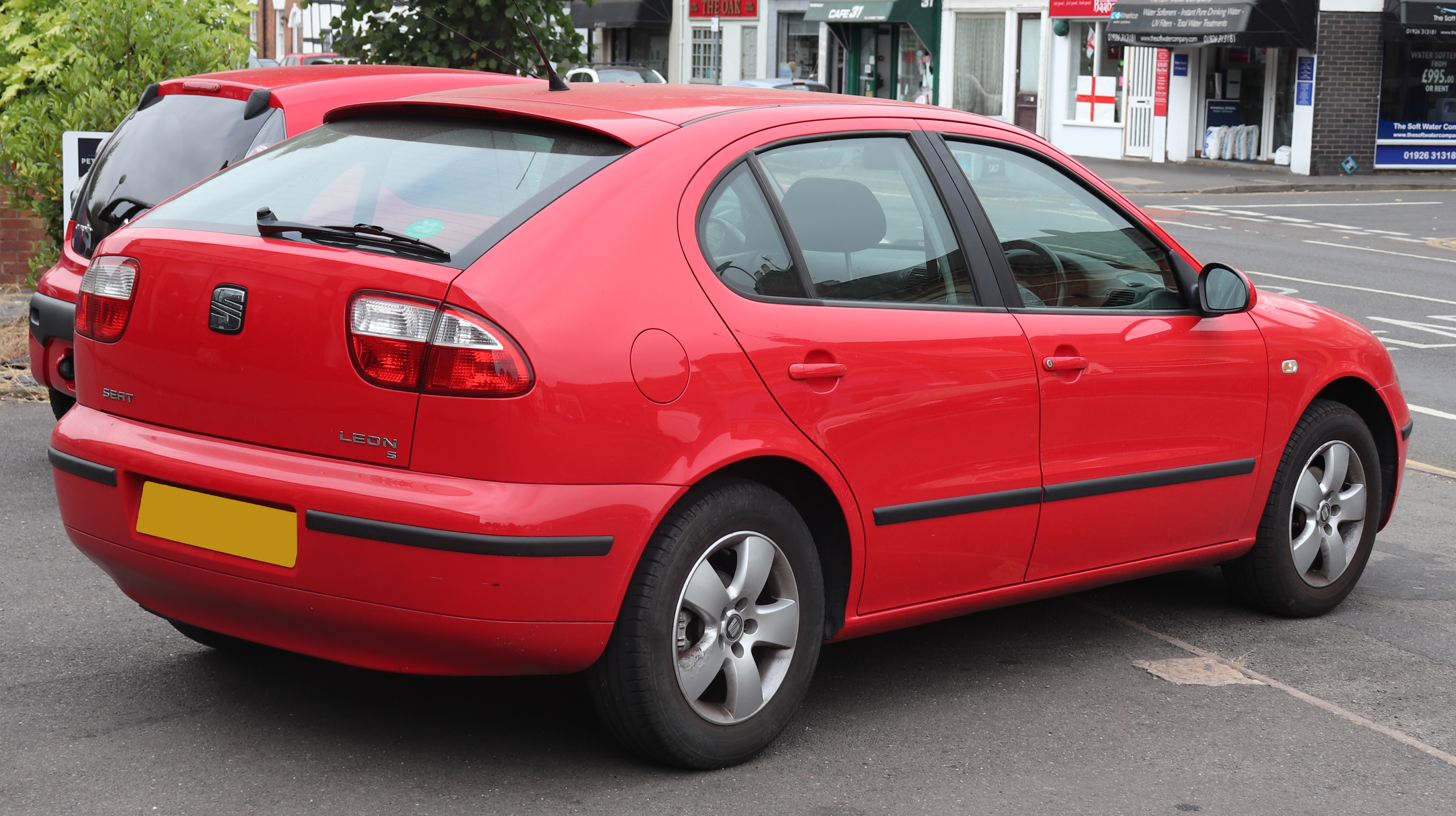
Rear view

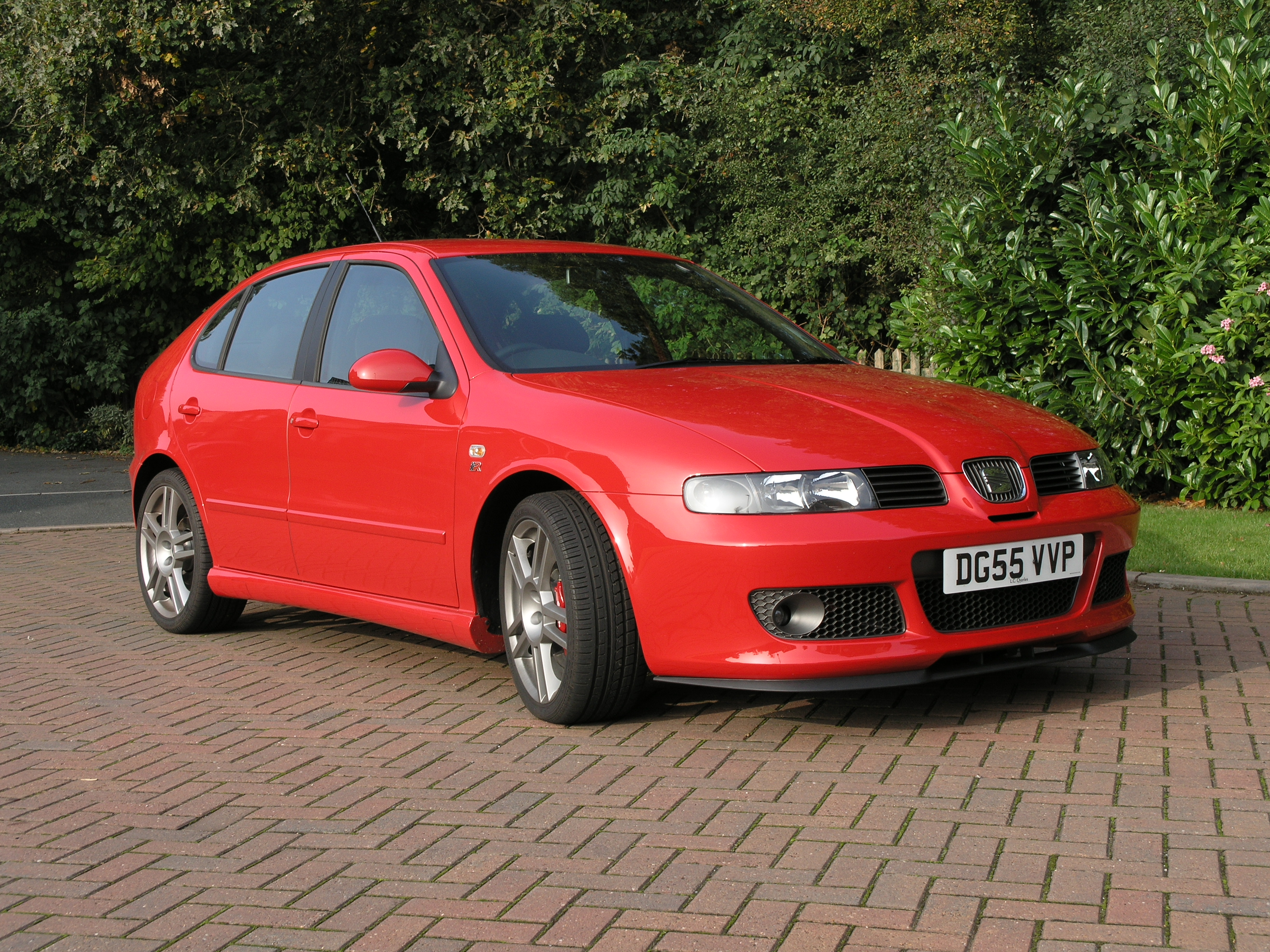
SEAT León Mk1 Cupra R

The Mk1 SEAT León hatchback (codename Typ 1M) launched in 1999, and was produced at Martorell, with a small number of 13,401 cars assembled in Belgium. Based on the Volkswagen Group A4 (PQ34) platform, it shared components with other VW Group models such as the Volkswagen Golf Mk4, but was marketed as a sportier and cheaper variant to that car. To reinforce this image it had a fastback design inspired by the Alfa Romeo Alfasud, and used firmer suspension with wider tyres to improve handling. The dashboard was derived from that of the first-generation Audi A3, with the saloon version called the SEAT Toledo.

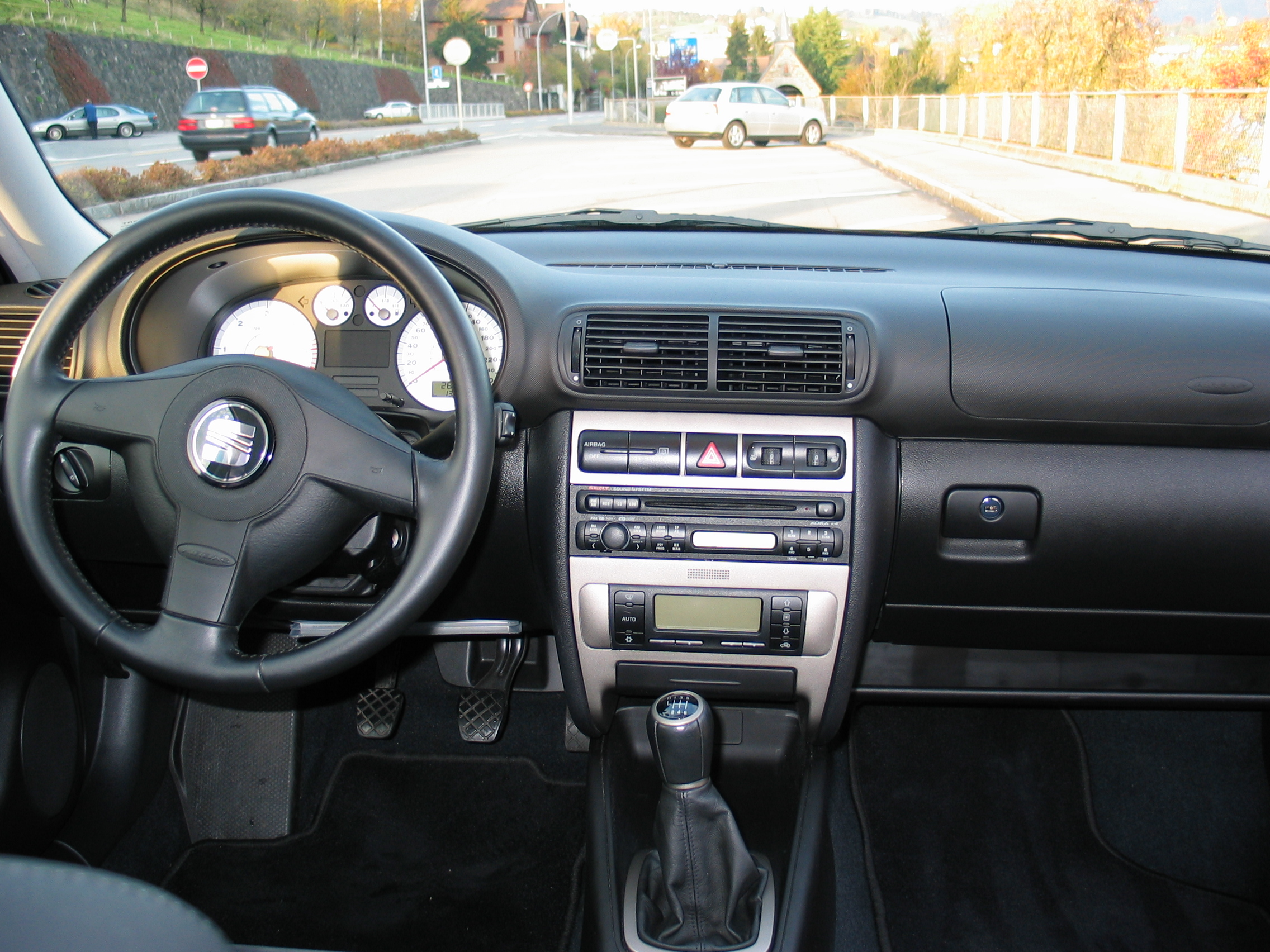
Interior

Non-turbo petrol engines were the 1.4-litre 16 valve with 55 kW (75 PS; 74 bhp) and 1.6-litre 8 valve with 74 kW (101 PS; 99 bhp). The facelift replacing the 8 valve with the 16 valve 77 kW (105 PS; 103 bhp) unit. The sportier "León 20VT" (in the UK badged as "Cupra" and then "FR"), had a 1.8-litre Turbo with 132 kW (179 PS; 177 bhp). The fastest "Cupra R" had 154 kW (209 PS; 207 bhp), and later 165 kW (224 PS; 221 bhp).

The original Cupra was only available in the red, yellow and black colours of the Spanish and German national flags, as a homage to these countries collaborating on this project.

In some countries there was a "Cupra 4" with a 2.8-litre VR6 delivering 150 kW (204 PS; 201 bhp) and four-wheel drive (4WD). This uses the same Haldex Traction system as the Volkswagen Golf 4motion.

A range of turbocharged direct injection (TDI) diesel engines were available, including a 110 kW (150 PS; 148 bhp) version. Originally sold as a "Cupra 4 TDI" 4WD, it was only sold for one year in certain countries and then became 2WD. This facelift model was first badged "Cupra" in the UK, "Top Sport" in most European countries, and then "FR" everywhere. A limited number of "FR" cars were fitted with the "Cupra R" body kit and named "FR+". Lesser diesel versions were available with 66 kW (90 PS; 89 bhp), 81 kW (110 PS; 109 bhp) and 96 kW (131 PS; 129 bhp).

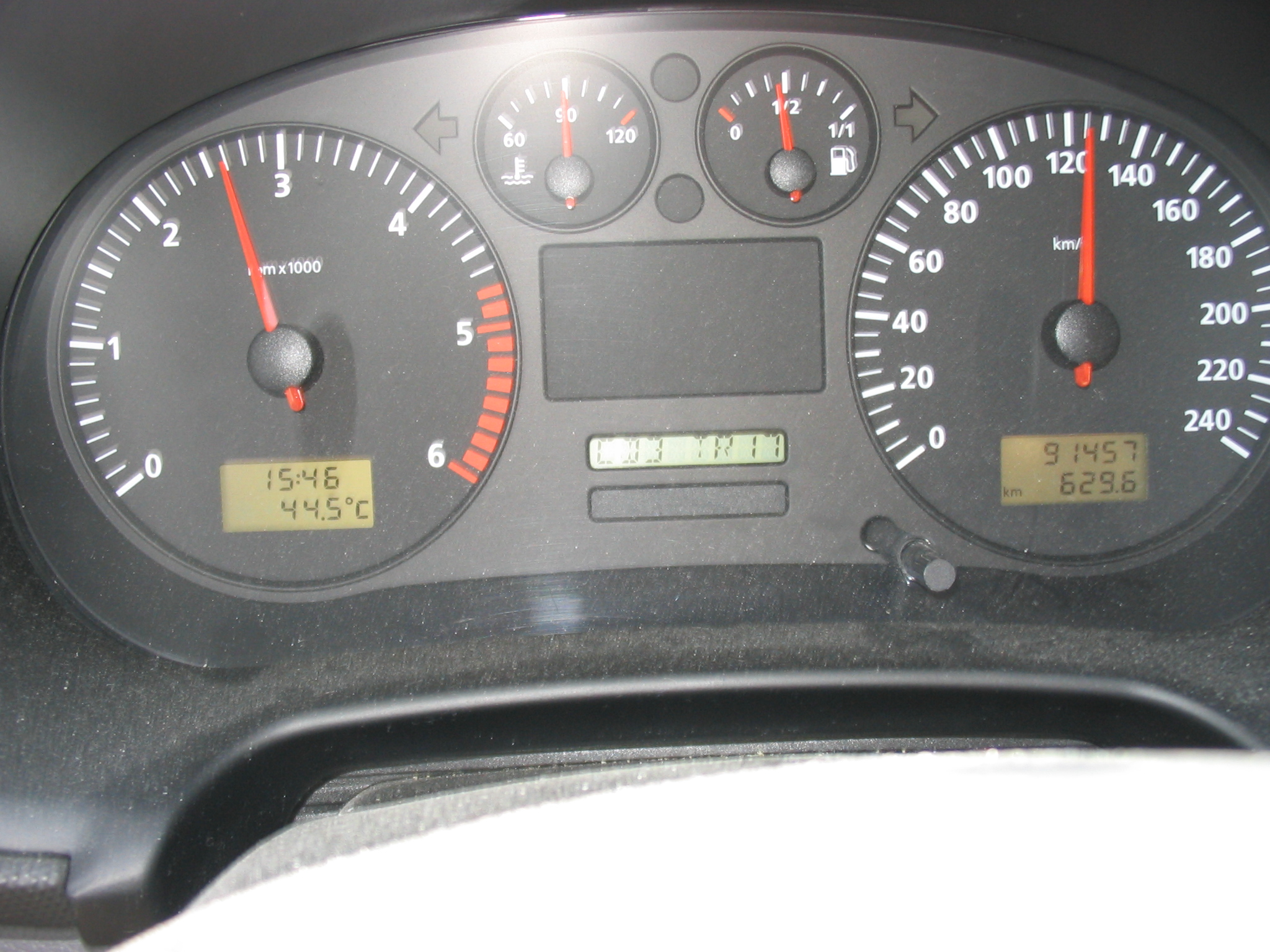
SEAT León Mk1 instrument panel

All engines over 96 kW (131 PS; 129 bhp) have a six-speed manual transmission. Rear suspension is semi-independent torsion beam, except for 4WD models fitted with multi-link independent rear suspension. All versions came with four wheel disc brakes.

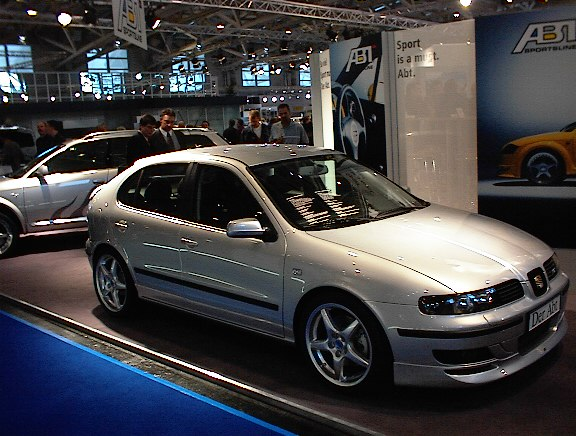
SEAT León Mk1 ABT

In Switzerland there was an official tuner model by Abt Sportsline called "SEAT León Cupra 4 Kompressor". This version added a supercharger to the 2.8-litre VR6 producing 206 kW (280 PS; 276 bhp) and 323 N⋅m (238 lbf⋅ft) of torque.

Production of the Typ 1M ended in May 2006, however the appreciation for the SEAT León Cupra R Mk1 continues. In a 2010 'best hot hatchback of all time' poll conducted by Autocar, its readers voted the Cupra R at number 7.

=== Awards ===
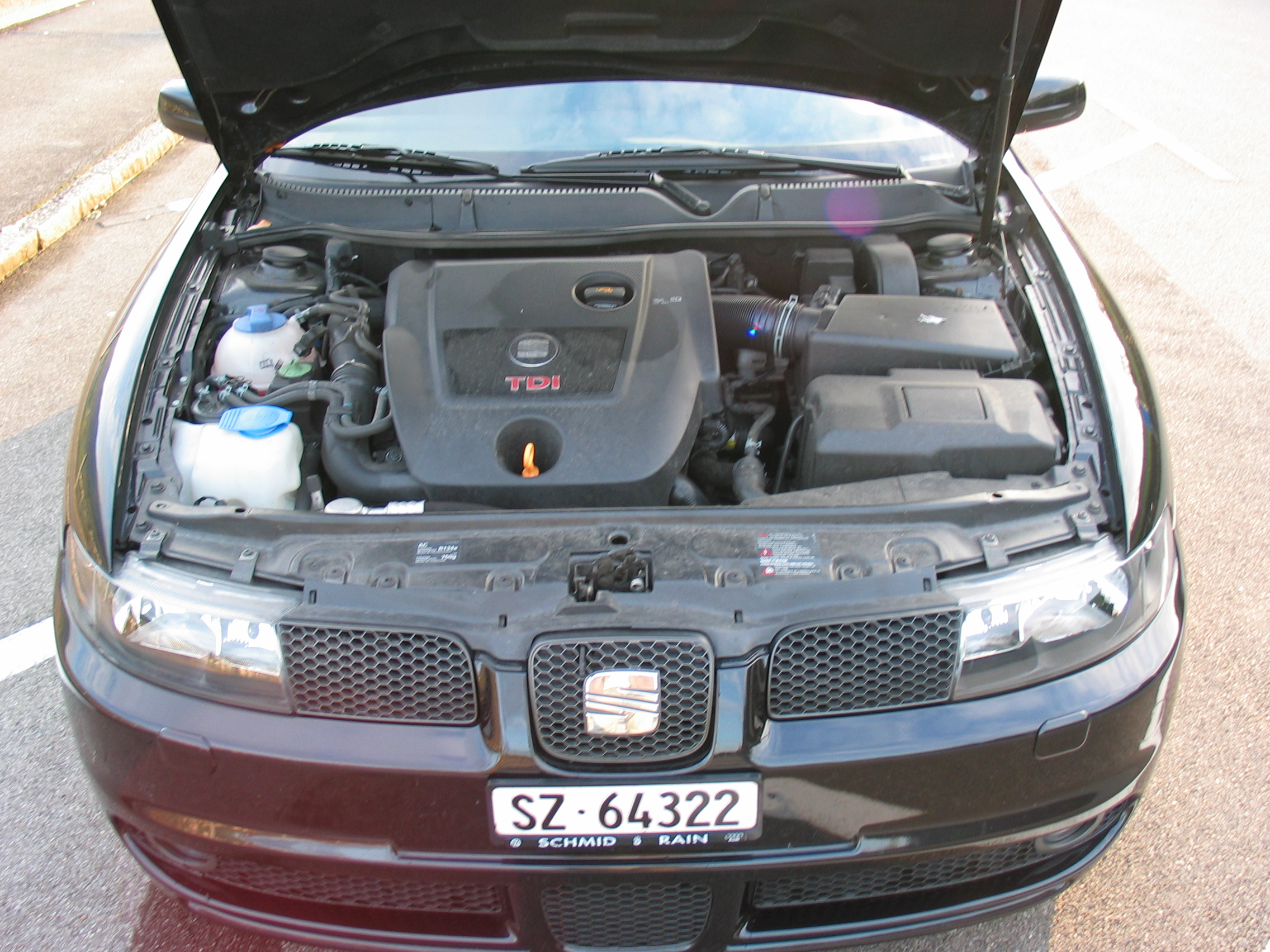
SEAT León Mk1 TDI engine compartment

- 'Carro do Ano' (Car of the Year) award in 2001, in Portugal
- 'Most Satisfactory Car of the Year 2007' in Poland, by the Polish magazine Auto Swiat

=== Engine choices ===
The Typ 1M SEAT León was available with the following internal combustion engines, with all being shared with other marques of the Volkswagen Group:

Engine designation	Displacement, configuration, valvetrain, fuel system	Max. motive power @ engine speed	Max. torque @ engine speed	Engine ID code(s)	Dates
Petrol engines, all multi-point electronic indirect fuel injection
1.4 16v	1390 cc inline-4 DOHC 16v	75 PS (55 kW; 74 bhp) at 5,000	126 N⋅m (93 lb⋅ft) at 3,800	AHW; APE; AUA; AXP; BCA	11/1999 – 10/2005
1.6	1595 cc inline-4 SOHC 8v	100 PS (74 kW; 99 bhp) at 5,600	145 N⋅m (107 lb⋅ft) at 3,800	AEH; AKL	08/1999 – 10/2005
1.6	1595 cc inline-4 SOHC 8v	102 PS (75 kW; 101 bhp) at 5,600	148 N⋅m (109 lbf⋅ft) at 3,800	BFQ	10/2005 – 06/2006
1.6 16v	1598 cc inline-4 DOHC 16v	105 PS (77 kW; 104 bhp) at 5,700	148 N⋅m (109 lbf⋅ft) at 4,500	AUS; AZD; BCB	06/2000 – 06/2006
1.8 20v	1781 cc inline-4 DOHC 20v	125 PS (92 kW; 123 bhp) at 6,000	170 N⋅m (125 lbf⋅ft) at 4,200	AGN; APG	11/1999 – 10/2005
1.8 20vT; Cupra	1781 cc inline-4 DOHC 20v Turbo	180 PS (132 kW; 178 bhp) at 5,500	235 N⋅m (173 lbf⋅ft) at 1,950–5,000	AJQ; APP; ARY; AUQ	08/1999 – 10/2005
1.8 20vT; Cupra R	1781 cc inline-4 DOHC 20v Turbo	210 PS (154 kW; 207 bhp)	270 N⋅m (199 lbf⋅ft)	AMK	05/2002 – 05/2003
1.8 20vT; Cupra R	1781 cc inline-4 DOHC 20v Turbo	225 PS (165 kW; 222 bhp) at 5,900	280 N⋅m (207 lbf⋅ft) at 2,200–5,500	BAM	05/2003 – 06/2006
2.8 VR6 24v Cupra 4	2792 cc 15° VR6; DOHC 24v	204 PS (150 kW; 201 bhp) at 6,200	265 N⋅m (195 lbf⋅ft) at 3,400	AUE; BDE	10/2000 – 04/2004
Diesel engines, all direct injected
1.9 SDI	1896 cc inline-4 SOHC 8v, VP37 distributor-type injection pump	68 PS (50 kW; 67 bhp) at 4,000	133 N⋅m (98 lbf⋅ft) at 1,800	AQM	06/2000 – 10/2003
1.9 TDI	1896 cc inline-4 SOHC 8v, VP37 distributor-type injection pump	90 PS (66 kW; 89 bhp) at 3,750	210 N⋅m (155 lbf⋅ft) at 1,900	AGR; ALH	11/1999 – 10/2005
1.9 TDI	1896 cc inline-4 SOHC 8v, Pumpe Düse Unit Injectors (PD)	100 PS (74 kW; 99 bhp) at 4,000	240 N⋅m (177 lbf⋅ft) at 1,800–2,400	AXR	10/2005 – 06/2006
1.9 TDI	1896 cc inline-4 SOHC 8v, VP37 distributor-type injection pump	110 PS (81 kW; 108 bhp) at 4,150	235 N⋅m (173 lbf⋅ft) at 1,900	AHF; ASV	10/1999 – 10/2005
1.9 TDI	1896 cc inline-4 SOHC 8v, Pumpe Düse unit injectors (PD)	130 PS (96 kW; 128 bhp) at 4,000	310 N⋅m (229 lbf⋅ft) at 1,900	ASZ	05/2003 – 06/2006
1.9 TDI	1896 cc inline-4 SOHC 8v, Pumpe Düse unit injectors (PD)	150 PS (110 kW; 148 bhp) at 4,000	320 N⋅m (236 lbf⋅ft) at 1,900	ARL	09/2000 – 12/2005

== Second generation (1P; 2005) ==
SEAT León Mk2 (1P)
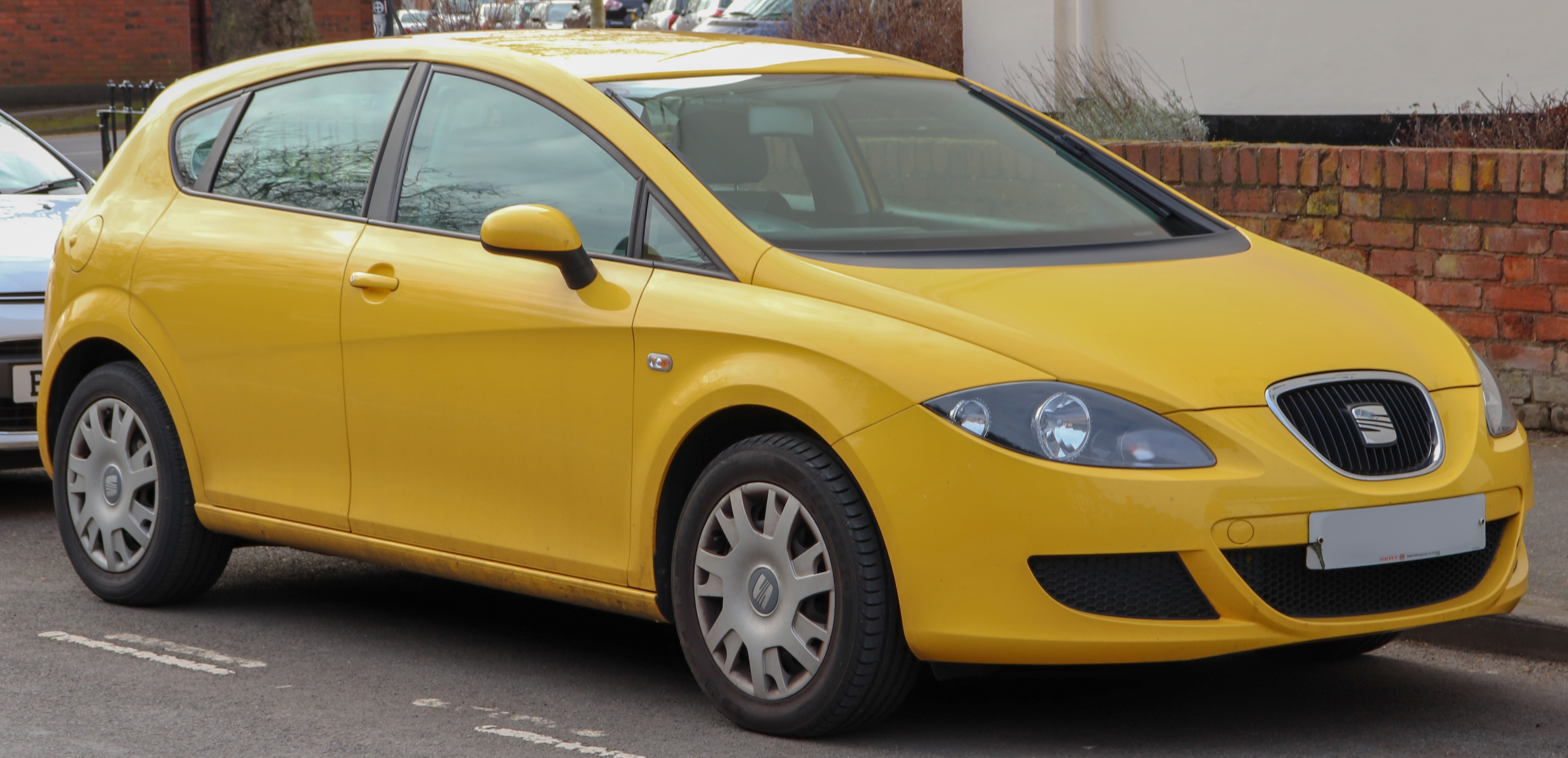

Overview
- Production: July 2005–2012
- Assembly: Spain: Martorell, Catalonia
- Designer: Walter de Silva

Body and chassis
- Platform: Volkswagen Group A5 (PQ35)
- Related: Audi A3 Mk2; Audi TT Mk2; Volkswagen Golf Mk5; Volkswagen Golf Mk6; Volkswagen Golf Plus; Volkswagen Jetta Mk5; SEAT Toledo Mk3; SEAT Altea; Škoda Octavia Mk2

Powertrain
- Engine: Petrol: 1.2 L CBZA turbo 16v I4; 1.4 L BXW/CGGB 16v I4; 1.4 L CAXC turbo 16v I4; 1.6 L BSE/BSF/CCSA 8v I4; 1.8 L BZB/CDAA TSI 16v I4; 2.0 L BLR/BLY/BVY/BVZ FSI 16v I4; 2.0 L BWA/BWJ/CDLA/CDLD FSI turbo 16v I4; 2.0 L CCZB (EA888) FSI turbo 16v I4; Petrol LPG: 1.6 L LPG I4; Diesel: 1.6 L CAYB/CAYC TDI 16v I4; 1.9 L BXF/BKC/BLS/BXE TDI 8v I4; 2.0 L BMM TDI 8v I4; 2.0 L AZV/BKD/BMN TDI PD 16v I4; 2.0 L CBDB/CEGA/CFHC/CFJA TDI CR 16v I4
- Transmission: 5-speed manual 6-speed manual 6-speed DSG; 7-speed DSG

Dimensions
- Wheelbase: 2,578 mm (101.5 in)
- Length: 4,315 mm (169.9 in)
- Width: 1,768 mm (69.6 in)
- Height: 1,459 mm (57.4 in)
- Kerb weight: 1,176–1,375 kg (2,593–3,031 lb)

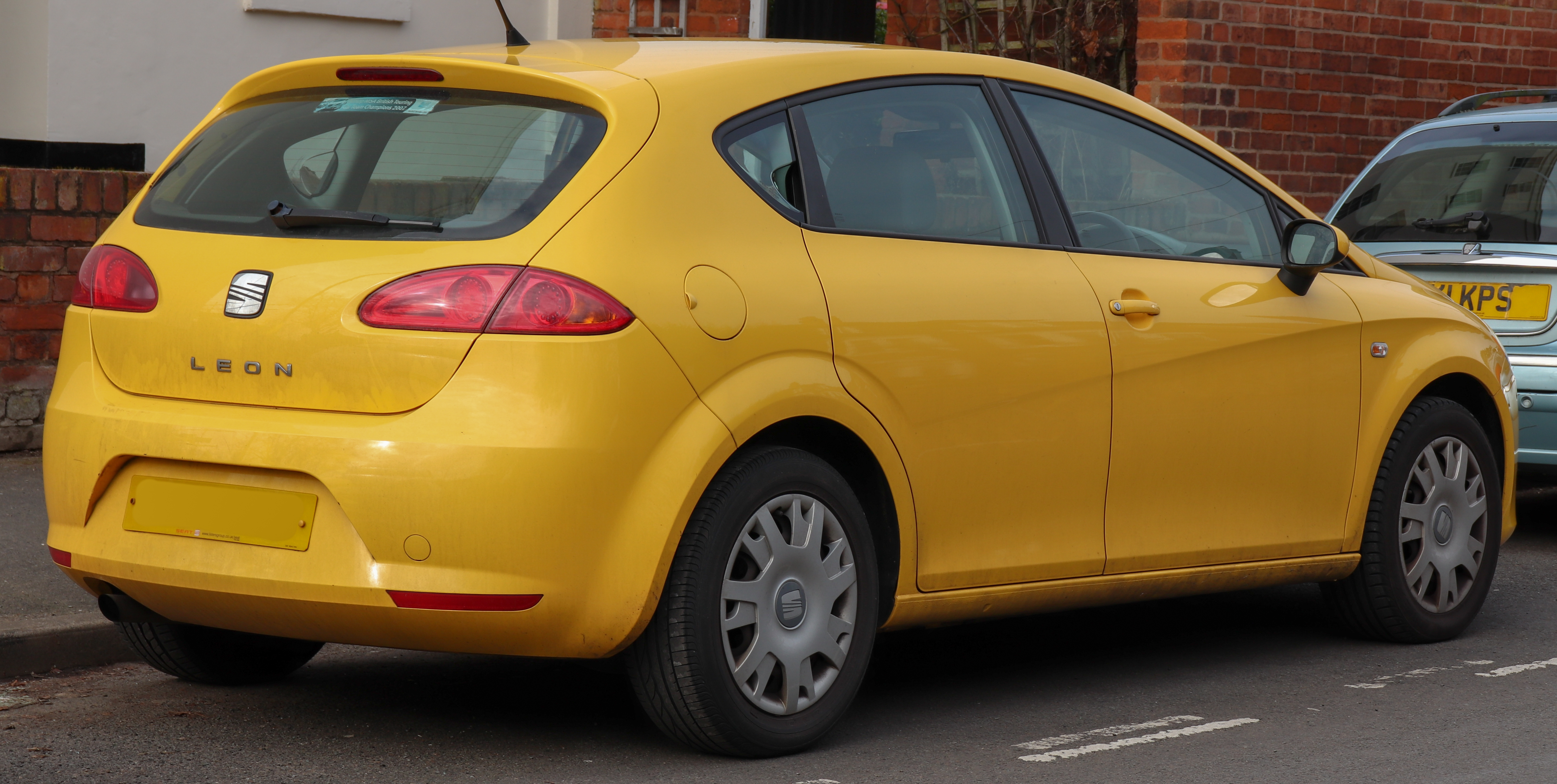
SEAT León Mk2 (pre-facelift)

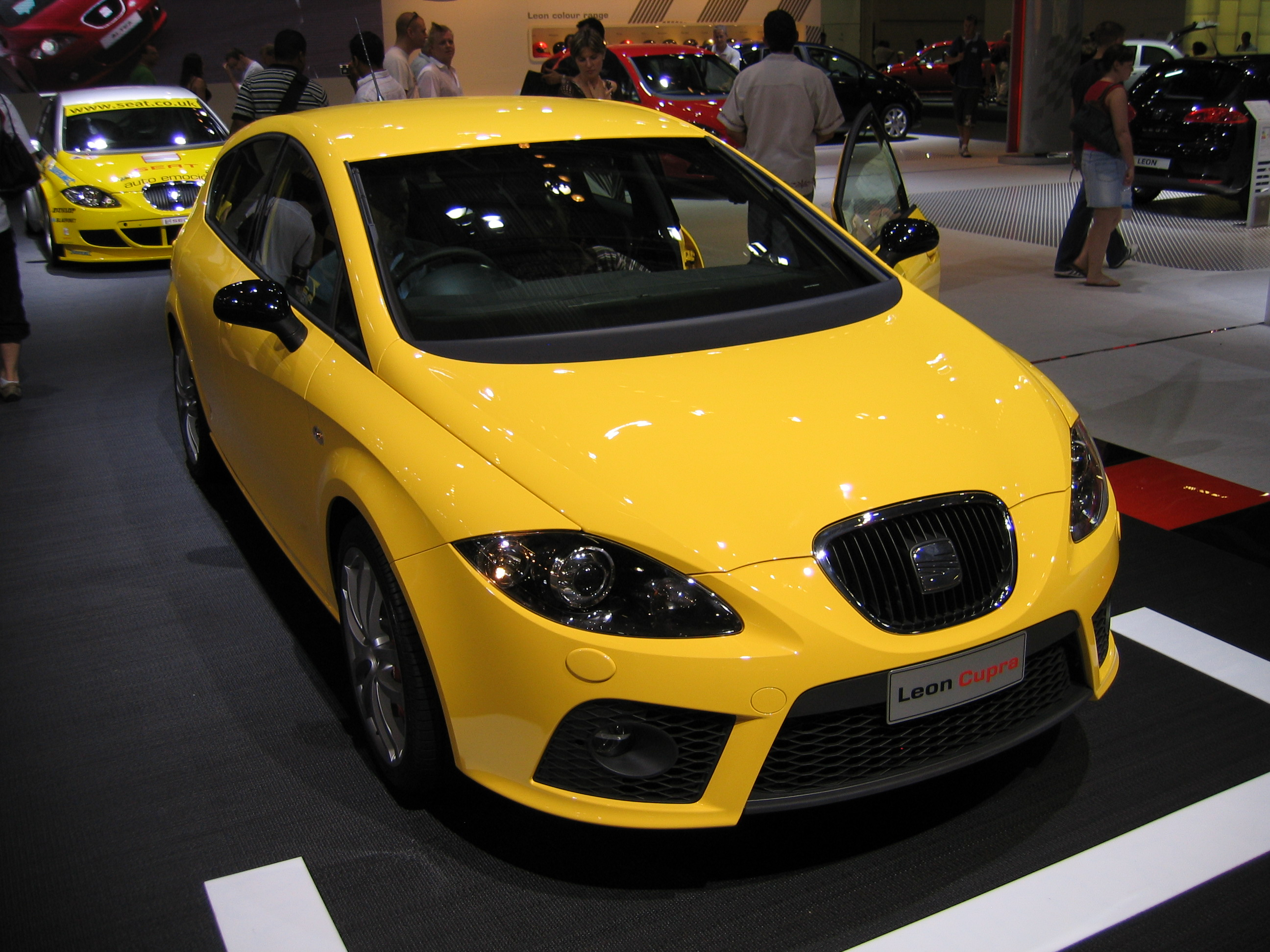
SEAT León Cupra

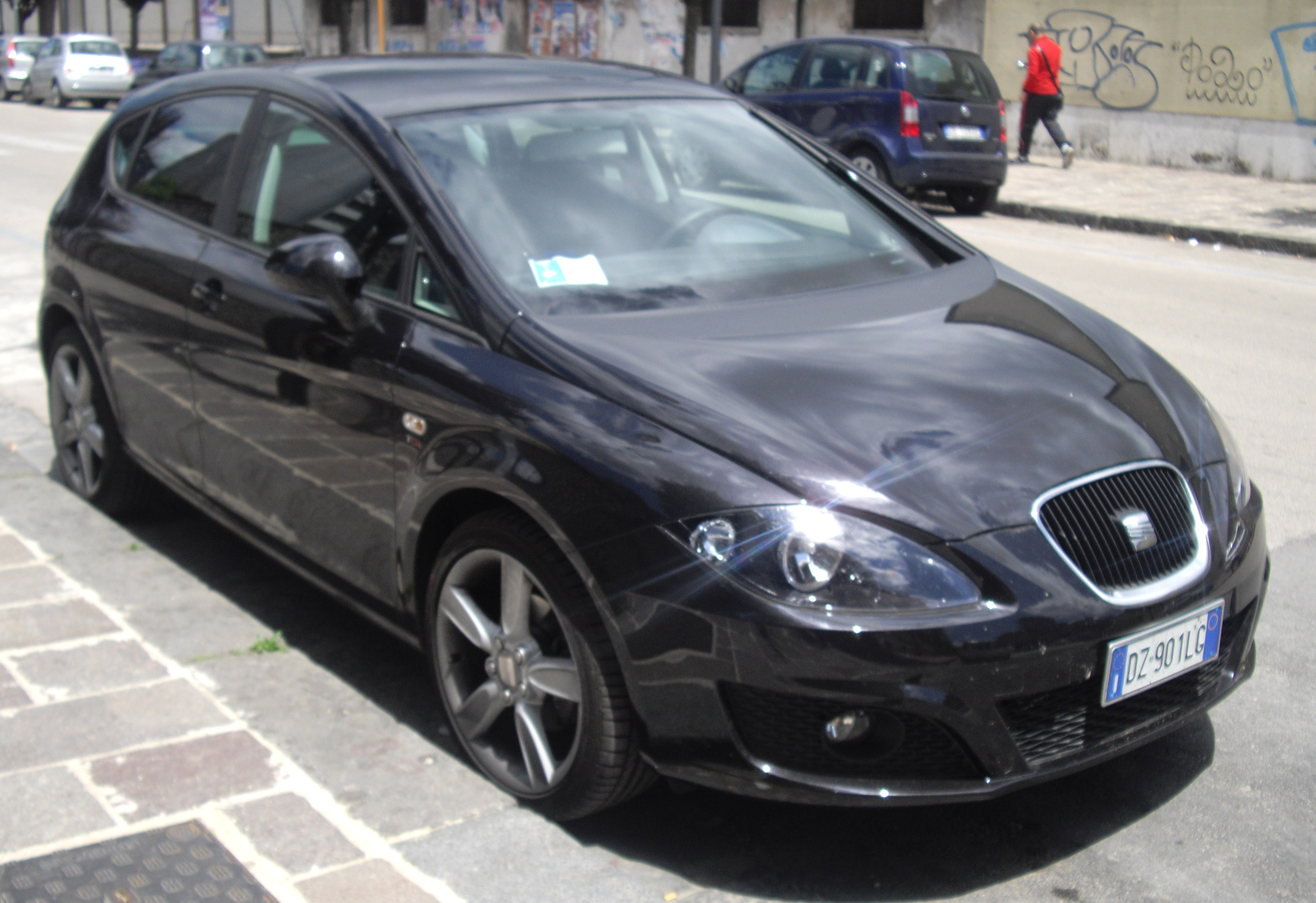
SEAT León Mk2 (facelift)

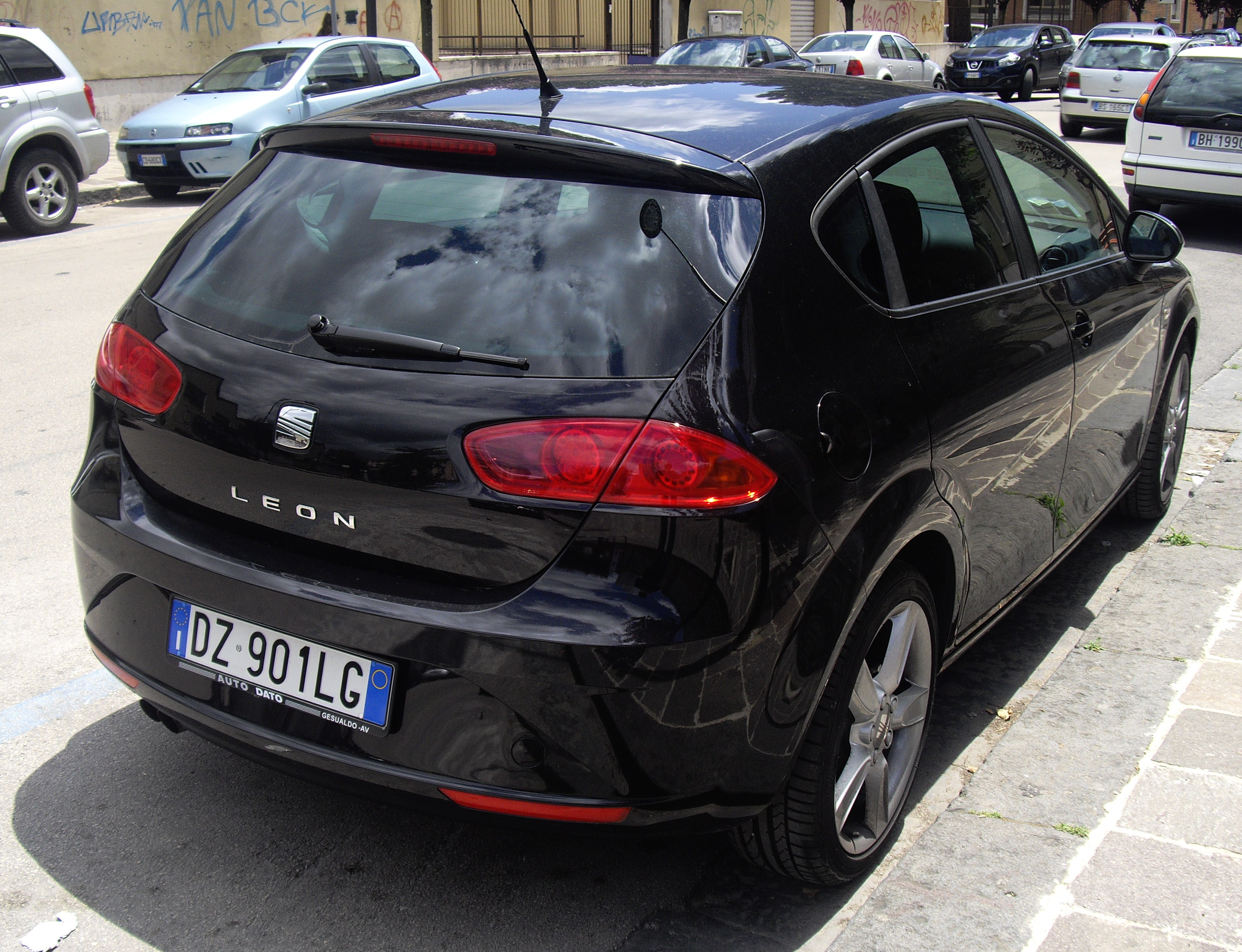
SEAT León Mk2 (facelift)

Factory production of the second generation León, internal codename Typ 1P, commenced in May 2005. Similar in design to the SEAT Altea that launched a year earlier, it debuted modern Alfa Romeo like design cues and vertically parked wipers. Volkswagen's Driver Steering Recommendation (DSR) was available as an option.

The Mk2 León used the new 16 valve 1.2-litre TSI petrol engine with 77 kW (105 PS; 103 bhp). In some markets (e.g. Greece, Romania and Italy), the base León used the older 1.4-litre MPI engine producing 63 kW (85 PS; 84 bhp). Sportier FR badged variants began with the 110 kW (150 PS; 148 bhp) 2.0-litre Fuel Stratified Injection (FSI) and the popular 103 kW (140 PS; 138 bhp) 2.0-litre Turbocharged Direct Injection (TDI) diesel engine. Both were fitted with a six-speed manual transmission, with a six-speed or seven-speed Direct-Shift Gearbox (DSG) as an option. A 136 kW (185 PS; 182 bhp) 2.0 TFSI was introduced, but due to poor sales and the launch of FR models it was discontinued.

In June 2006 the León received the 147 kW (200 PS; 197 bhp) 2.0 TFSI engine from the Volkswagen Golf Mk5 GTI, with twin chrome exhaust pipes, sport seats, stiffer suspension, climate control and FR branded parts. Also available was a 125 kW (170 PS; 168 bhp) 2.0 TDI.

The faster 2.0 TFSI Cupra model features a 177 kW (240 PS; 237 bhp) engine, with a 0-100 km/h (62.1 mph) time of 6.4 seconds. Unique Cupra parts included 18" 5 twin-spoke alloys, red brake calipers, oval exhaust, aluminium pedals, paint colours and heavily bolstered sports seats.

Launched in 2008 the K1 León Cupra was made for one year for the UK market. Inspired by the BTCC race car, it featured redesigned bumpers, side skirts, rear spoiler and oval exhaust.

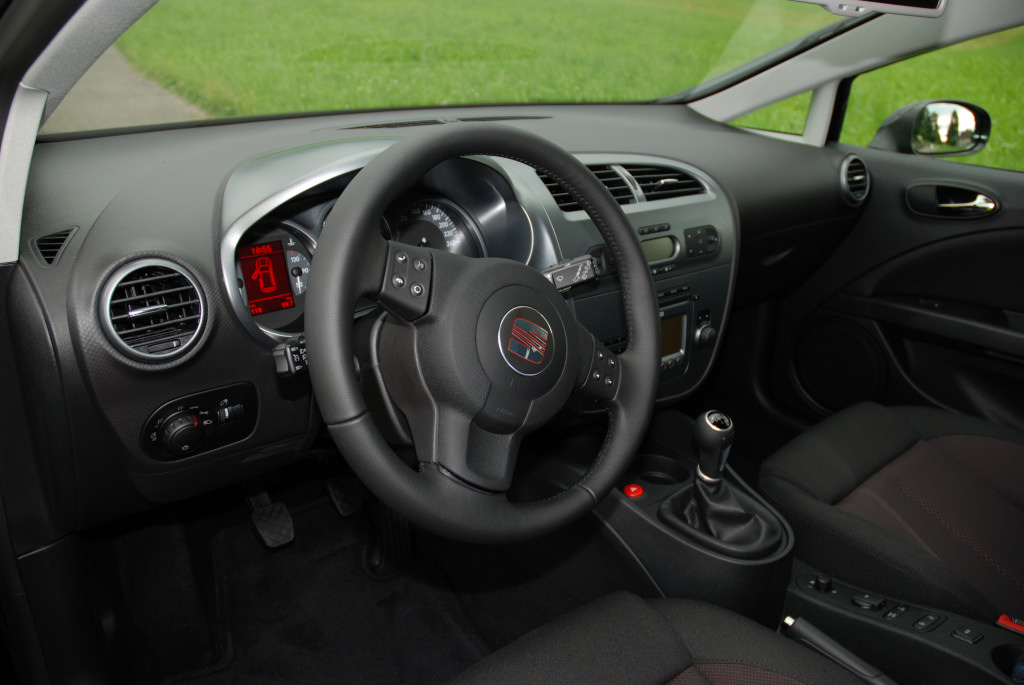
SEAT León Mk2 pre-facelift interior

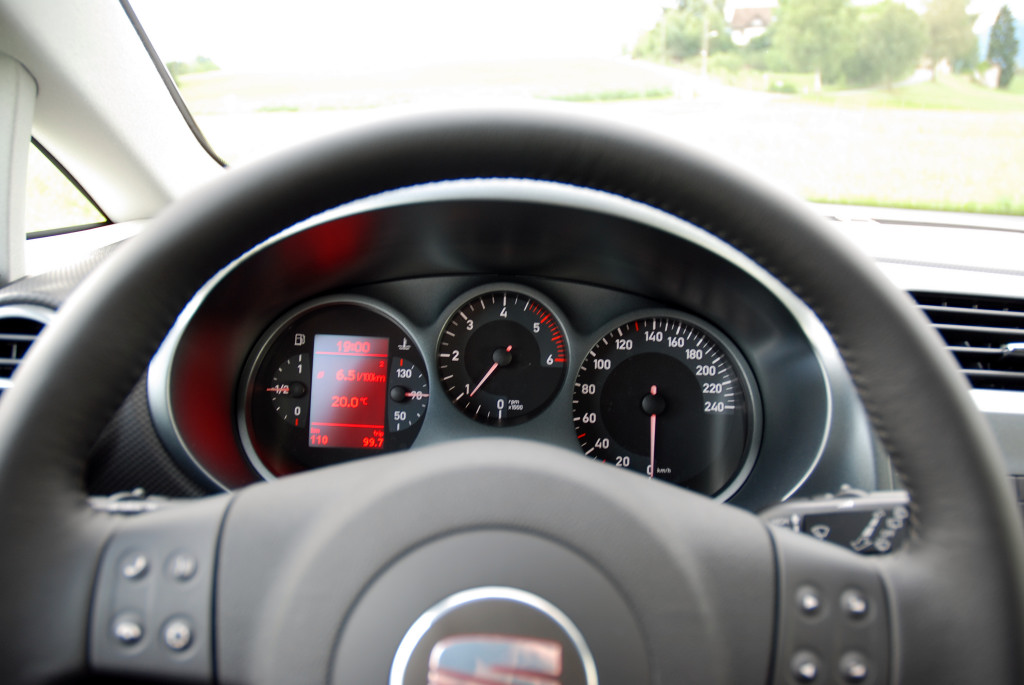
SEAT León Mk2 pre-facelift instrument panel

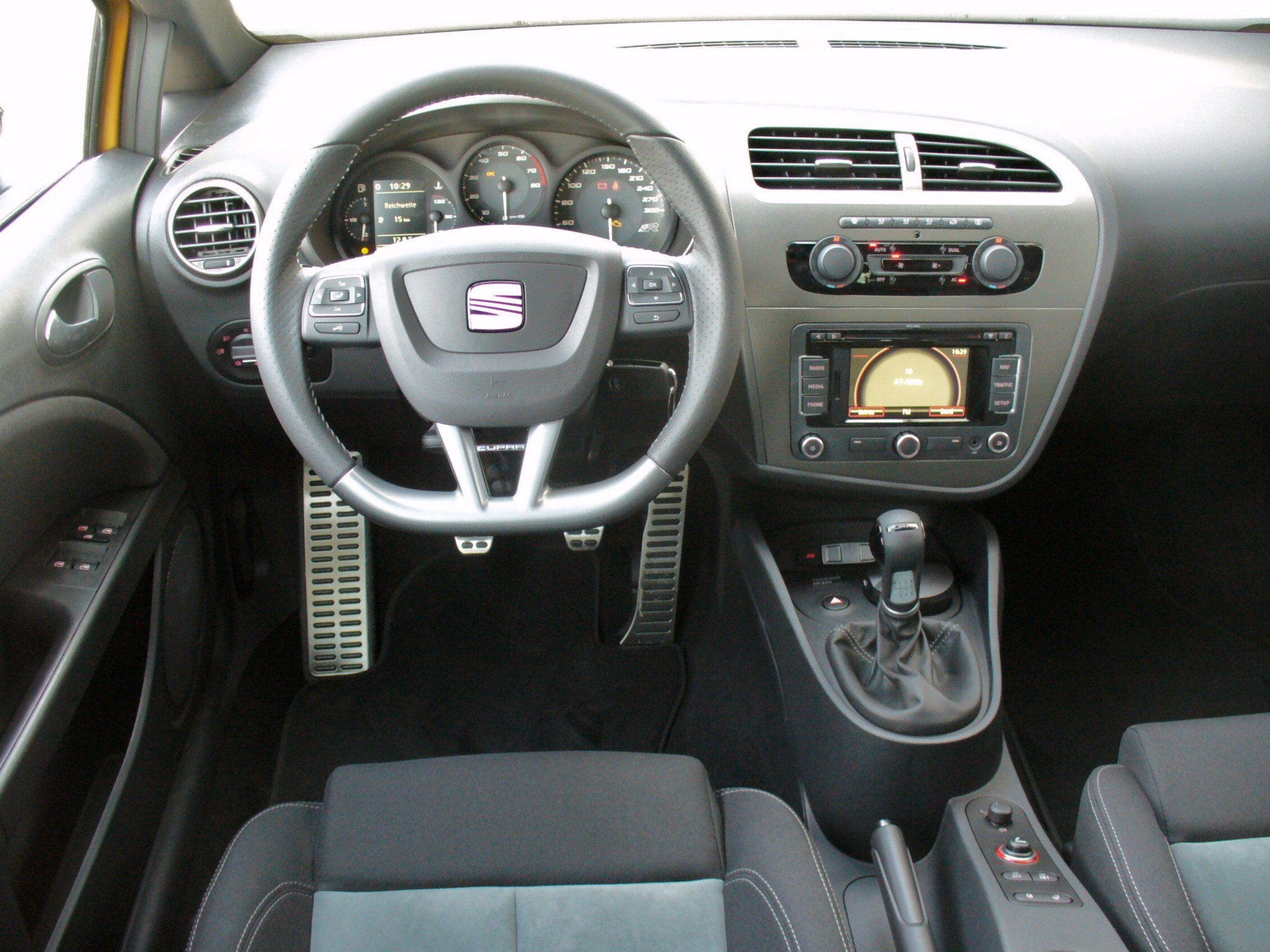
SEAT León Mk2 facelift interior (Cupra R)

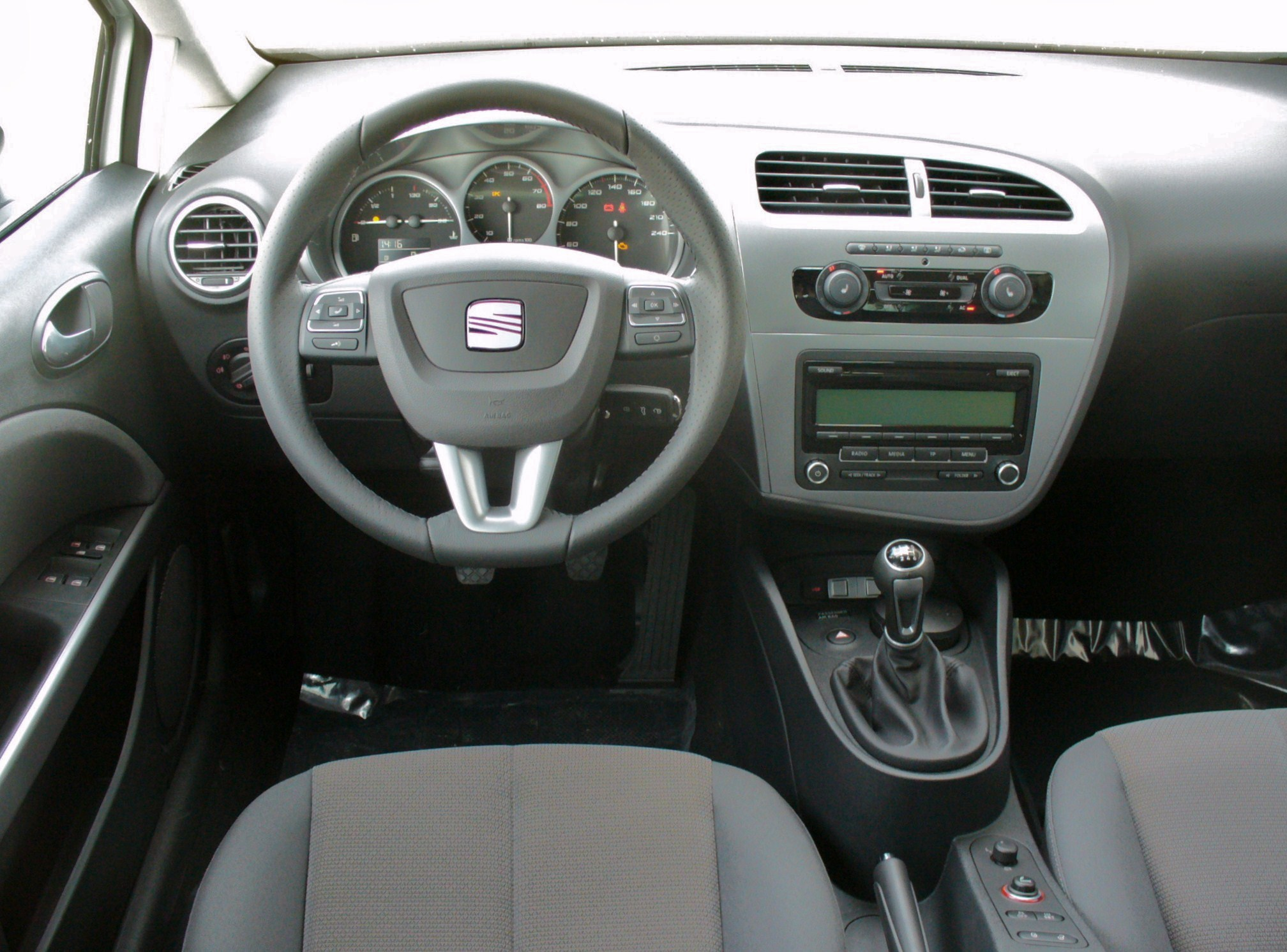
SEAT León Mk2 facelift interior (Style package)

The fastest Mk2 León is the 2.0 TFSI Cupra R, using the same 195 kW (265 PS; 261 bhp) engine found in the Audi S3 and Golf/Scirocco R. The 0–100 km/h (62.1 mph) time is 6.2 seconds with a limited top speed of 250 km/h (155 mph).

In 2009 the León range received a facelift, and the Cupra was in the SEAT Cupra race mobile game for Apple iPhone/iPod Touch available through the iTunes' App store.

=== Awards ===
- 'Red dot' award in 2006
- 'Best Car of the Year 2009' for the import compact car segment in Germany, by the German magazine Auto-motor-und-sport
- 'Firmenauto des Jahres 2006', by the German magazine Firmenauto
- 'Car of the Year 2006' in Denmark
- 'Diesel Car of the Year 2006' in Scotland (for the 170 hp 2.0 TDI León FR)
- 'Auto 1' of the Year 2006 in Spain, by the magazine Auto Bild
- 'University Car of the Year 2007' in Spain, by Spanish university students
- 'Hellenic Car of the Year 2007'
- 'GTI of the Year 2006–2007' in Greece for the SEAT León Cupra, by the Greek magazine 4-Trohoi

=== Special editions ===
==== Copa Edition ====
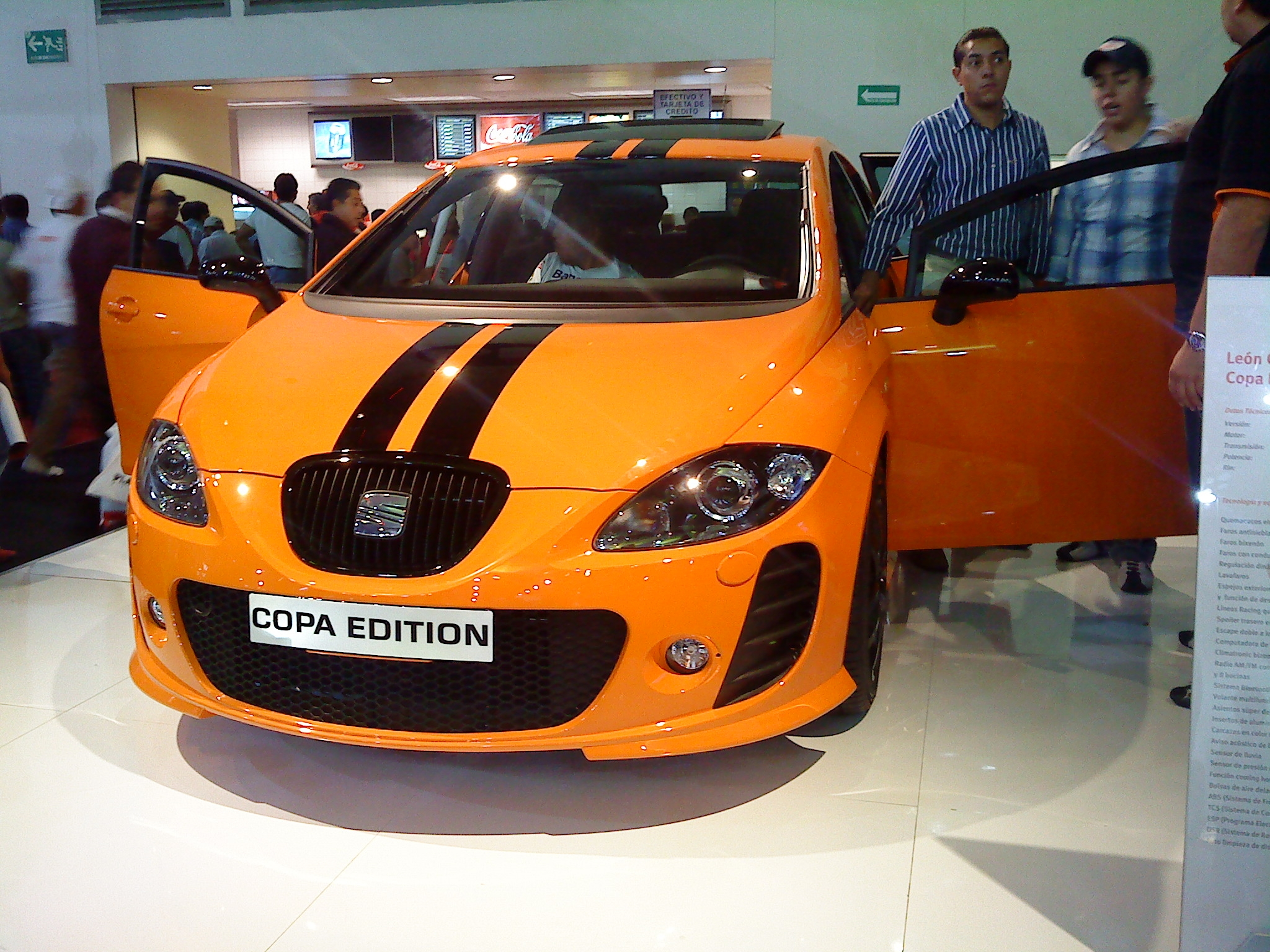
Mexican orange SEAT León Copa Edition

In 2008, SEAT Deutschland announced the production of 55 units of the SEAT León Copa Edition. This limited edition was powered with a 2.0 TFSI engine producing 210 kW (285 PS; 281 bhp), and 360 N⋅m (266 lbf⋅ft). Maximum speed is 254 km/h (158 mph) and the 0-100 km/h (62.1 mph) time is 5.9 seconds. The suspension is by Eibach, and inspired by the León Supercopa. The brakes were improved, and the car included xenon headlights, 18 inch wheels and a spoiler with larger air intakes. The only car colour available was white with black stripes.

SEAT México announced the production of 100 units of the Copa Edition in orange colour with black stripes in September 2008. The Mexican version also had a sunroof, which the European León Copa did not.

==== Streetcopa and World Champion Edition ====
At the 2008 Geneva Auto Show, the León Streetcopa limited edition was released. It was a similar edition of León Copa Edition with some changes, designed for the Swiss market and limited to 200 units. Lately, after SEAT won World Touring Car Championship, SEAT Schweiz released a facelifted version called León World Champion Edition, also limited to 200 units.

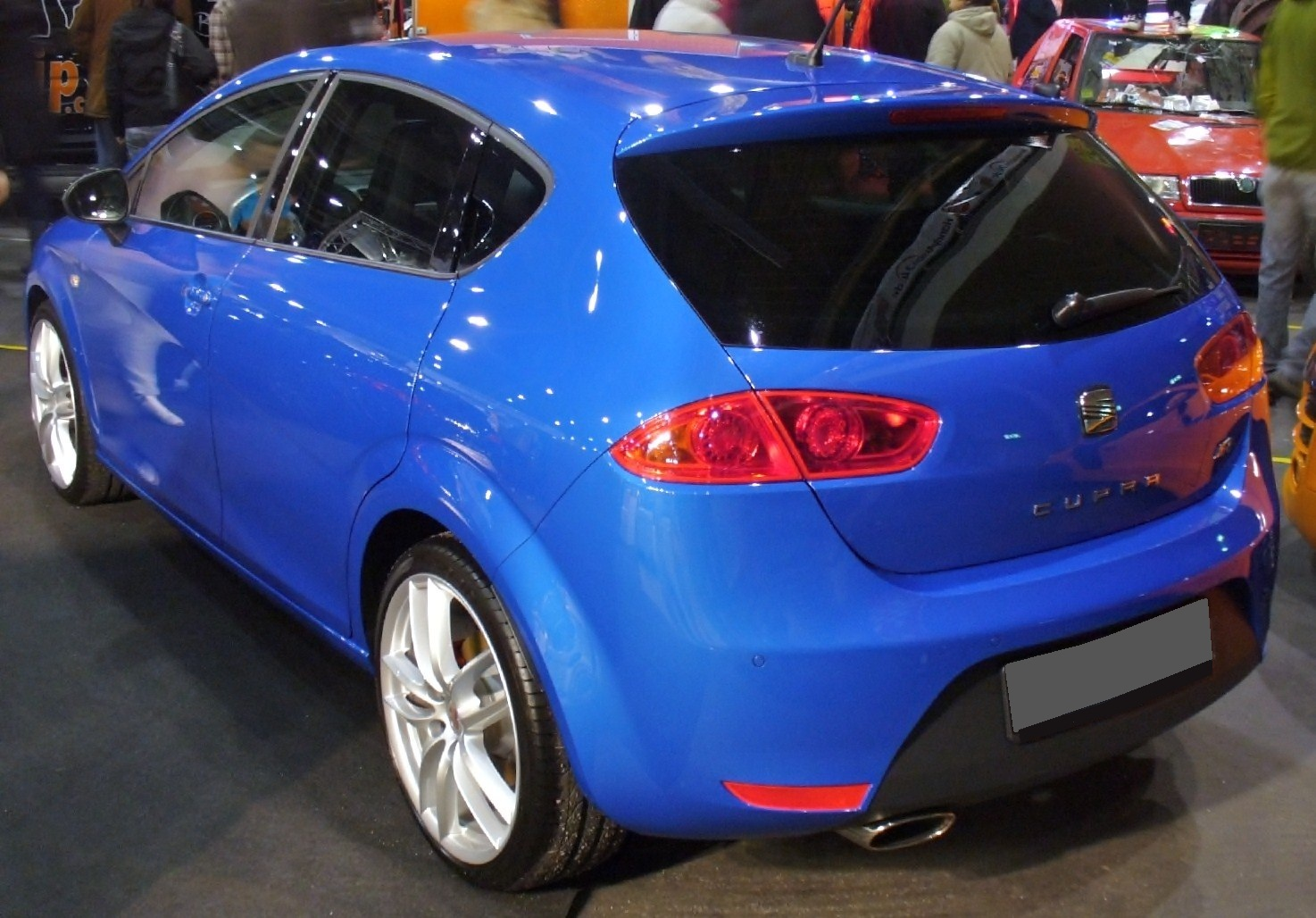
SEAT León Mk2 Cupra facelift

==== Cupra 310 Limited Edition ====
SEAT Nederland announced the production of León Cupra 310 Limited Edition, with 2.0 TFSI engine upgraded to 228 kW (310 PS; 306 bhp) of maximum power and 425 N⋅m (313 lbf⋅ft). The production was limited to 100 units.

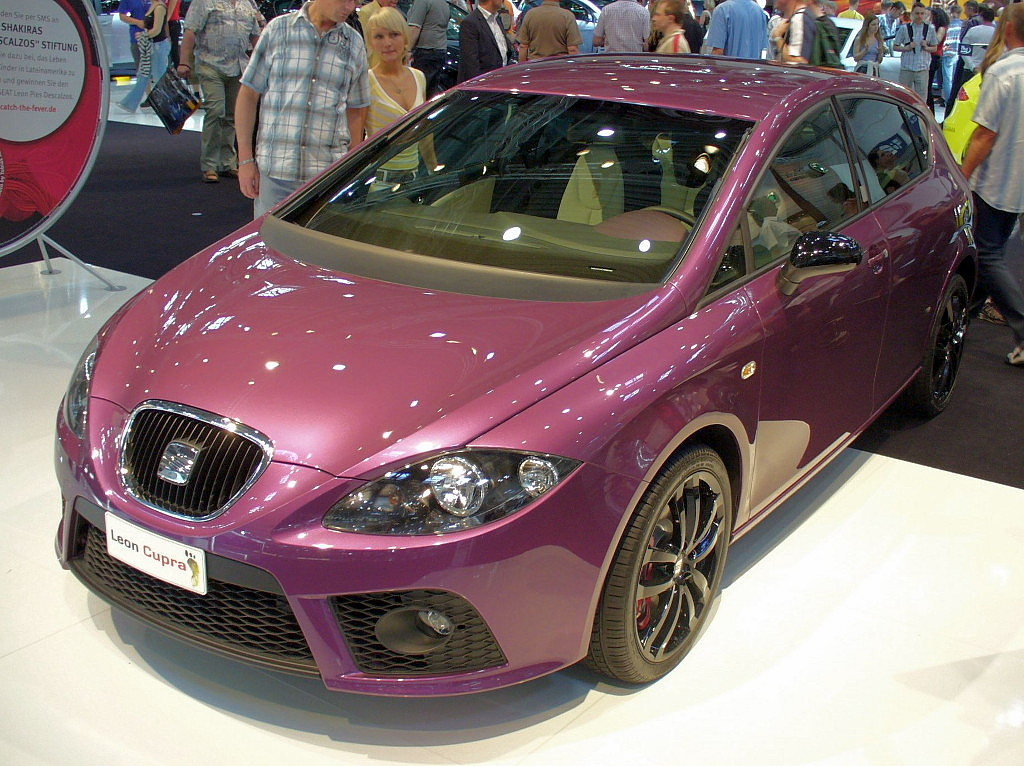
SEAT León Cupra Pies Descalzos

It came only in Candy white or Infiri black. The Cupra 310 Limited Edition featured beside the OEM Cupra equipment an engine management remapping by Abt Sportsline, black Orion-alloy wheels, an alarm system, Bluetooth connectivity and special 310 Limited Edition badges on the sides and the rear hatch. There were also stainless decals inside the front door frames displaying the 310 Ltd logo. A badge on the dashboard displayed the serial number, and the car was delivered with a key ring to match. Full factory warranty was retained with the power increase that increased the top speed to 259 km/h (160.9 mph).

==== Cupra Pies Descalzos ====
In 2007, SEAT prepared a sole car customized by Shakira. This car was auctioned, and the benefits went to the charity through Pies Descalzos Foundation. Mechanically, it is the same car as the León Cupra.

==== León Twin Drive concepts ====
SEAT produced two versions of the Twin Drive prototype. Initially announced in May 2009 as a diesel/battery hybrid, the León Twin Drive Ecomotive was a series plug-in hybrid, powered by an electric motor, through lithium-ion batteries chargeable at a regular electrical socket, in combination with a diesel-powered internal combustion engine. The Twin Drive Ecomotive project was a first step towards a 100% electric car and was planned to go into production in 2014.

The Twin Drive Ecomotive as a plug-in hybrid vehicle powered through the combination of both a diesel engine and an electric motor. The vehicle's electric motor had an output of 35 KW and a self-imposed top speed of 100 km/h (62 mph), and resumed power from Li-ion batteries placed at the rear of the vehicle, giving it a range of about 50 km (30 miles) for short urban circuits, while for longer trips the environmentally friendly tuned combustion engine was used. Quick battery recharging process from the mains through regular power sockets features.

In 2011, a revised version of the Twin Drive was shown to the press, with a 1.4TSI petrol engine producing 113 bhp (84 kW; 115 PS) in addition to a 40 bhp (30 kW; 41 PS) generator and an electric motor of 113 bhp (84 kW; 115 PS), producing a combined limited output of 161 bhp (120 kW; 163 PS) and emitting a low 39g/km of CO_{2}, with production estimated in 2015.

=== Engine specifications ===
The Typ 1P SEAT León is available with the following internal combustion engines, and like the previous generation, many are shared from other marques of the Volkswagen Group:

All engines are inline four cylinder (I4) four-stroke designs
Engine designation / model	Engine displacement	Valvetrain, fuel system	Max. motive power @ engine speed	Max. torque @ engine speed	Engine ID code(s)	Dates
Petrol engines, all fuel injected
1.2 TSI	1197 cc	16v SOHC; Fuel Stratified Injection	77 kW (105 PS; 103 bhp) at 5,000 rpm	175 N⋅m (129 lbf⋅ft) at 1,550–5100 rpm	CBZA	2010 — 2012
1.4	1390 cc	16v DOHC multi-point fuel injection	63 kW (85 PS; 84 bhp) at 5,000 rpm	130 N⋅m (96 lbf⋅ft) at 3,600 rpm	BXW/CGG	2007 — 2012
1.4 TSI	1390 cc	16v DOHC; Fuel Stratified Injection	92 kW (125 PS; 123 bhp) at 5,600 rpm	200 N⋅m (148 lbf⋅ft) at 1,500–4,000 rpm	CAXC	2007 — 2012
1.6	1595 cc	8v SOHC multi-point fuel injection	75 kW (102 PS; 101 bhp) at 5,600 rpm	148 N⋅m (109 lbf⋅ft) at 3,800 rpm	BSE/ BSF/CCSA	2005 — 2012
1.8 TSI	1798 cc	16v DOHC; Fuel Stratified Injection	118 kW (160 PS; 158 bhp) at 4,500–6,200 rpm	250 N⋅m (184 lbf⋅ft) at 1,500–4,500 rpm	BZB/ CDAA	2007 — 2012
2.0 FSI	1984 cc	16v DOHC; Fuel Stratified Injection	110 kW (150 PS; 148 bhp) at 6,000 rpm	200 N⋅m (148 lbf⋅ft) at 3,500 rpm	BLR/BLY; BVY/BVZ	2005 – 2009
2.0 TFSI	1984 cc	16v DOHC; Fuel Stratified Injection	136 kW (185 PS; 182 bhp) at 5,100–6,000 rpm	270 N⋅m (199 lbf⋅ft) at 1,800–5,000 rpm	BWA	2005 – 2006
2.0 TFSI (TSI); FR	1984 cc	16v DOHC; Fuel Stratified Injection	147 kW (200 PS; 197 bhp) at 5,100–6,000 rpm	280 N⋅m (207 lbf⋅ft) at 1,800–5,000 rpm	BWA	2006 – 2009
2.0 TSI; FR	1984 cc	16v DOHC; Fuel Stratified Injection	154 kW (210 PS; 207 bhp) at 5,300–6,200 rpm	280 N⋅m (207 lbf⋅ft) at 1,700–5,200 rpm	CCZB	2009 — 2012
2.0 TFSI; Cupra	1984 cc	16v DOHC; Fuel Stratified Injection	177 kW (240 PS; 237 bhp) at 5,700–6,300 rpm	300 N⋅m (221 lbf⋅ft) at 2,200–5,500 rpm	BWJ	2006 — 2012
2.0 TFSI; Cupra R	1984 cc	16v DOHC; Fuel Stratified Injection	195 kW (265 PS; 261 bhp) at 6,000 rpm	350 N⋅m (258 lbf⋅ft) at 2,500–5,000 rpm	CDLA	2009 — 2012
2.0 TFSI; Copa Edition	1984 cc	16v DOHC; Fuel Stratified Injection	210 kW (285 PS; 281 bhp) at 6,000 rpm	360 N⋅m (266 lbf⋅ft) at 2,500 rpm	BWJ	2008
2.0 TFSI; Cupra 310 Limited Edition; Cupra R310 WCE	1984 cc	16v DOHC; Fuel Stratified Injection	228 kW (310 PS; 306 bhp) at 6,000 rpm	425 N⋅m (313 lbf⋅ft) at 3,000–5,000 rpm	BWJ; CDLA	2008 – 2009; 2010
Liquefied petroleum gas (LPG) engines
1.6 LPG	1595 cc		75 kW (102 PS; 101 bhp) at 5,600 rpm	148 N⋅m (109 lbf⋅ft) at 3,800 rpm	CHG	2009 — 2012
Diesel engines, all turbocharged direct injection (TDI)
1.6 TDI DPF	1598 cc	16v DOHC common rail	66 kW (90 PS; 89 bhp) at 4,200 rpm	230 N⋅m (170 lbf⋅ft) at 1,500–2,500 rpm	CAYB	2010–2012
1.6 TDI DPF	1598 cc	16v DOHC common rail	77 kW (105 PS; 103 bhp) at 4,400 rpm	250 N⋅m (184 lbf⋅ft) at 1,500–2,500 rpm	CAYC	2010–2012
1.9 TDI	1896 cc	8v SOHC; Pumpe Düse Unit Injector	66 kW (90 PS; 89 bhp) at 4,000 rpm	210 N⋅m (155 lbf⋅ft) at 1,800–2,500 rpm	BXF	2007 — 2008
1.9 TDI	1896 cc	8v SOHC; Pumpe Düse Unit Injector	77 kW (105 PS; 103 bhp) at 4,000 rpm	250 N⋅m (184 lbf⋅ft) at 1,900 rpm	BKC/BLS; BXE	2005 — 2009
2.0 TDI	1968 cc	16v DOHC; Pumpe Düse Unit Injector	100 kW (136 PS; 134 bhp) at 4,000 rpm	320 N⋅m (236 lbf⋅ft) at 1,750–2,500 rpm	AZV	2005 – 2007
2.0 TDI	1968 cc	16v DOHC; Pumpe Düse Unit Injector	103 kW (140 PS; 138 bhp) at 4,000 rpm	320 N⋅m (236 lbf⋅ft) at 1,750–2,500 rpm	BKD	2005 — 2008
2.0 TDI DPF	1968 cc	8v SOHC; Pumpe Düse Unit Injector	103 kW (140 PS; 138 bhp) at 4,000 rpm	320 N⋅m (236 lbf⋅ft) at 1,750–2,500 rpm	BMM	2006 — 2008
2.0 TDI DPF (FR Technology)	1968 cc	16v DOHC common rail	103 kW (140 PS; 138 bhp) at 4,200 rpm	320 N⋅m (236 lbf⋅ft) at 1,750–2,500 rpm	CBDB	2012 — 2012
2.0 TDI DPF; FR PD170	1968 cc	16v DOHC; Pumpe Düse Unit Injector	125 kW (170 PS; 168 bhp) at 4,200 rpm	350 N⋅m (258 lbf⋅ft) at 1,750–2,500 rpm	BMN	2006 – 2009
2.0 TDI DPF; FR CR170	1968 cc	16v DOHC common rail	125 kW (170 PS; 168 bhp) at 4,200 rpm	350 N⋅m (258 lbf⋅ft) at 1,750–2,500 rpm	CEGA	2007 — 2012
2.0 TDI DPF; FR+	1968 cc	16v DOHC common rail	125 kW (170 PS; 168 bhp) at 4,200 rpm	350 N⋅m (258 lbf⋅ft) at 1,750–2,500 rpm	CFJA	2012 — 2012

A flexible-fuel vehicle model is also on offer under the label "MultiFuel", featuring the 1.6 MPI E85 102 bhp engine.

=== Safety ===
Euro NCAP test results* SEAT Léon (2005)
Test	Score	Rating
Adult occupant:	32	4 /5 stars
Child occupant:	42	4 /5 stars
Pedestrian:	24	3 /4 stars

== Third generation (5F; 2012) ==
SEAT León Mk3
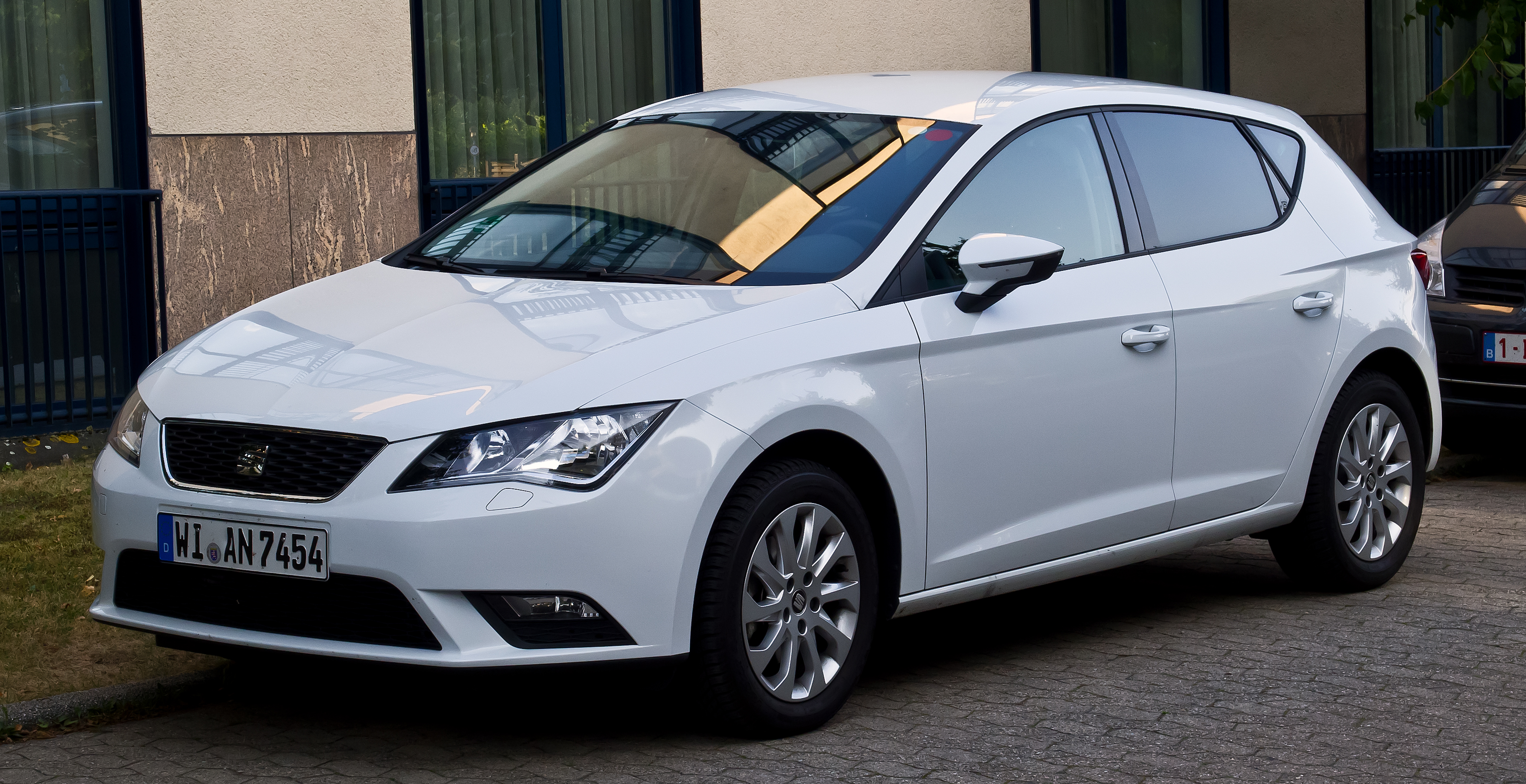
- SEAT León Mk3 pre-facelift

Overview
- Production: October 2012–2020
- Assembly: Spain: Martorell, Catalonia; Algeria: Relizane (SOVAC-VW: 2018–2019)
- Designer: Julio Lozano under Alejandro Mesonero-Romanos

Body and chassis
- Platform: Volkswagen Group MQB platform
- Related: Audi A3 Mk3; Volkswagen Golf Mk7; Škoda Octavia Mk3

Powertrain
- Engine: Petrol: 1.0 L I3 T SI; 1.2 L I4 TSI; 1.4 L I4 TSI; 1.5 L I4 TSI; 1.8 L I4 TSI; 2.0 L I4 TSI; Diesel: 1.6 L I4 TDI; 2.0 L I4 TDI
- Transmission: 5-speed manual 6-speed manual 6-speed DSG; 7-speed DSG

Dimensions
- Wheelbase: 2,636 mm (103.8 in)
- Length: 3-door: 4,228 mm (166.5 in); 5-door: 4,263 mm (167.8 in); 5-door estate crossover (ST X-perience): 4,551 mm (179.2 in)
- Width: 1,810 mm (71.3 in)
- Height: 1,446 mm (56.9 in); 5-door estate crossover (ST X-perience): 1,816 mm (71.5 in)
- Kerb weight: 1,193–1,261 kg (2,630–2,780 lb)

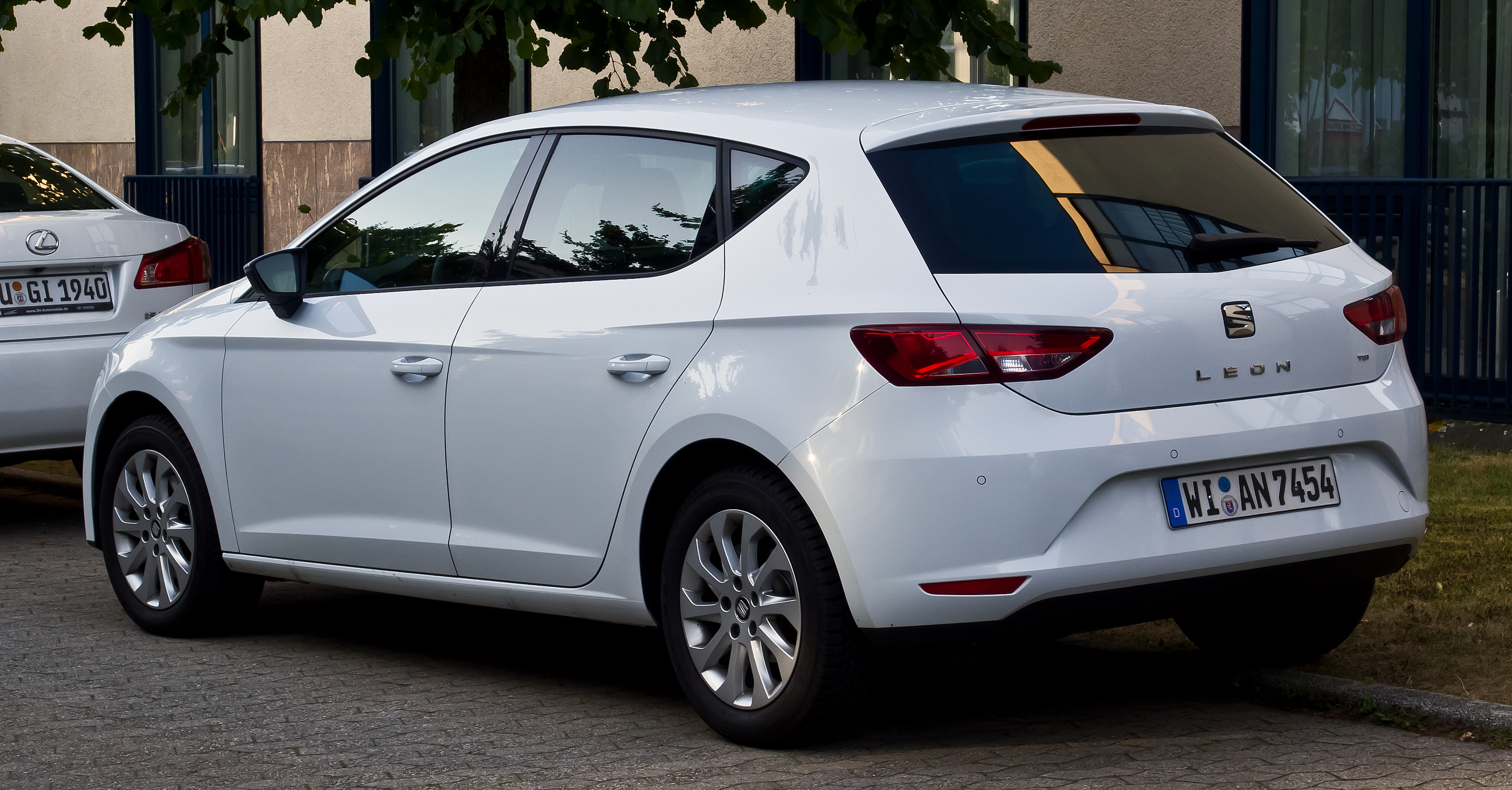

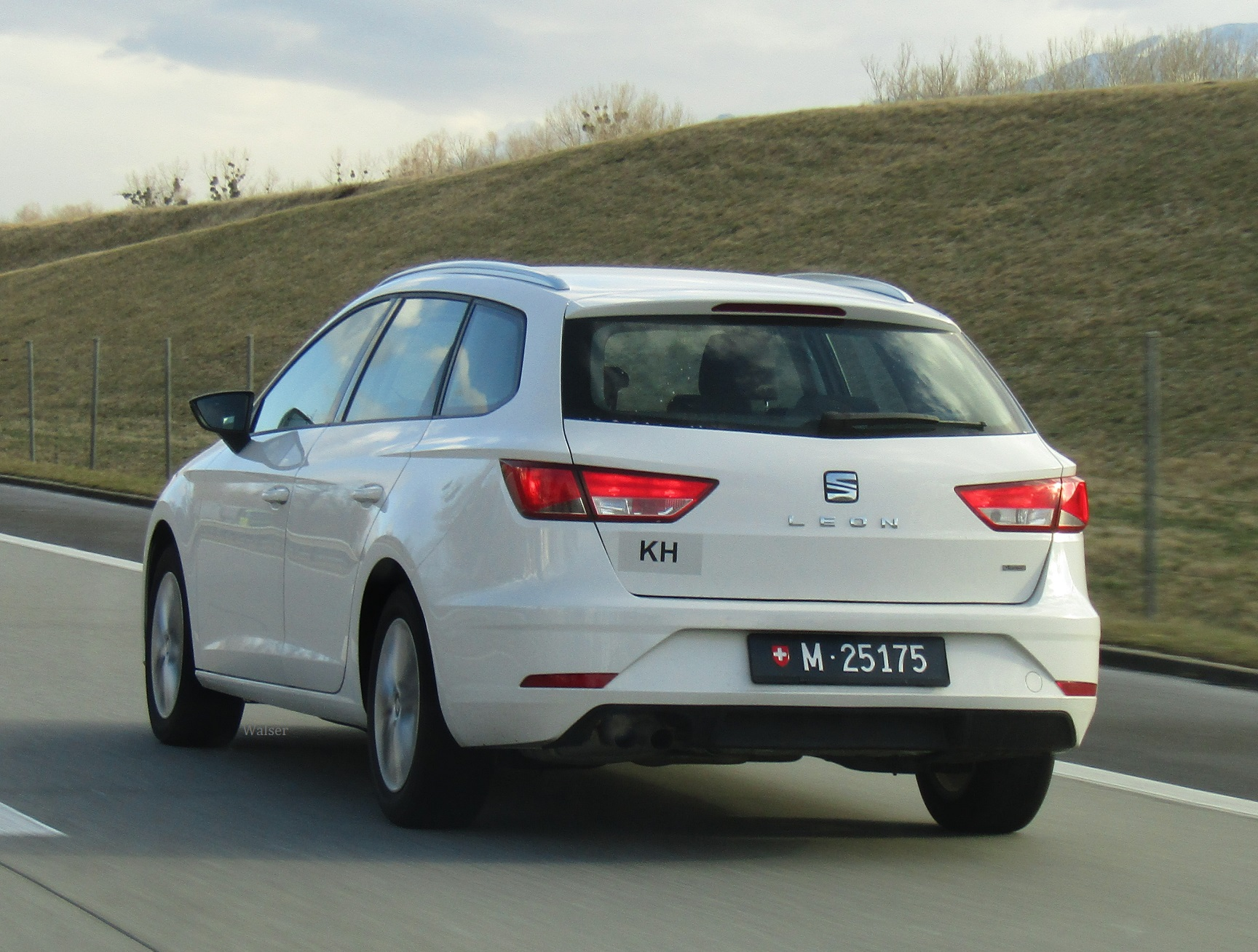
Pre-facelift Seat León

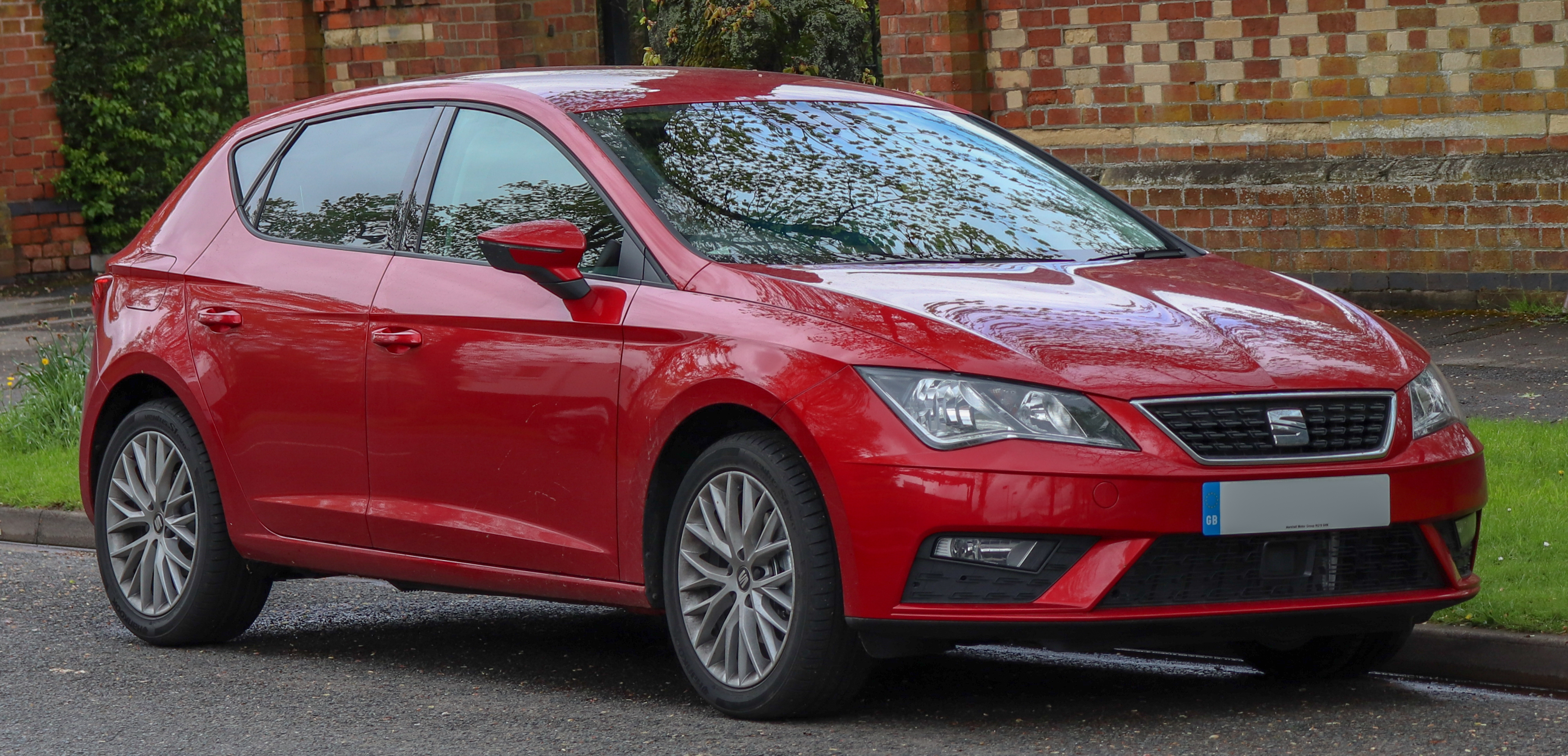
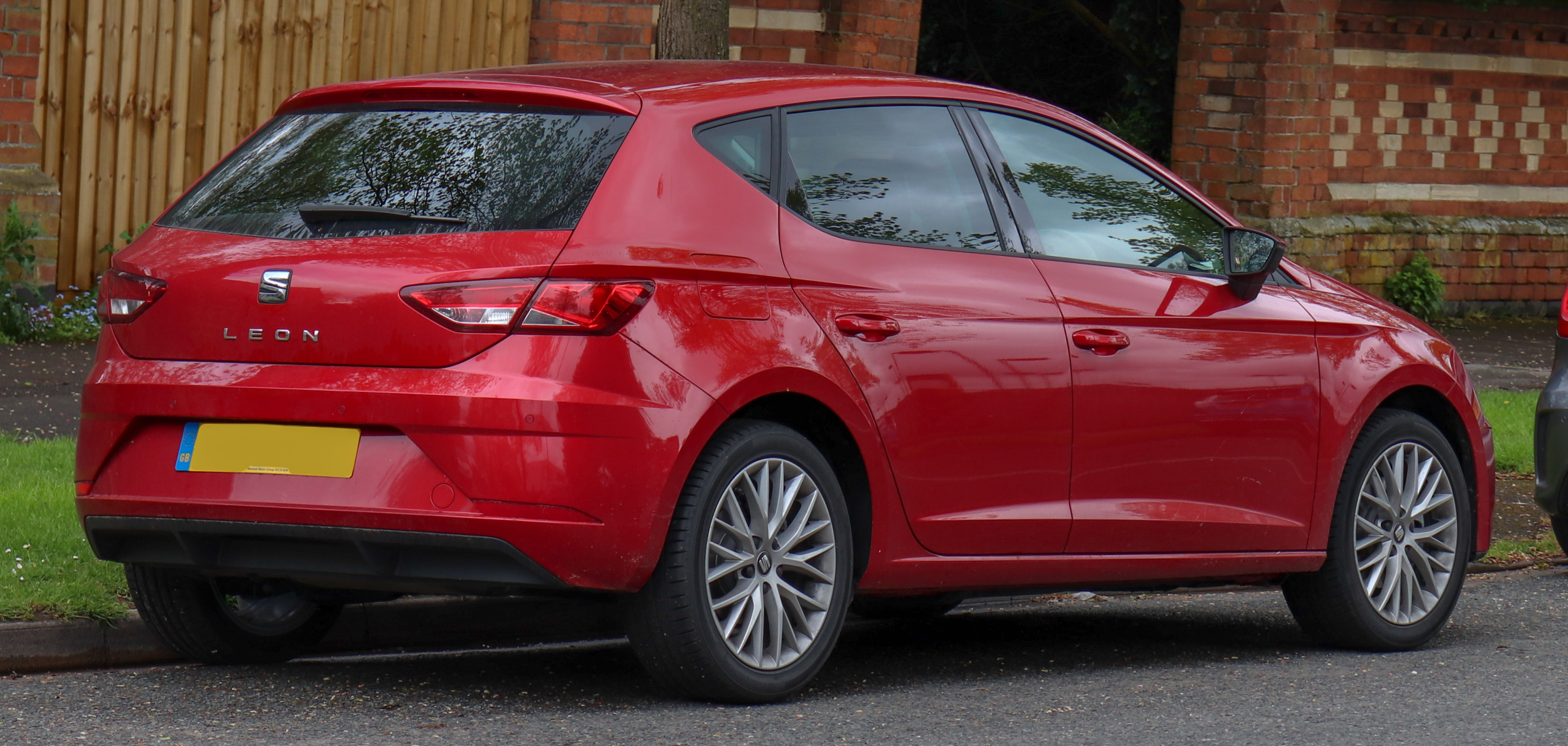

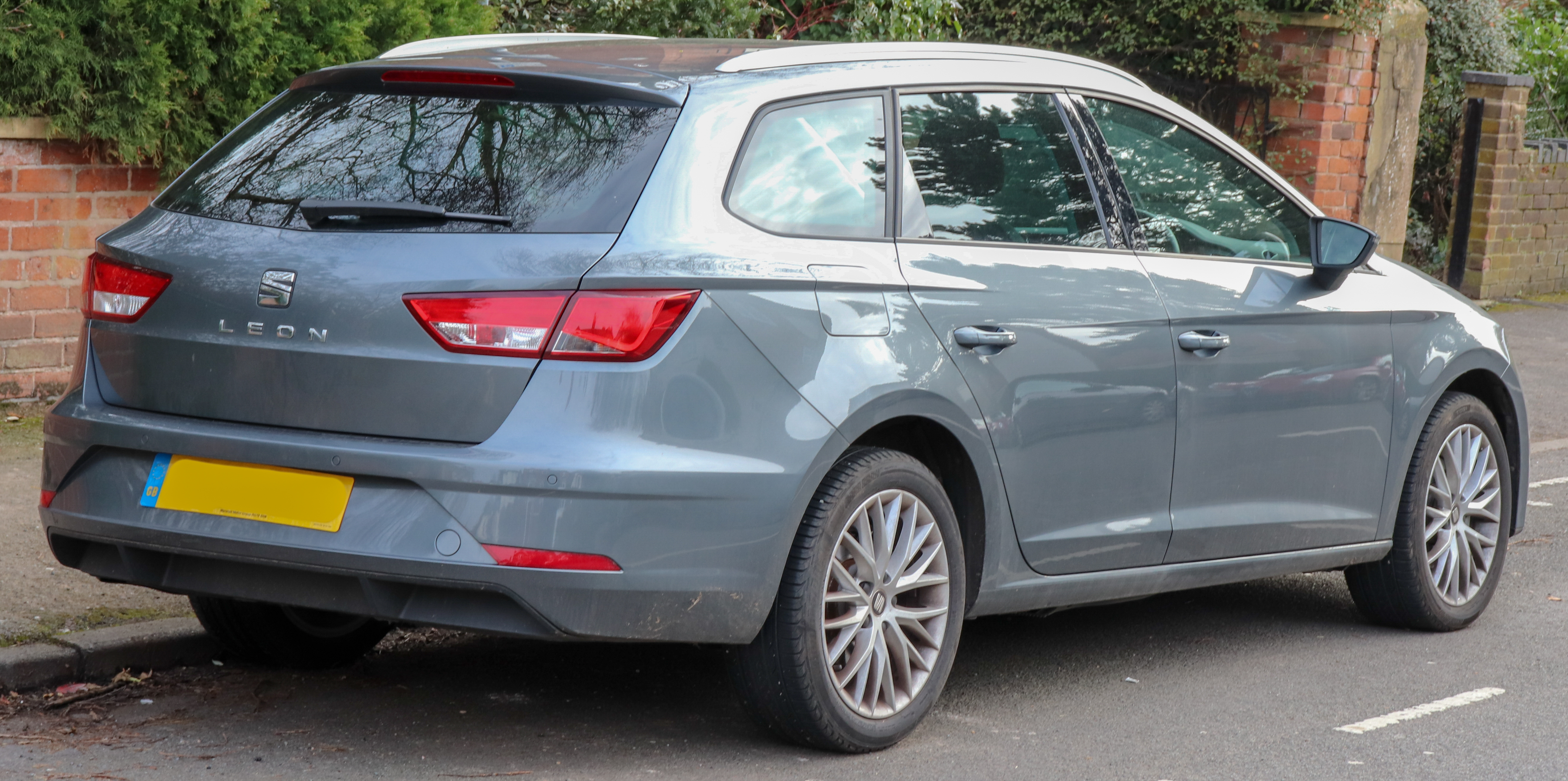
Facelift SEAT León

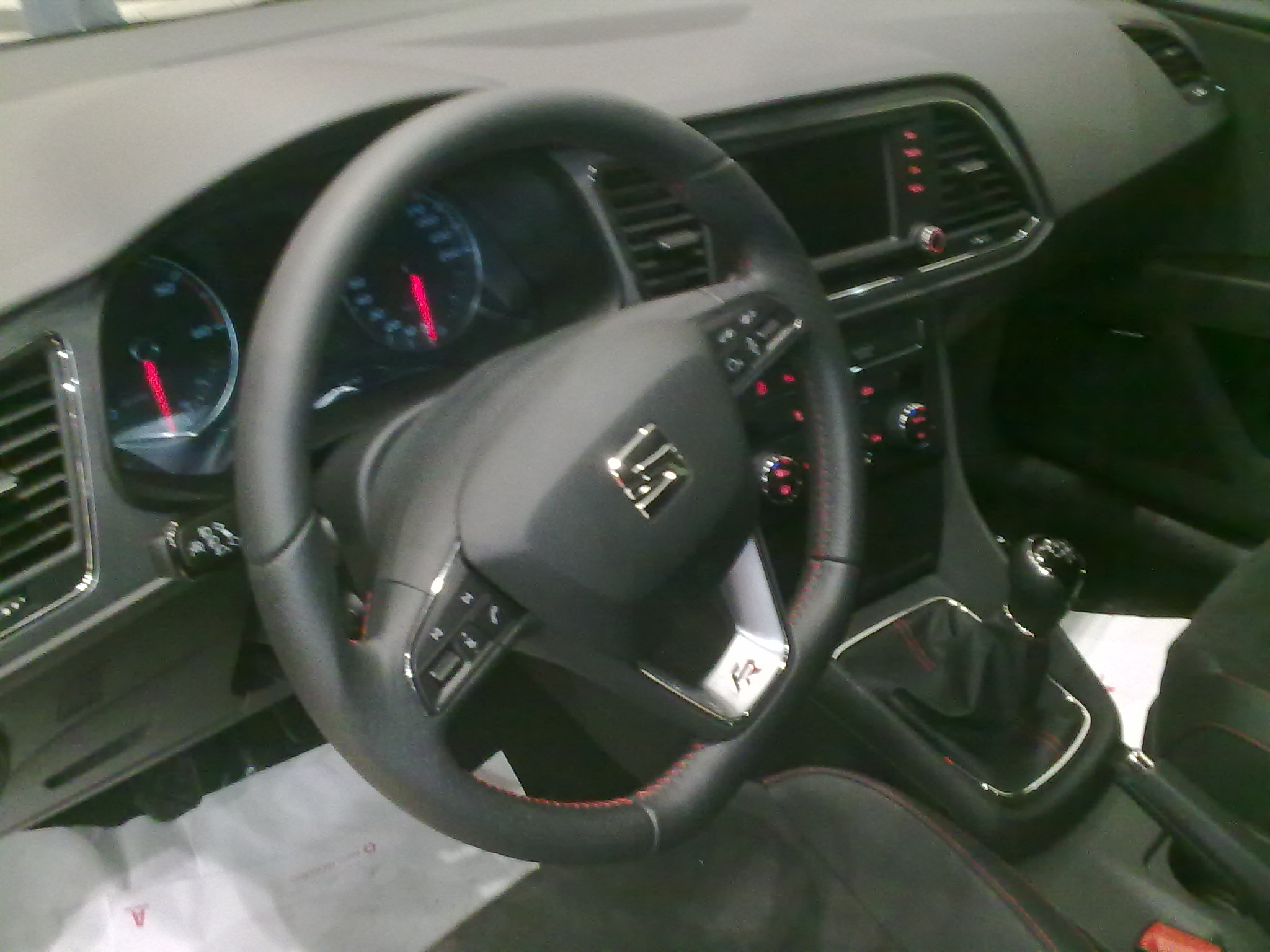
Interior

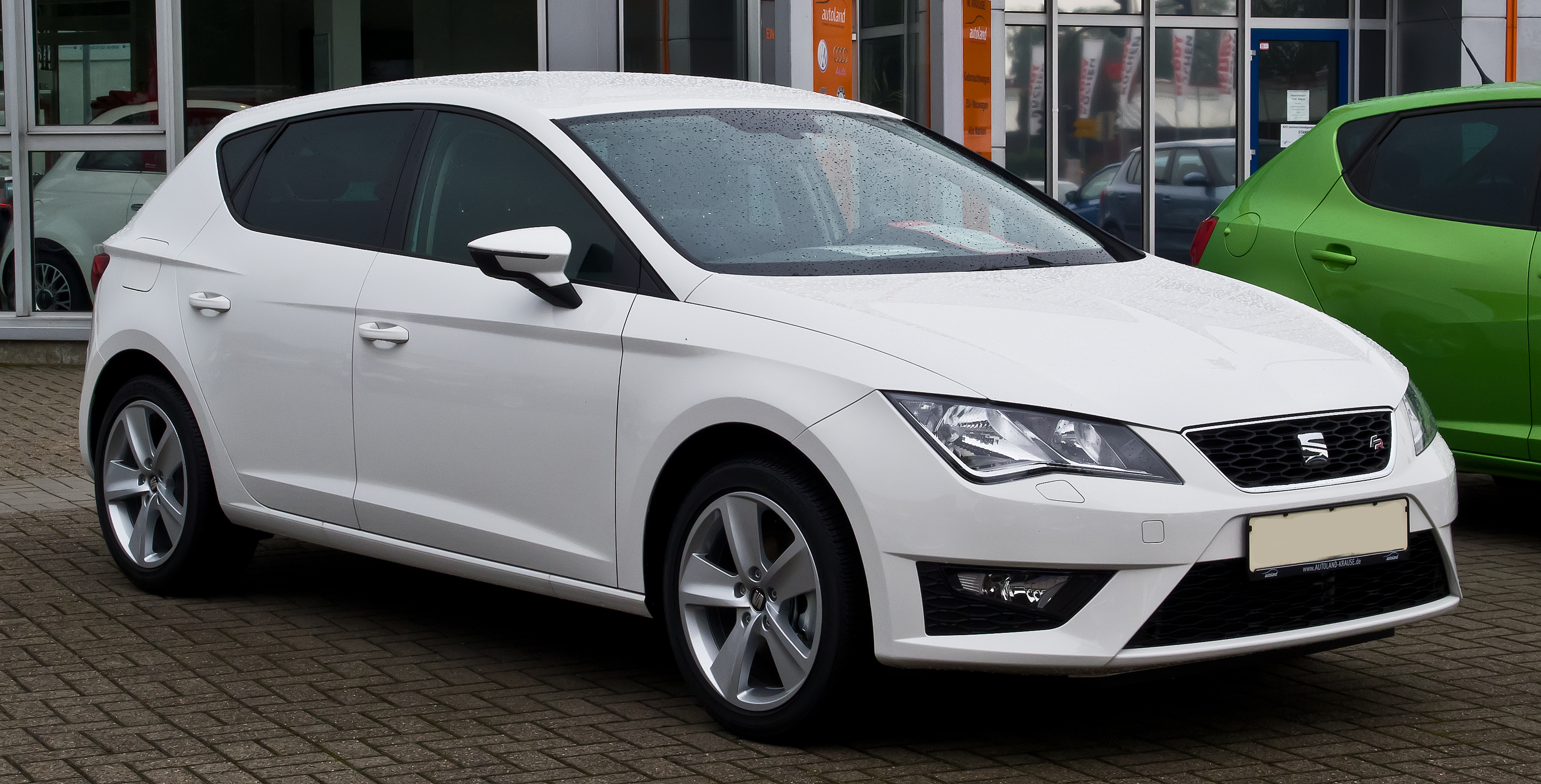
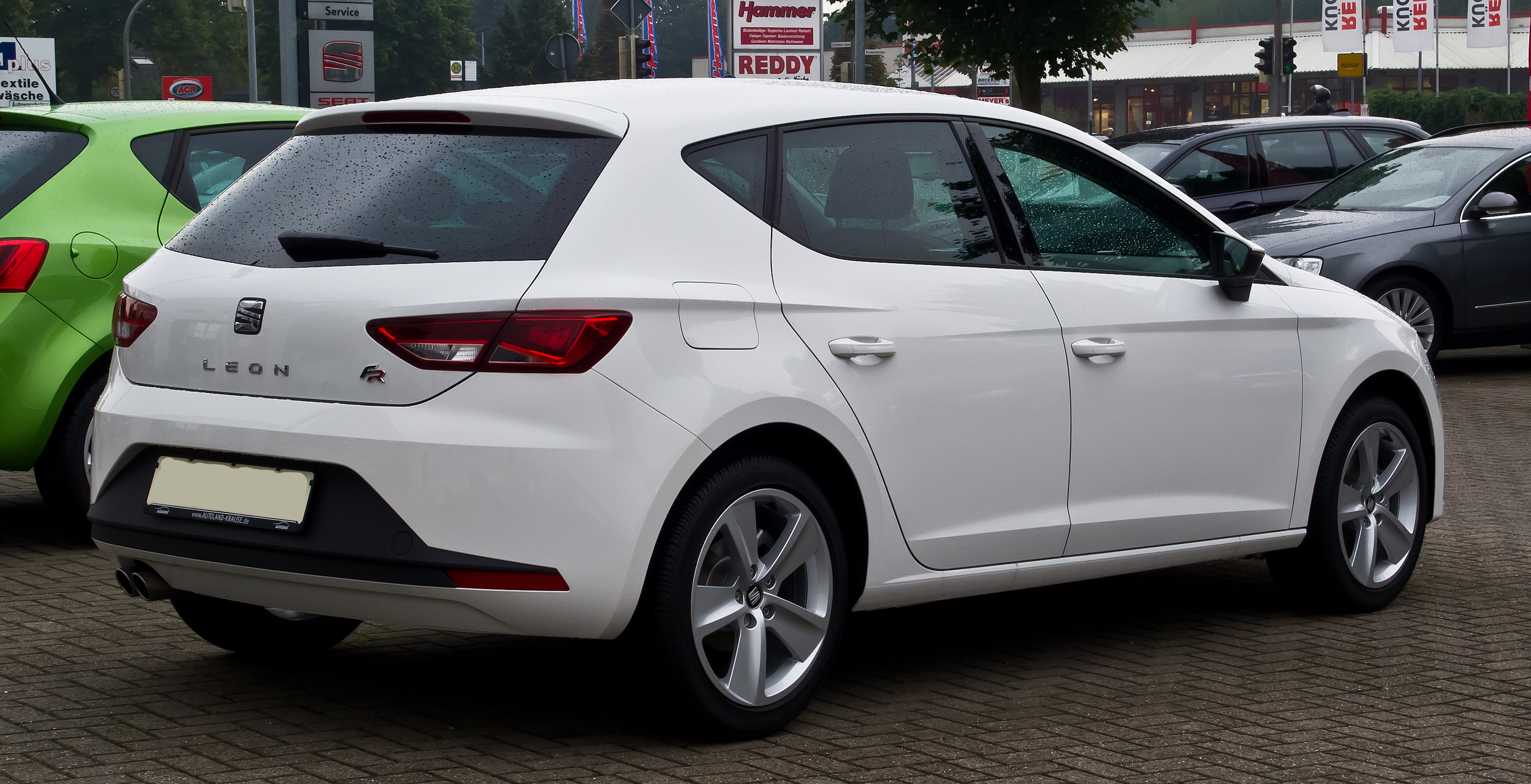

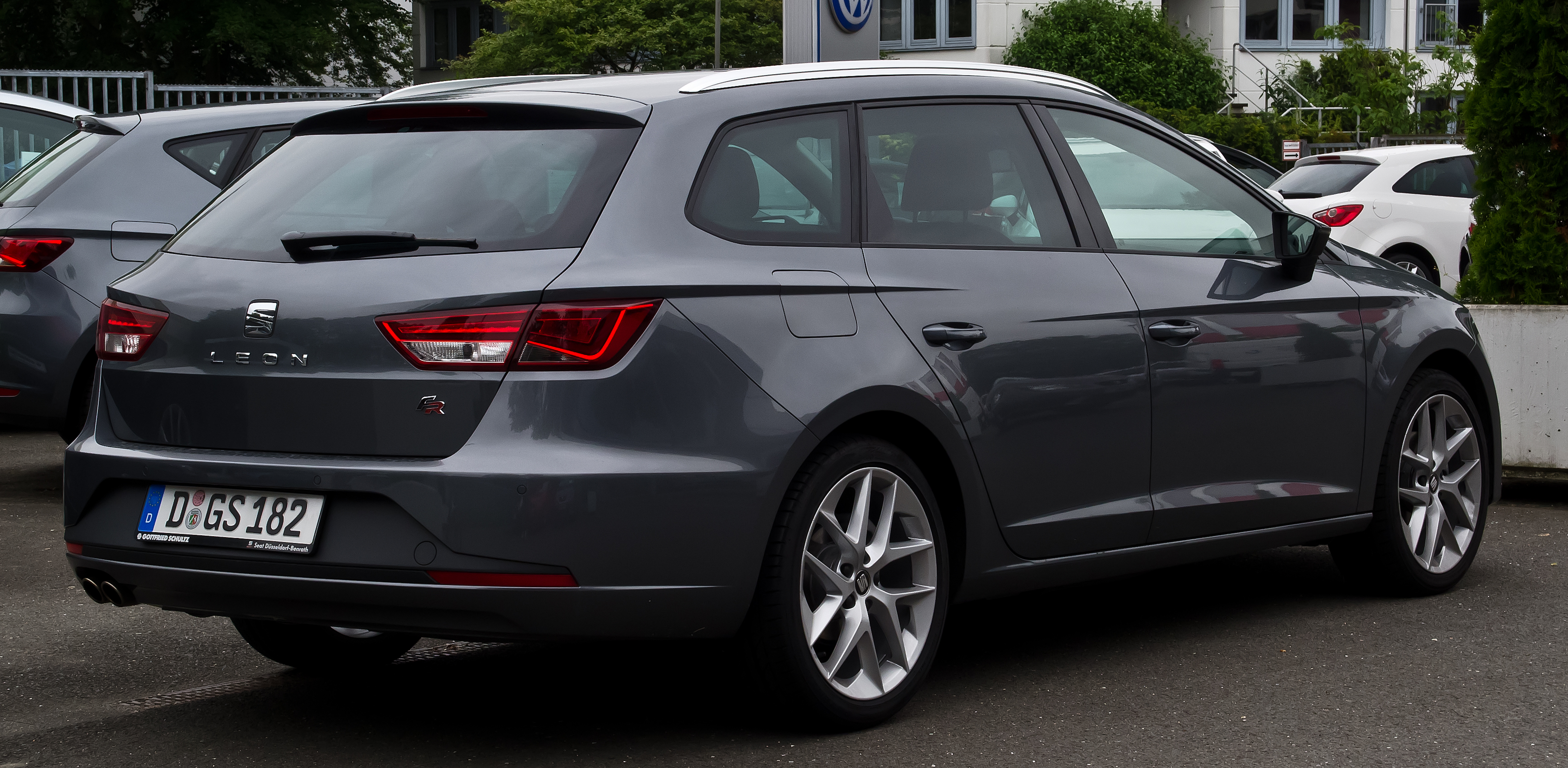
SEAT León FR Pre-facelift

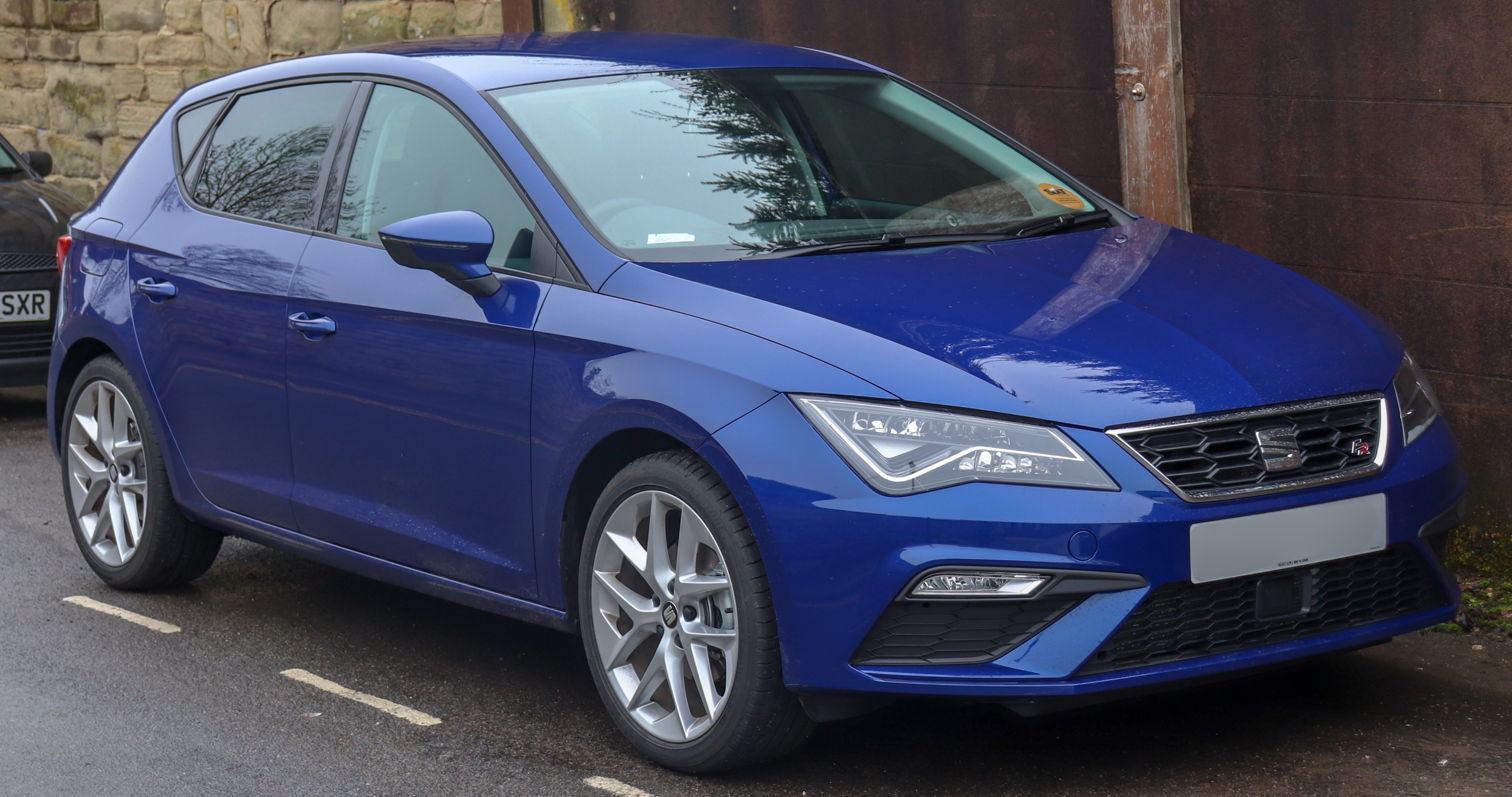

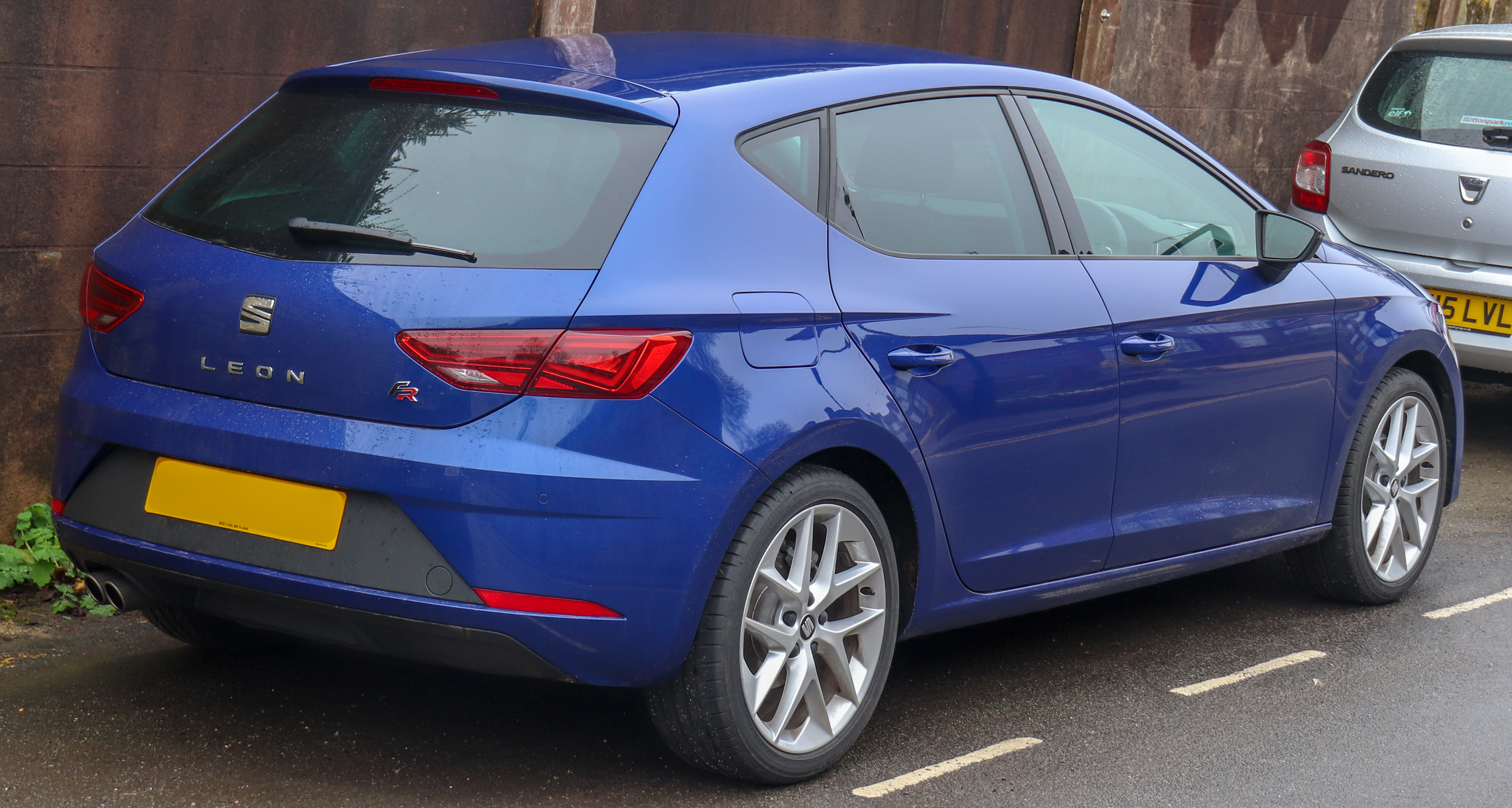
SEAT León FR (Facelift)

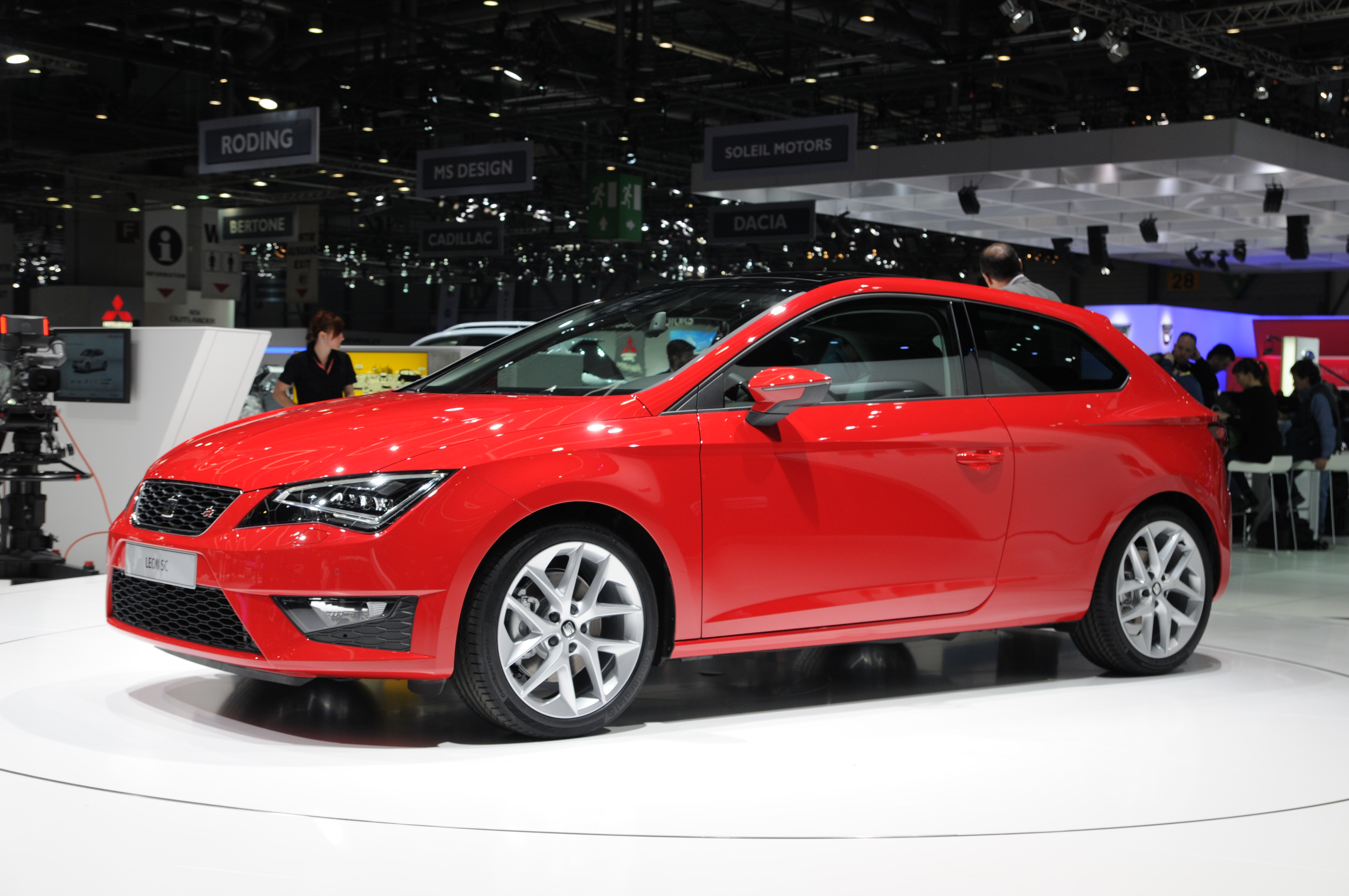
Pre-facelift Seat León SC

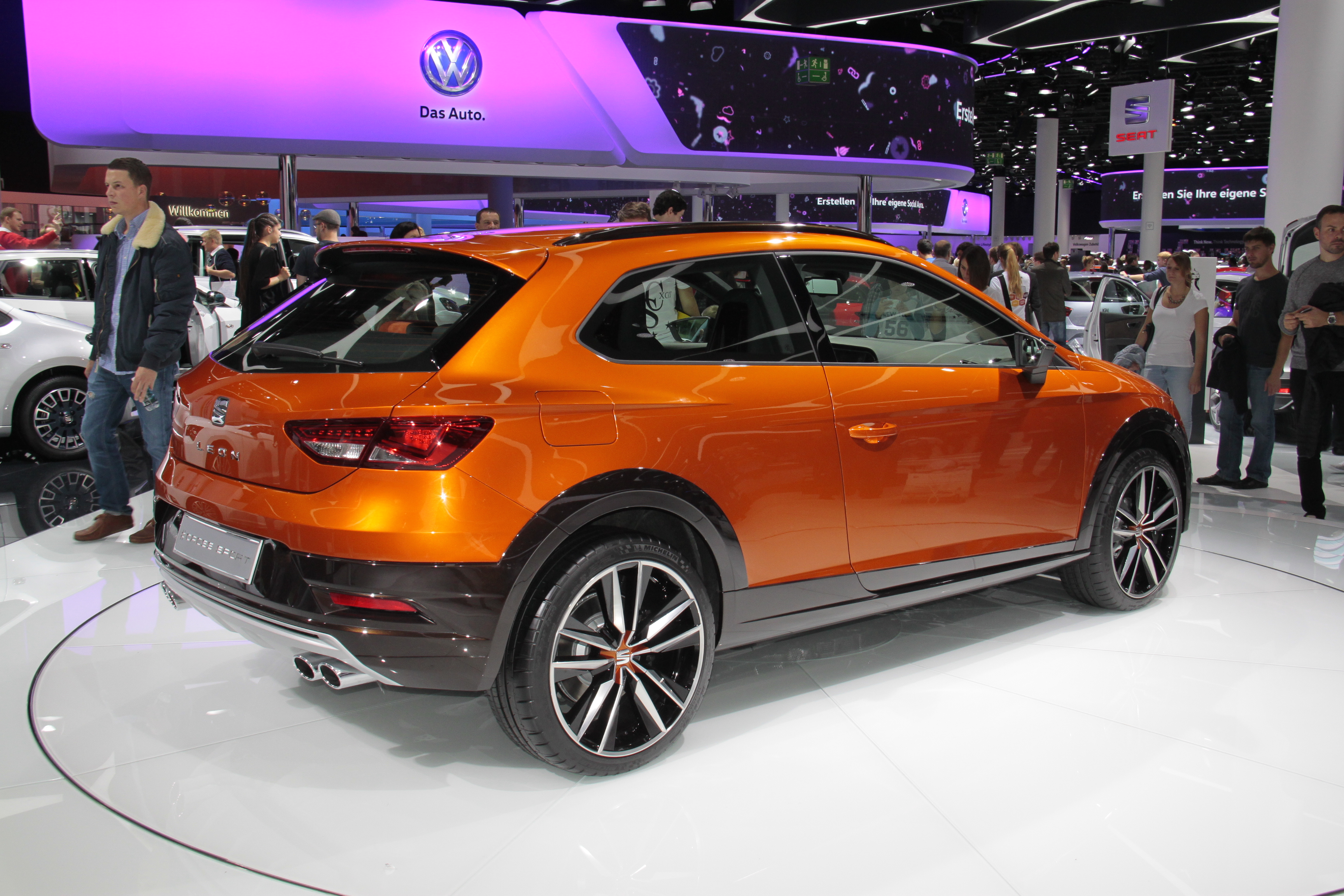
Seat León Cross Sport Concept

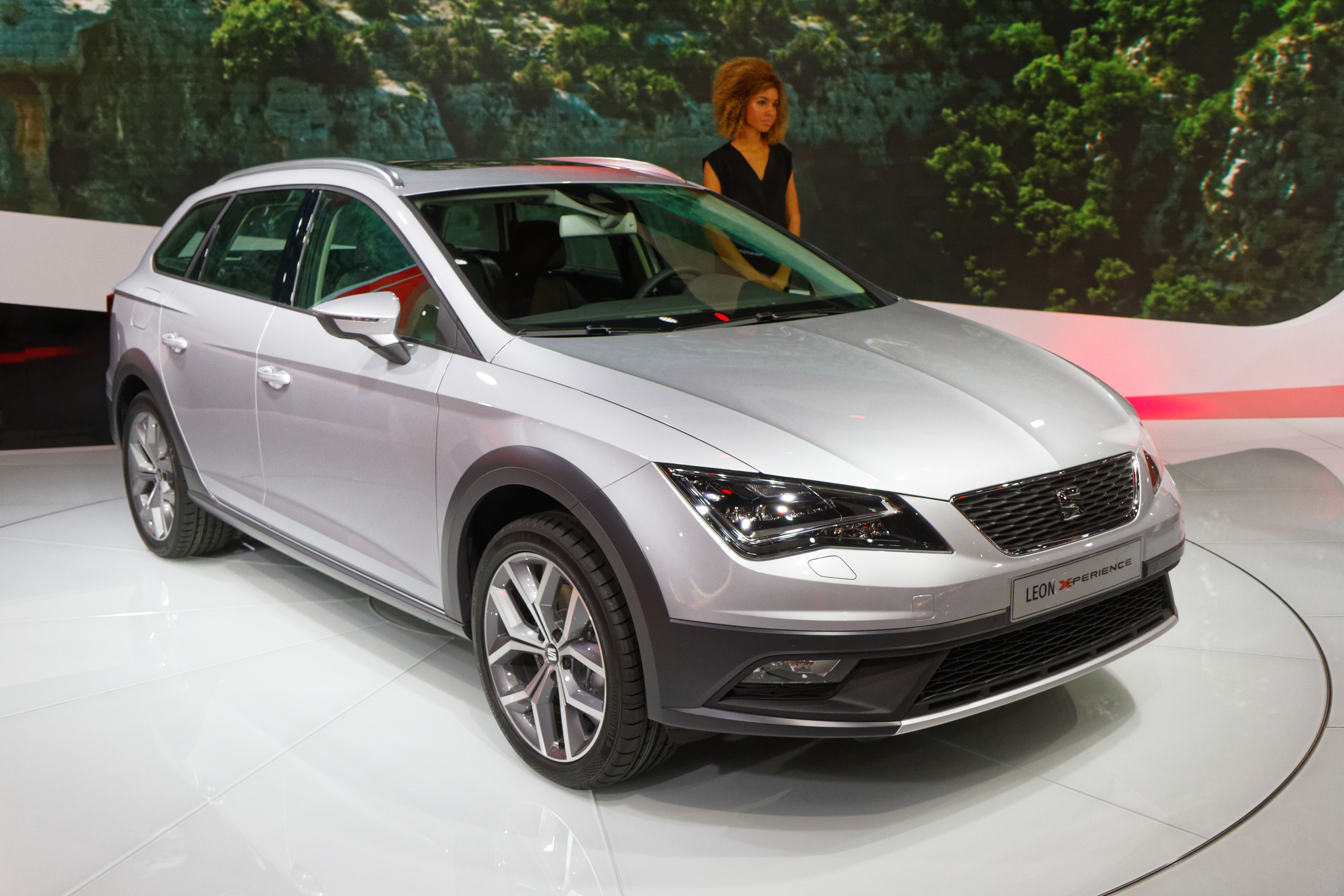
Seat León X-Perience (Pre-facelift)

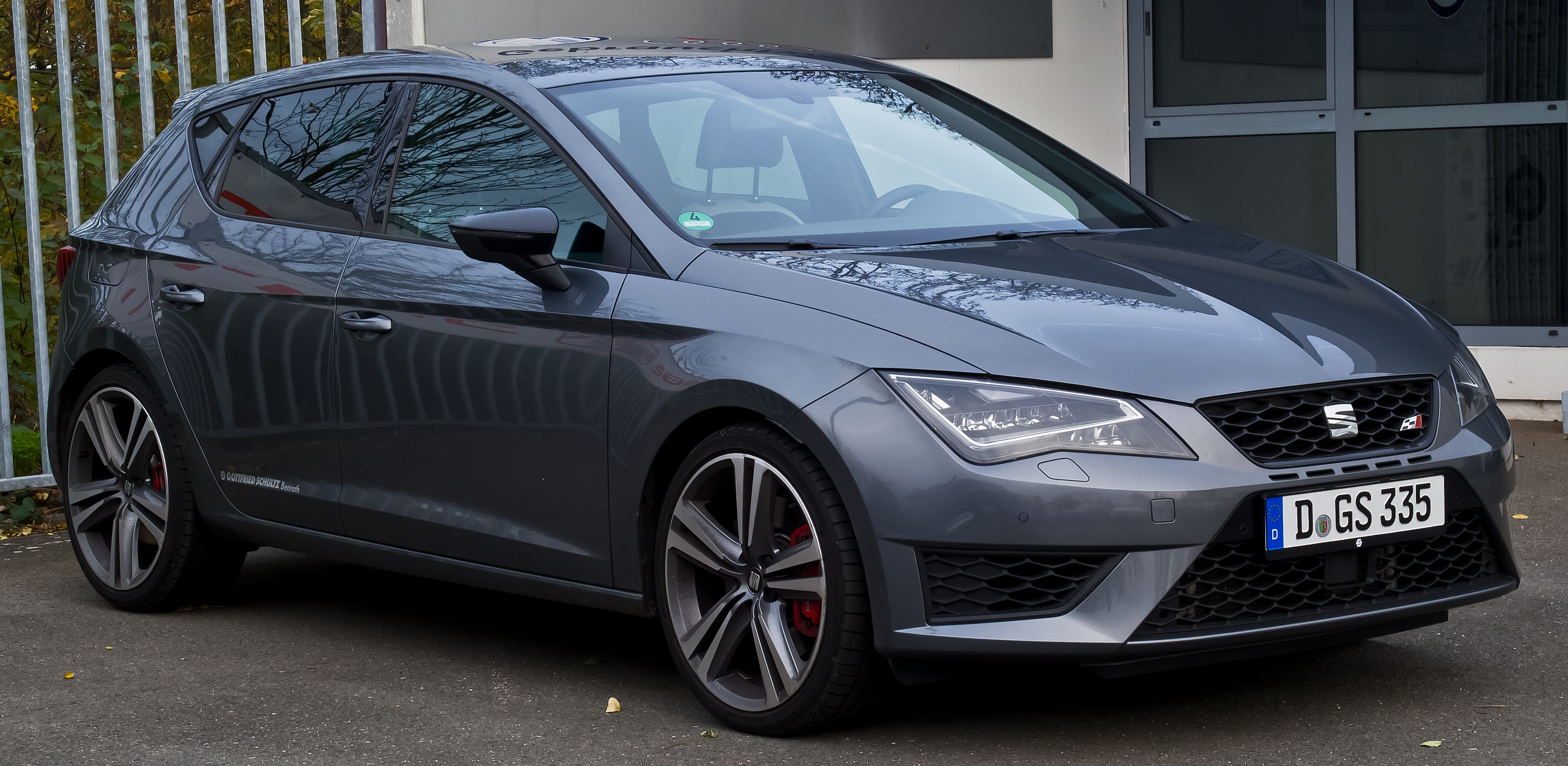
SEAT León Cupra 280

The third generation of the León is based on the Volkswagen Group's latest MQB platform, which is shared with the seventh generation Volkswagen Golf.

Compared to the previous generation, the León Mk3 is shorter by 5 cm (2 in) and lighter by up to 90 kg (198 lb); however, because its wheelbase has been extended by 5.8 cm (2.3 in), it has a roomier cabin with greater shoulder room for the front and rear passengers, more rear legroom and 380 litres (13 cu ft) of boot space. The first official information and pictures of the car were released on 16 July 2012, with its public debut at the 2012 Paris Motor Show in September. It is the second car to be based on the MQB platform.

It features new safety equipment, such as driver knee airbag, and a number of new safety systems, including (often as standard) a multi-collision braking system to automatically brake the car after an accident in order to avoid a second collision, a lane-keeping assistant, and driver fatigue detection. The braking system includes a hill-start assistant.

In the interior, there is a driver-oriented centre console hosting a 5.8-inch touch-screen infotainment display with some models featuring a proximity sensor, also used in the Volkswagen Golf, as well as ambient lighting.

A new feature available for the first time in its class are the optional full-LED headlamps combined with a full beam assistant. The full-LED headlamps offer numerous advantages over standard halogen bulbs such as improved illumination, a close to daylight colour temperature, lower energy consumption and an extended service life. The front fog lights can include a cornering feature.

The higher specification also have a new "SEAT Drive Profile" system which allows the driver to choose between four different driving settings: eco, normal, sport, and an individual setting. This system controls the behaviour of the engine, steering, and DSG gearbox. Additionally, the 1.8 TSI 180PS and 2.0 TDI 184PS engine-equipped models will vary their engine sound via a sound actuator, as well as their interior ambient lighting between white (normal, eco and individual) and red (sport).

SEAT announced in early 2012 that the range would include for the first time three-door and estate models in addition to a five-door.

In September 2013, SEAT officially unveiled the León ST (estate model) at the Frankfurt Motor Show. The León ST extends the León's maximum load capacity to 1470 litres and is available in Europe in three different versions and eleven different engine options. On 23 June 2014, SEAT revealed an off-road version of the León ST called the X-PERIENCE.

In August 2018, SEAT discontinued the Léon SC due to lower demands for three-door hatchbacks.

=== Facelift ===
In January 2017, the León received a subtle facelift which included a reshaped front bumper with a grille that has been stretched by 40mm and features restyled LED headlights. New engine options available included a 115 bhp 1.0-litre three-cylinder turbo petrol and 115 bhp 1.6-litre diesel. Interior changes included an electric parking brake with Hill Hold Control (HHC) as standard, a larger eight-inch touchscreen infotainment system with Apple CarPlay, Android Auto and MirrorLink.

New safety systems included Traffic Sign Recognition, Pedestrian Protection System, and blind-spot warning systems. Also available was Traffic Jam Assist - which allows the León to accelerate and brake automatically in traffic jams up to 37 mph. "Kessy" - SEAT's keyless automatic locking and starting system was another upgrade available. A new flagship XCELLENCE trim level was also introduced.

=== León Cupra ===
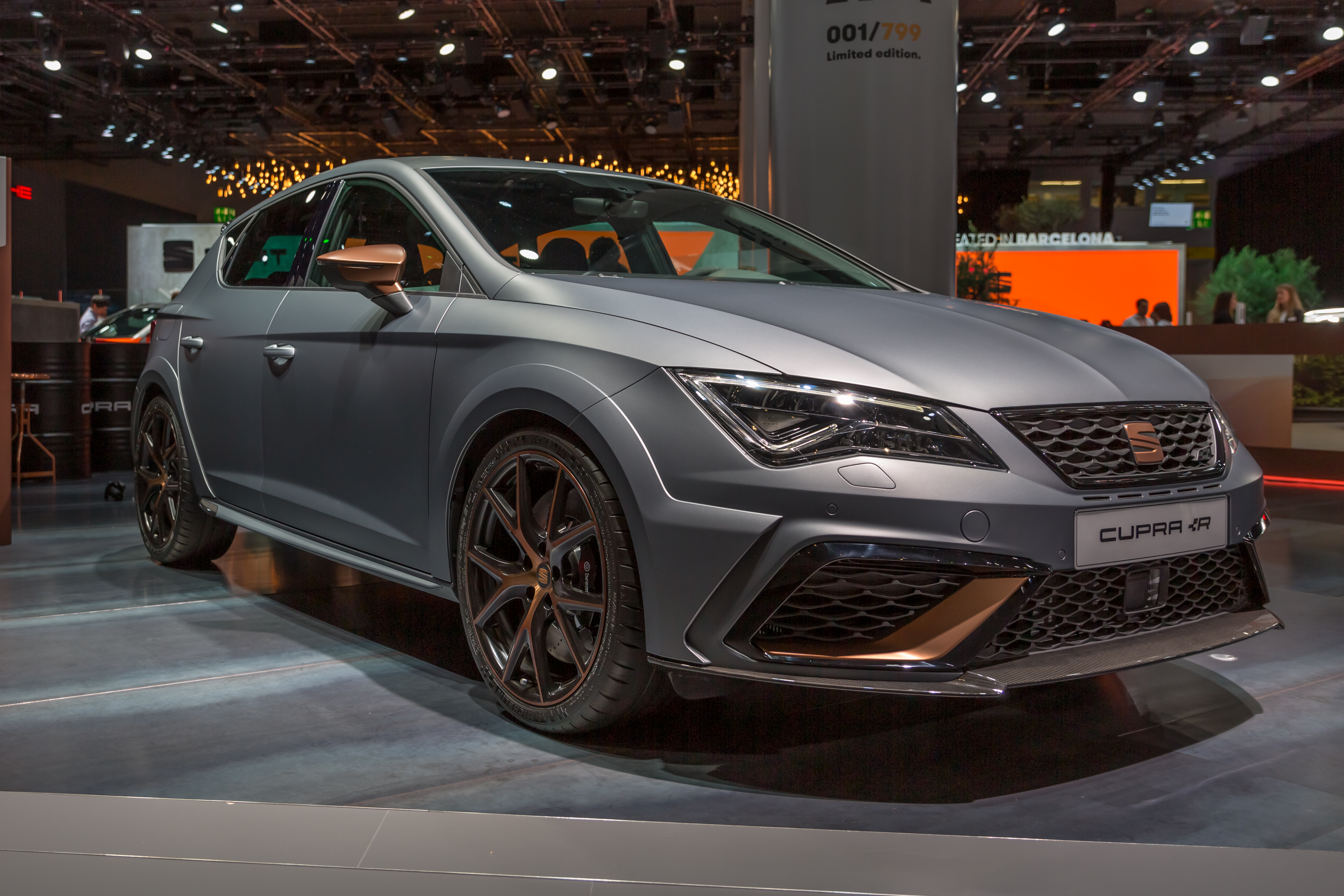
SEAT León Cupra R

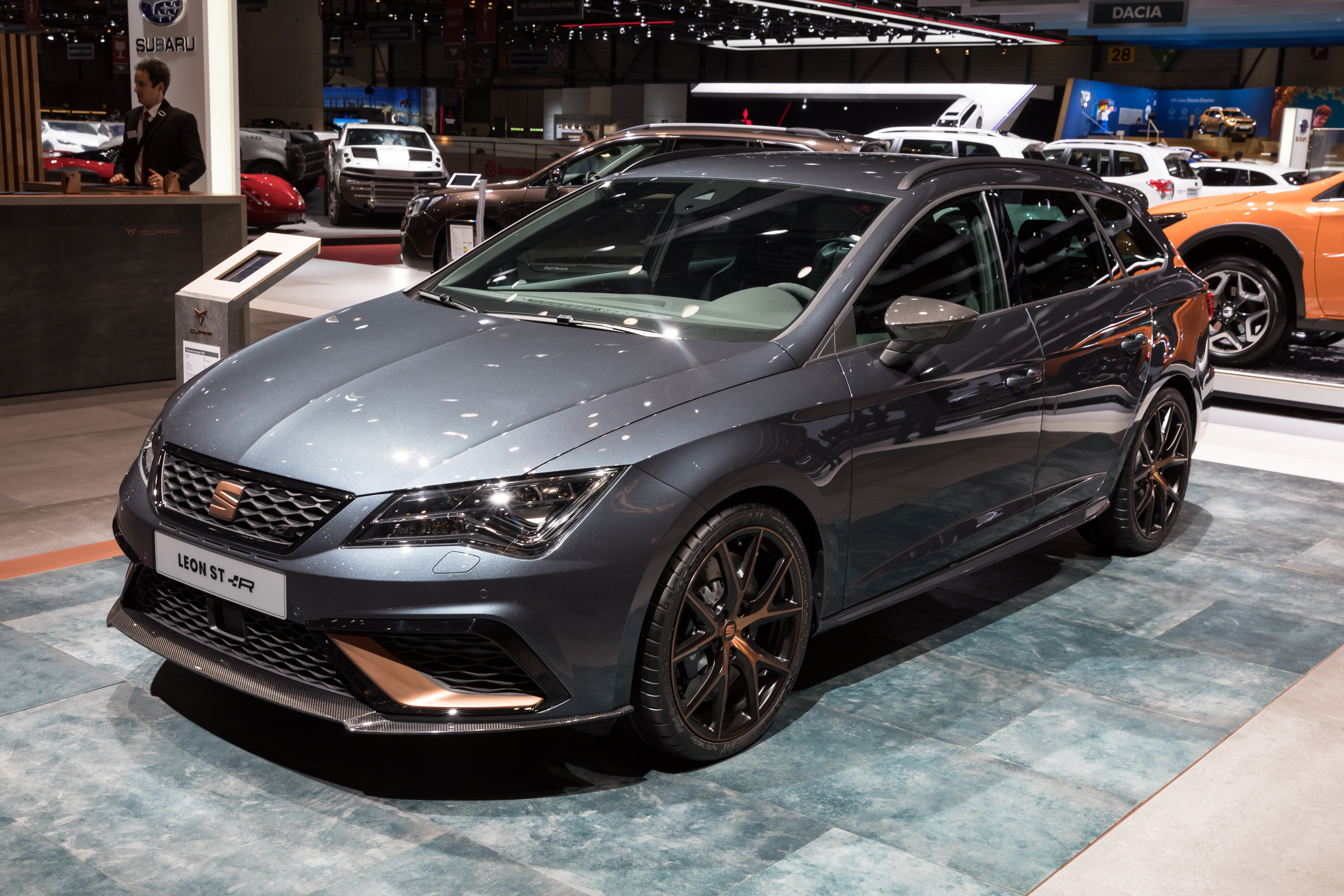
León Cupra R ST limited edition

SEAT León Cupra 265, was produced from 2014 to 2016, fitted with a turbocharged 265 PS (195 kW), 2-litre 16-valve, inline-four petrol engine, capable of 0-62 mph in 6.2 seconds and with a maximum speed of 250 km/h (155 mph). Available with a 6-speed manual gearbox or 6-speed DSG automatic gearbox.

SEAT León Cupra 280, was manufactured between 2014 and 2015, powered by a 280 PS (206 kW) version of the Cupra 265's engine, capable of 0-62 mph in 5.8 seconds and limited to 250 km/h (155 mph). Available with either a 6-speed manual gearbox or 6-speed DSG automatic gearbox. The 280 was fitted with 19-inch alloy wheels and Brembo brakes as standard.

The Sub8 Performance pack was launched in August 2014 for the Cupra 280, it featured side skirts, lightweight 19-inch alloy wheels and 30 mm larger ventilated brake discs with Brembo calipers. Michelin Pilot Sport Cup 2 tyres could be ordered at extra cost. Also included is a VAQ electronically controlled limited-slip differential that aids traction. Power remained unchanged at 280 hp (metric) and a 0-60 mph time of 5.7 seconds.

The Ultimate Sub8 pack was launched in February 2015 for the Cupra 280, which included several weight-saving measures including: removing the León's centre armrest, standard climate control system is replaced with a smaller heater, reducing the number of speakers from eight to four, removing the centre console armrest, front storage units, and rear air vents.

SEAT León Cupra 290, was manufactured between 2015 and 2016, as a replacement for Cupra 280 - powered by the same 2-litre engine from the Cupra 280, but with an extra 10 bhp. The Cupra 290 can accelerate 0-62 mph in 5.8 seconds and onto a top speed of 155 mph. Available with either a 6-speed manual gearbox or 6-speed DSG automatic gearbox. The 290 came in three body styles - three-door hatchback (León SC), five-door hatchback (León) and five-door estate (León ST) – and in a higher-specification Black version; which included sports seats, special 19in multi-spoke alloy wheels, and black detailing.

SEAT León Cupra 300, was manufactured between 2017–2018 to replace the Cupra 290, it used the same 2 Litre turbocharged engine from León Cupra 290 but boosted to 296 bhp and capable of 0-62 mph in 5.8 seconds. Available with either a 6-speed manual gearbox or 6-speed DSG automatic gearbox. ST estate version was fitted with a DSG gearbox and all-wheel drive as standard.

In response to new WLTP testing regimes, SEAT announced in 2018 that the León Cupra 300 would be replaced with a new León Cupra 290. Changes to the revised model included the addition of a gasoline particulate filter (GPF), and as the name suggests, gave the 2WD hatchback a 290 PS (213 kW) power output. The ST Estate retained its 300 PS power output, but was also fitted with a GPF system.

The León Cupra R is limited to 799 units based on the standard Cupra 300 but with an uprated 310 PS (228 kW) 2 Litre turbocharged engine; with a 0-62 mph time of 5.8 seconds and a top speed of 155 mph. Cupra Rs were available only with a six-speed manual gearbox in the UK and only 24 Right Hand Drive units have been built. External changes include exclusive 19-inch alloy wheels, reprofiled bumpers with larger front intakes, flared side skirts, and carbon fibre front splitter, side skirts, rear diffuser and roof-mounted spoiler and matte bronzer accent over the externals.

=== Safety ===
In 2012, the SEAT León Mk3 was tested for its safety performance under the Euro NCAP assessment scheme and it achieved a 5-star overall rating:

Test	Score	Points
Overall:	5/5 stars	N/A
Adult occupant:	94%	30
Child occupant:	92%	40
Pedestrian:	70%	25
Safety assist:	71%	5

In 2013, the Spanish-made SEAT León Mk3 in its most basic Latin American market configuration was tested for its safety performance under the Latin NCAP 1.0 assessment scheme and it achieved 5 stars for adult occupants and 4 stars for toddlers:

Latin NCAP 1.5 test results Seat Leon + 6 Airbags (2013, similar to Euro NCAP 2002)
Test	Points	Stars
Adult occupant:	14.52/17.0	5 /5 stars
Child occupant:	38.55/49.00	4 /5 stars

In 2015, the Spanish-made SEAT León ST in its most basic Latin American market configuration was tested for its safety performance under the Latin NCAP 1.0 assessment scheme and it achieved 5 stars for adult occupants and 5 stars for toddlers:

Latin NCAP 1.5 test results Seat Leon ST + 6 Airbags (2013, similar to Euro NCAP 2002)
Test	Points	Stars
Adult occupant:	14.71/17.0	5 /5 stars
Child occupant:	43.39/49.00	5 /5 stars

=== Awards ===
- Euro NCAP advanced reward for SEAT's Multi Collision Brake system
- Euro NCAP advanced reward for SEAT's Lane Assist system

=== Special editions ===
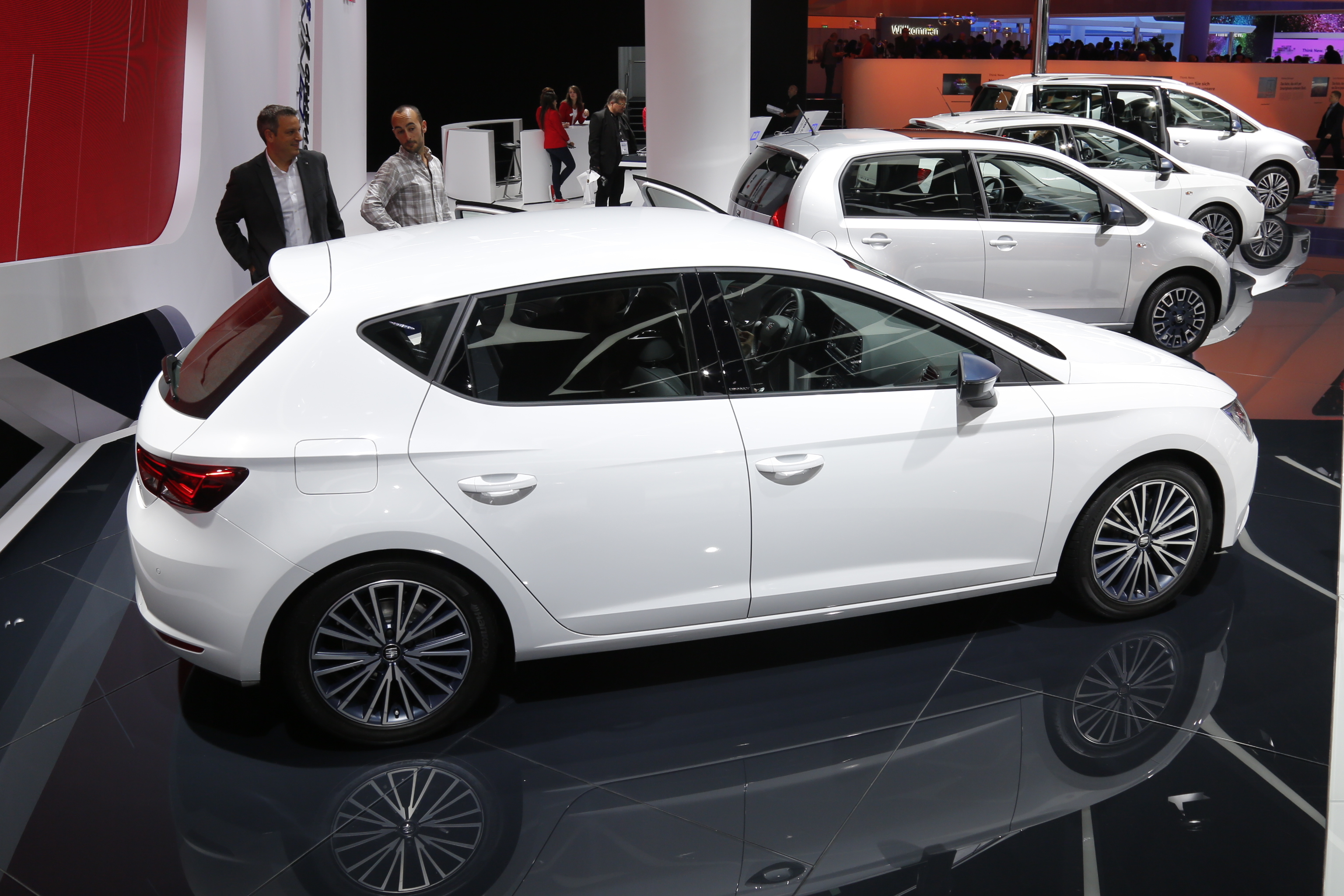
A white SEAT León CONNECT edition at the Frankfurt Motor Show

==== León CONNECT ====
The SEAT León CONNECT is a special edition model that was released in 2015. It is equipped with SEAT's Full Link Technology and a Samsung Galaxy A3 smartphone. This technology allows the user's phone to be connected to the car's infotainment system and gives the user access to all the features of the SEAT ConnectApp. The SEAT León CONNECT has a range of exterior body colours that allow the mirrors and wheels to be customised. Interior details, including stitching are in Blue.

=== Limited editions ===
799 units of the SEAT León Cupra R were built in a limited production run. Among these units only 24 of them are Right Hand Drive models solely distributed to the United Kingdom Market only. All RHD models are only available in six-speed manual and the LHD models are also available in the six-speed DSG Gearbox.

SEAT León Cupra ST 300 Carbon Edition went on sale in 2018 with only 50 allocated for sale in the United Kingdom. Based on the León ST Cupra 300, the Carbon Edition is fitted with the same 296 bhp 2.0-litre four-cylinder petrol engine mated to a six-speed DSG gearbox and Haldex all-wheel-drive system. Capable of 0-62 mph in 4.9 seconds and a top speed that is limited to 155 mph. Only available in Monsoon Grey paintwork, while other new exterior touches include carbon front and rear diffusers, fibre side blades, and Cupra R 19-inch black and bright silver alloy wheels.

Seat León Cupra R Abt 4Drive ST was produced in 2019 and its 2lt engine power increased from 296 bhp to 345 bhp and 0-62 mph in 4.5 seconds; top speed is limited to 155 mph. The ABT upgrade includes a copper body kit, 19-inch alloy wheels, Brembo brakes, and quad exhausts; the front splitter and rear diffuser, side skirts, and roof-mounted spoiler are all finished in carbon fibre. A seven-speed dual-clutch automatic gearbox and four-wheel drive are fitted as standard. To improve cornering speed and handling performance, new uprights have been added that modifies the negative camber to 2 degrees, at the front and back. Only 150 were allocated for sale in the United Kingdom.

=== Engine specifications ===
The Typ 5F SEAT León is available with the following internal combustion engines all featuring direct injection and turbocharging, and like the previous generations they are shared with other marques of the Volkswagen Group:

Petrol engines
Model	Displacement	Series	Power	Torque	Years
1.2 TSI	1,197 cc I4		63 kW (86 PS; 84 bhp)	160 N⋅m (118 lbf⋅ft)	2012–2020
1.2 TSI	1,197 cc I4		77 kW (105 PS; 103 bhp)	175 N⋅m (129 lbf⋅ft)	2012–2014
1.2 TSI	1,197 cc I4		81 kW (110 PS; 109 bhp)	175 N⋅m (129 lbf⋅ft)	2014–2020
1.4 TSI	1,395 cc I4		92 kW (125 PS; 123 bhp)	200 N⋅m (148 lbf⋅ft)	2012–2020
1.4 TSI	1,395 cc I4		103 kW (140 PS; 138 bhp)	250 N⋅m (184 lbf⋅ft)	2012–2014
1.4 TSI	1,395 cc I4	CZEA	110 kW (150 PS; 148 bhp)	250 N⋅m (184 lbf⋅ft)	2014–2018
1.5 EcoTSI	1,498 cc I4		110 kW (150 PS; 148 bhp)	250 N⋅m (184 lbf⋅ft)	2018–2020
1.8 TSI	1,798 cc I4	CJSA	132 kW (179 PS; 177 bhp)	250 N⋅m (184 lbf⋅ft)	2013–2020
2.0 EcoTSI	1,984 cc I4	CVKB	140 kW (190 PS; 188 bhp)	320 N⋅m (236 lbf⋅ft)	2017–2019
2.0 TSI Cupra	1,984 cc I4	CJXE	195 kW (265 PS; 261 bhp)	350 N⋅m (258 lbf⋅ft)	2014–2015
2.0 TSI Cupra	1,984 cc I4	CJXA	206 kW (280 PS; 276 bhp)	350 N⋅m (258 lbf⋅ft)	2014–2015
2.0 TSI Cupra	1,984 cc I4	CJXH	213 kW (290 PS; 286 bhp)	350 N⋅m (258 lbf⋅ft)	2015–2017
2.0 TSI Cupra	1,984 cc I4	CJXC	221 kW (300 PS; 296 bhp)	380 N⋅m (280 lbf⋅ft)	2017–2020
2.0 TSI Cupra R	1,984 cc I4	CJXG	228 kW (310 PS; 306 bhp)	380 N⋅m (280 lbf⋅ft)	2017–2018
Diesel engines
1.6 TDI	1,598 cc I4	CLHB	66 kW (90 PS; 89 bhp)	230 N⋅m (170 lbf⋅ft)	2012–2020
1.6 TDI	1,598 cc I4	CLHA	77 kW (105 PS; 103 bhp)	250 N⋅m (184 lbf⋅ft)	2012–2020
2.0 TDI	1,968 cc I4	CKFC	110 kW (150 PS; 148 bhp)	320 N⋅m (236 lbf⋅ft)	2012–2020
2.0 TDI FR	1,968 cc I4	CUNA	135 kW (184 PS; 181 bhp)	380 N⋅m (280 lbf⋅ft)	2013–2020

== Fourth generation (KL1/KL8; 2020) ==
SEAT León Mk4
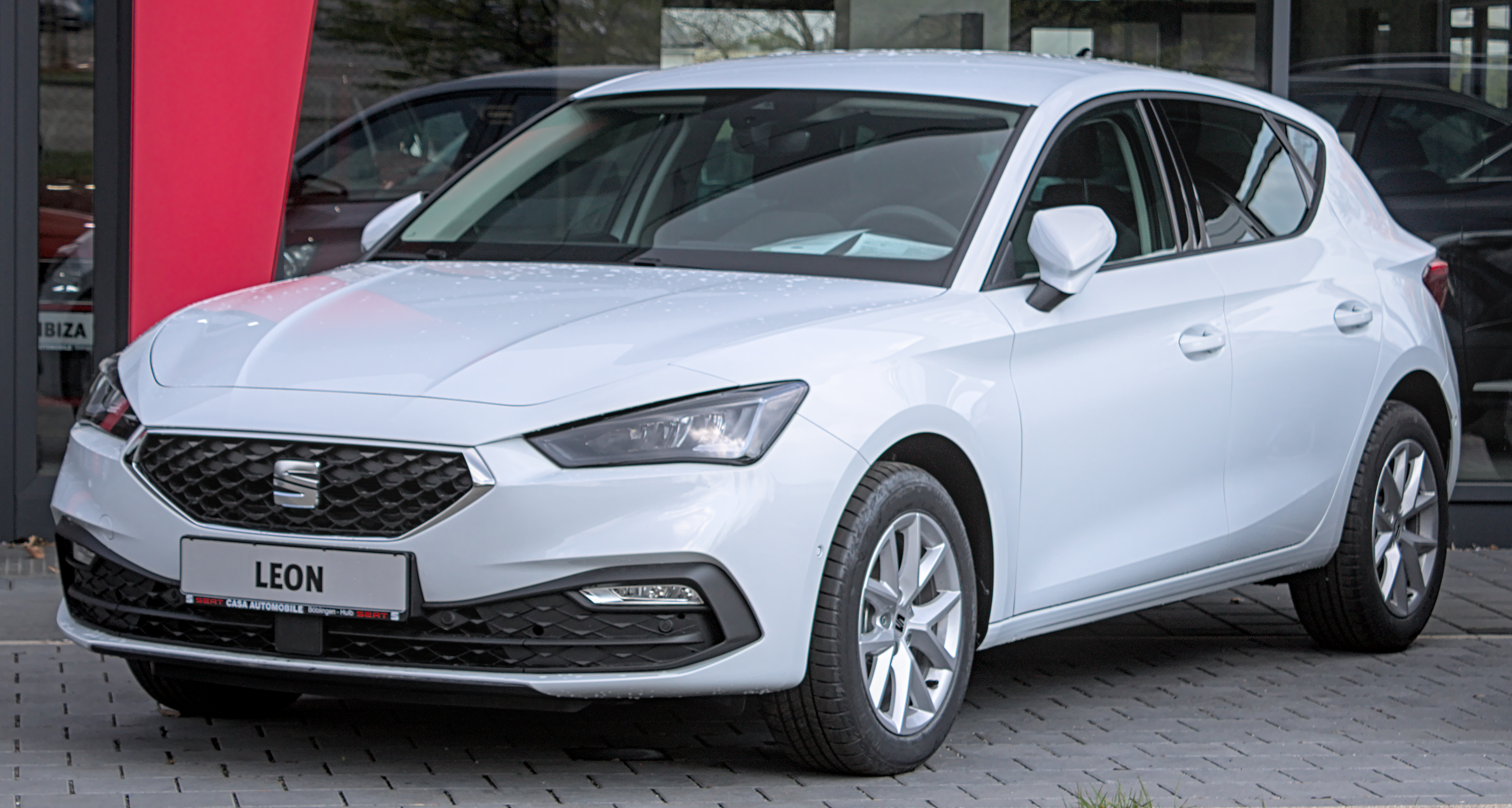
- SEAT León Mk4

Overview
- Model code: KL1/KL8
- Also called: Cupra León
- Production: January 2020–present
- Assembly: Spain: Martorell, Catalonia
- Designer: Dani García (exterior); David Jofre (interior) under Alejandro Mesonero-Romanos

Body and chassis
- Platform: Volkswagen Group MQB Evo
- Related: Cupra Formentor; Volkswagen Golf Mk8; Audi A3 Mk4; Škoda Octavia Mk4

Powertrain
- Engine: Petrol: 1.0 L EA211 CHYB I3 TSI; 1.5 L EA211 Evo TSI I4; 2.0 L I4 TSI; Petrol/CNG: 1.5 L EA211 Evo TGI I4; Petrol hybrid: 1.0 L EA211 CHYB eTSI I3 (mild hybrid); 1.5 L EA211 Evo eTSI I4 (mild hybrid); 1.4 L EA211 TSI I4 (PHEV); Diesel: 2.0 L I4 TDI diesel
- Transmission: 5/6-speed manual 6/7-speed DSG

Dimensions
- Wheelbase: 2,686 mm (105.7 in)
- Length: 4,368 mm (172.0 in); 4,642 mm (182.8 in) (ST)
- Width: 1,800 mm (70.9 in)
- Height: 1,456 mm (57.3 in); 1,448 mm (57.0 in) (ST)
- Kerb weight: 1,286–1,426 kg (2,835–3,144 lb)

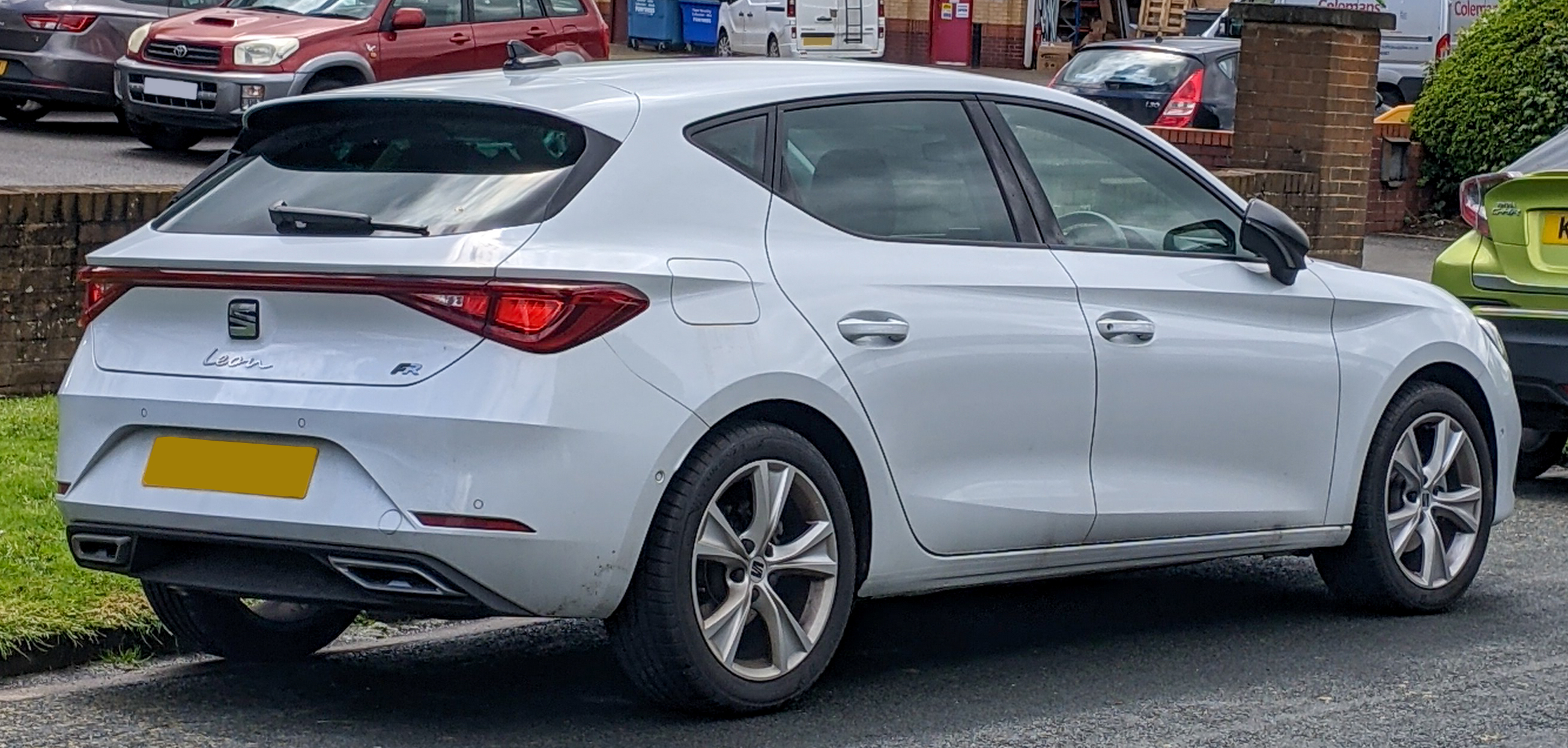
Rear view

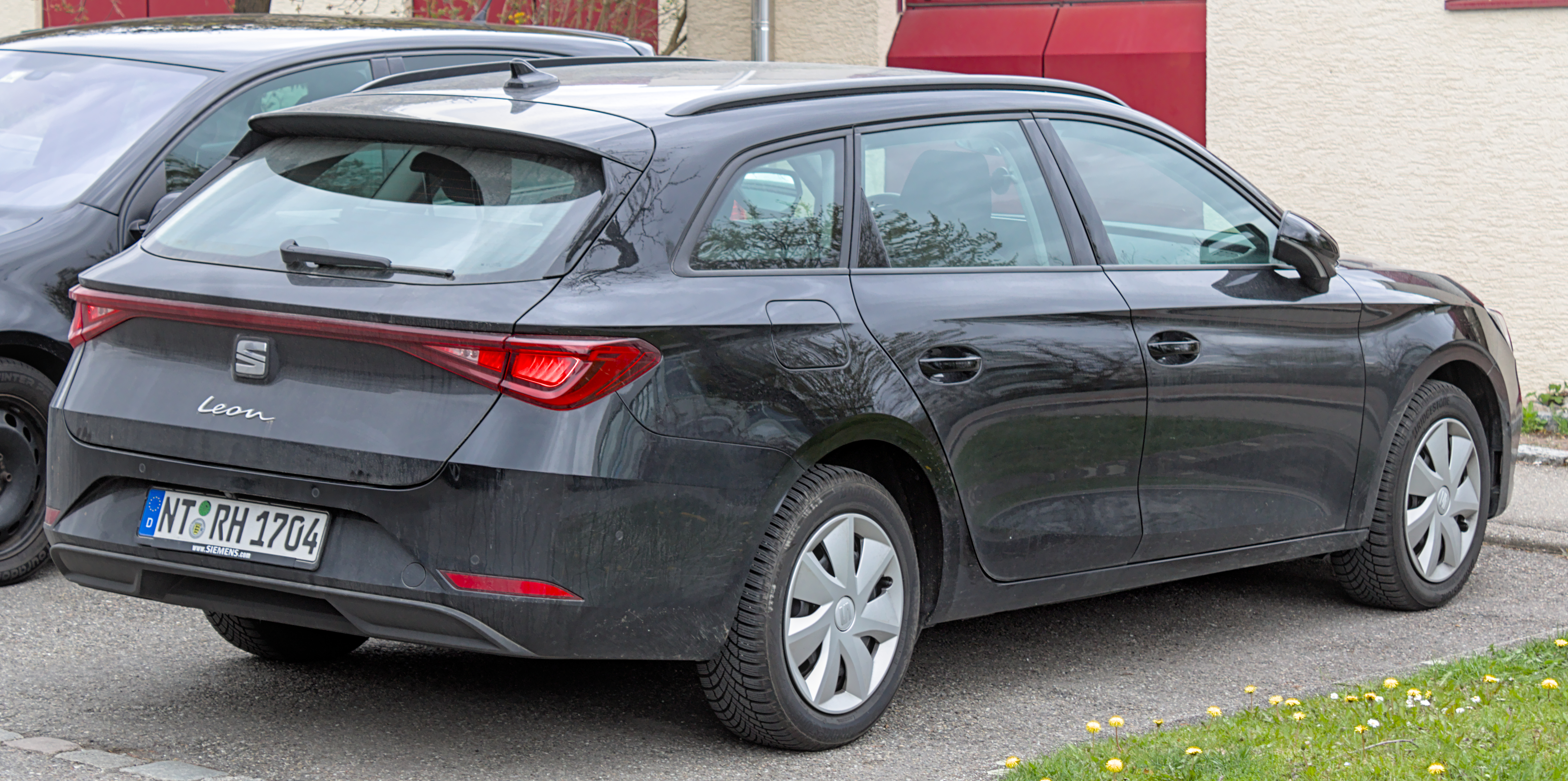
SEAT León ST

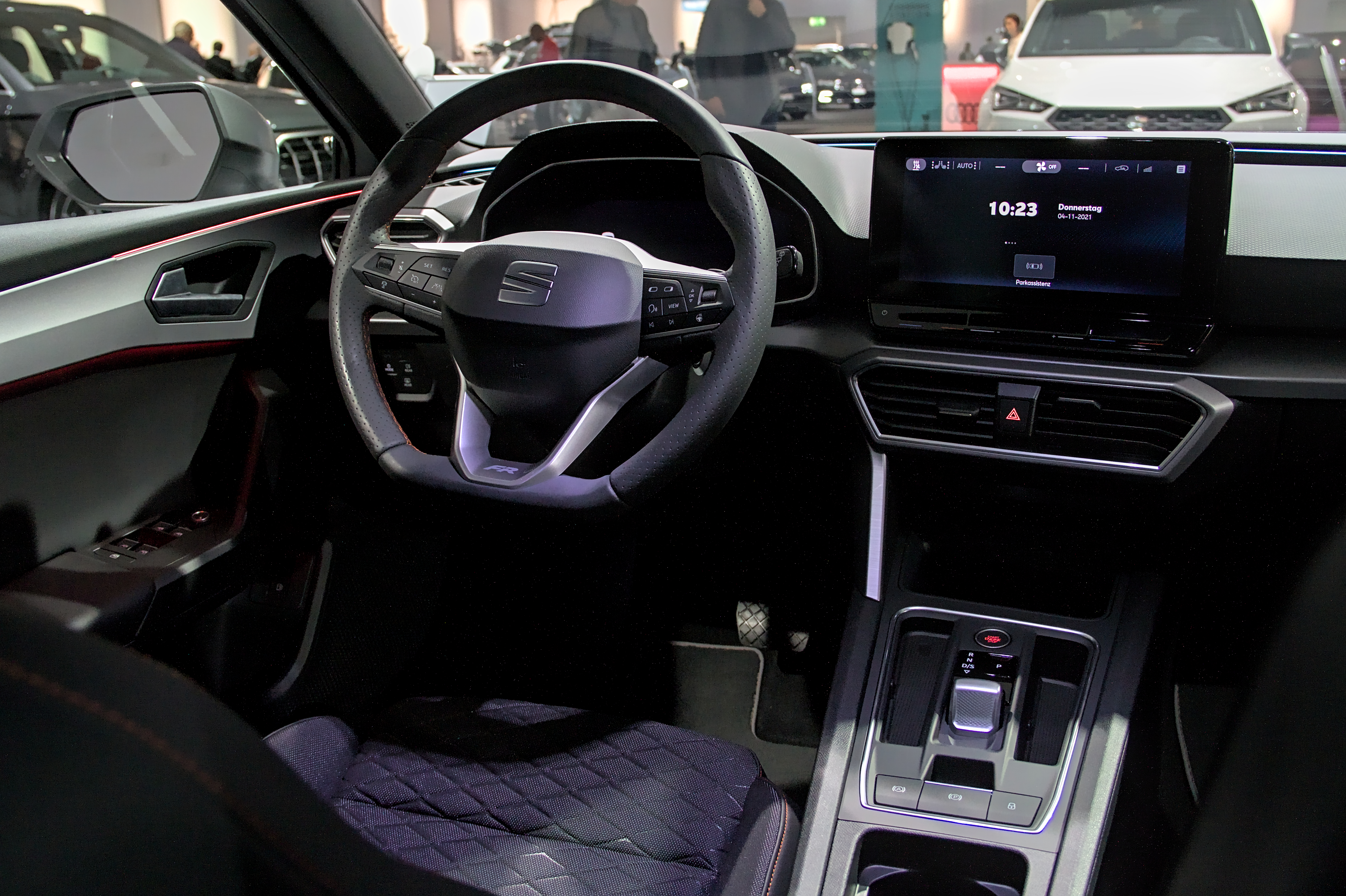
Interior

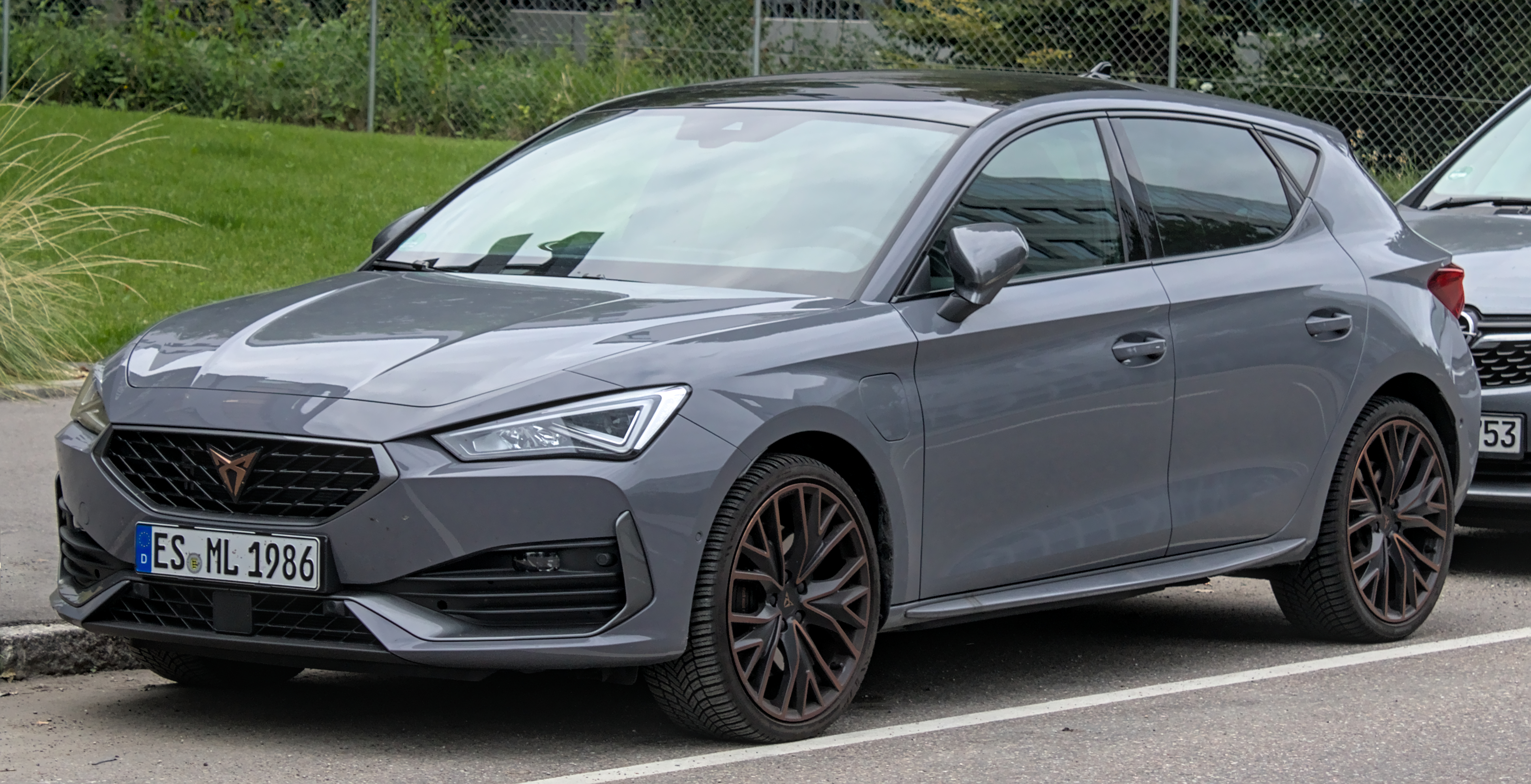
Cupra León

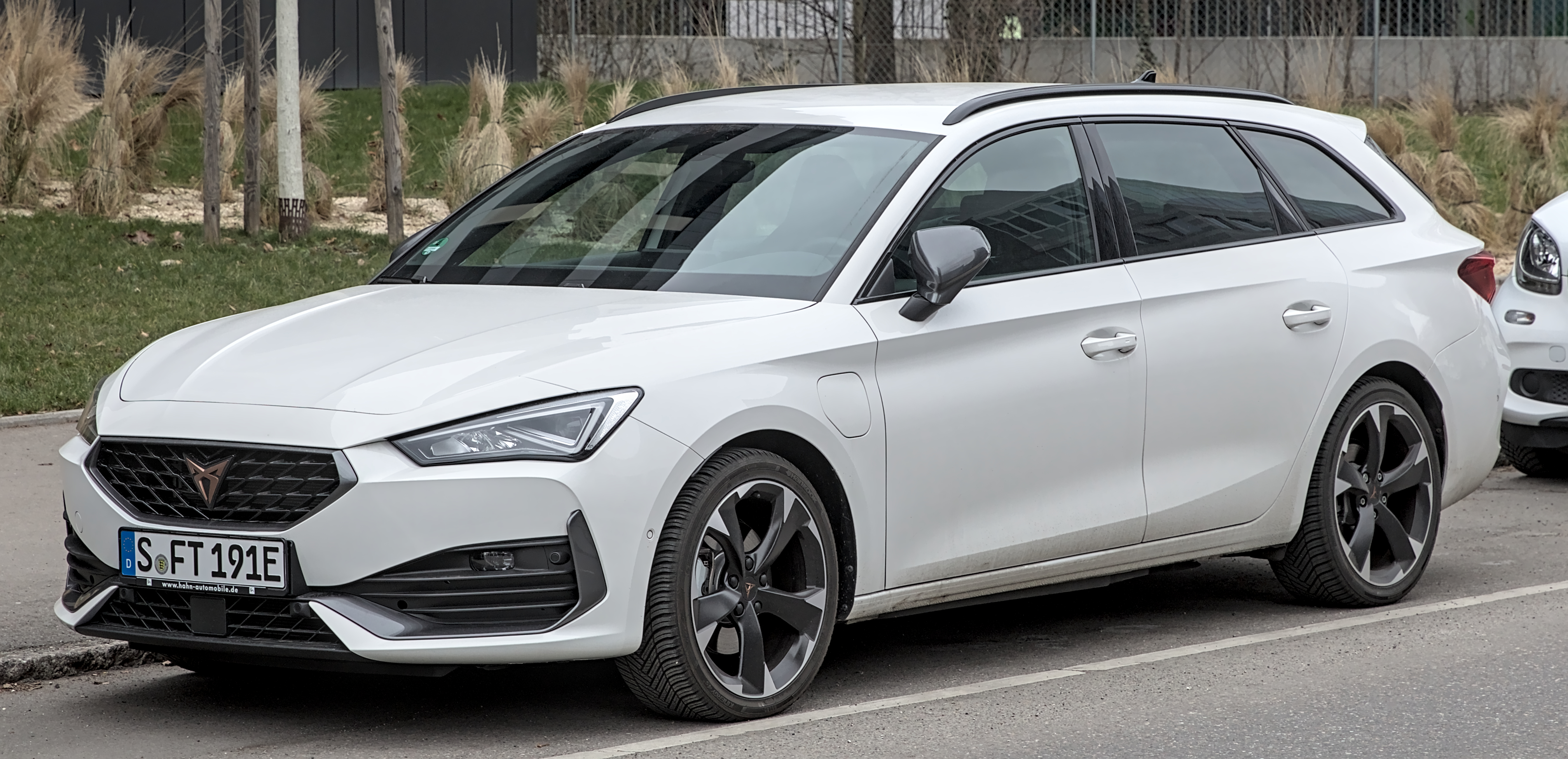
Cupra León ST

A fourth generation of León was presented on 28 January 2020. It shares the MQB platform with the Volkswagen Golf Mk8, Skoda Octavia Mk4 and Audi A3 Mk4. It has an all digital cluster, is full LED-Light equipped and is configurable with petrol, diesel, mild hybrid, and, plug-in hybrid engines.

The fourth-generation León is 16mm narrower and 90mm longer than the previous generation of León. The five-door León boot capacity of 380 litres has remained unchanged, and the Estate's storage is increased by 30 litres to 617 litres compared to the previous generation.

Engine options are two petrol TSI engines – a 1-litre three-cylinder producing 108 bhp and a 1.5-litre four-cylinder with either 128 bhp or 148 bhp. The TDI diesel option is a 2-litre producing either 113 bhp or 148 bhp.

Also available is a (CNG) compressed natural gas 1.5 litre TGI unit that produces 96 kW/130PS of power giving the CNG-powered SEAT León a CNG range of 440 km (273 miles). When CNG tanks are depleted, the engine switches automatically to run on petrol until the next CNG refuelling.

The eTSI mild hybrid has a 48V electric motor and is available with either the 109 bhp 1-litre or 148 bhp 1.5 litre petrol engine. The system allows the León to coast with the engine switched off during some driving scenarios and recover energy under braking which is then stored in a 48V lithium-ion battery.

The Plug-in Hybrid (eHybrid) 1.4-litre TSI petrol engine electric motor with a 13kWh lithium-ion battery to produce 150 kW/204PS of power, switching to petrol only when its battery needs recharging to produce an electric-only 60 km (38 miles) range. Charging is quoted at just 3.5 hours via a 3.6 kW AC socket; it takes 6 hours to charge it from a 230V socket. To date, this is the most powerful SEAT ever produced that does not wear a Cupra badge. It is the only León in the range to have rear multilink suspension and, when ordered in FR trim, it forgoes the 15mm lower suspension.

The engines can be chosen with a six-speed manual, a six-speed DSG (direct-shift gearbox) automatic transmission or 7-speed DSG automatic transmission on smaller engines that have a torque output of up to 250Nm/184 lb ft. The 7-speed dual-clutch automatic transmission's dry clutch technology results in weight savings, reduced fuel consumption and emissions.

Standard equipment include: "KESSY" automatic locking and starting system, electronic parking brake, an eight-inch infotainment system, two USB ports, LED headlights with automatic high beam, electric and heated side mirrors, cloth upholstery, leather steering wheel and gear stick, and SEAT Connect.

The León is available in seven trim levels, starting with: SE with 16" alloy wheels, 8.25" touchscreen media system and rear parking sensors; SE Dynamic adds 17" alloys wheels, digital Cockpit, 10" touchscreen media system and Park assist (including front and rear parking sensor); FR adds FR Styling, sports suspension, automatic headlights, and Rain sensing wipers; FR First Edition adds 18" alloy wheels, predictive & adaptive cruise control, rear view camera, and wireless phone charger; FR Sport adds heated front seats, Lane Assist and rear tinted windows; XCELLENCE adds microsuede upholstery and KESSY Advanced (keyless entry and start); and XCELLENCE Lux adds 18" Aerodynamic Performance alloy wheels, leather upholstery and interior wraparound lighting.

=== Safety ===
Standard equipment include: Blind Spot Detection, Exit Assist (alerts driver to any approaching vehicles visually and acoustically; stopping the car if necessary), Collision Assist (if an imminent collision is detected, sensors prepare the vehicle and its occupants by pre-tensioning seat belts and closing windows), Emergency Assist (if the driver seems inactive behind the wheel, it will activate the hazard lights, keep the car in its lane and then will apply the brakes until the car is brought to a gentle stop) and Predictive Adaptive Cruise Control.

Seven airbags, including a new standard front-central airbag that prevents possible head injuries between the driver and front passenger in the event of a side collision, became standard.

==== Euro NCAP ====
In 2020, the SEAT León Mk4 was tested for its safety performance under the Euro NCAP assessment scheme and it achieved a 5-star overall rating:

Test	Score	Points
Overall:	5/5 stars	N/A
Adult occupant:	92%	30
Child occupant:	88%	40
Pedestrian:	71%	25
Safety assist:	80%	5

Euro NCAP test results SEAT Leon 1.5 TSI 85kW hatchback (LHD) (2025)
Test	Points	%
Overall:	5 /5 stars	
Adult occupant:	35.3	88%
Child occupant:	42.4	86%
Pedestrian:	51.1	81%
Safety assist:	13.9	77%

==== ANCAP ====
ANCAP test results Seat Leon Sportstourer variant (NZ) (2020, aligned with Euro NCAP)
Test	Points	%
Overall:	5 /5 stars	
Adult occupant:	34.94	92%
Child occupant:	43.39	88%
Pedestrian:	38.49	71%
Safety assist:	12.83	80%

ANCAP test results Cupra Leon all variants exc. Extreme Package (2025, aligned with Euro NCAP)
Test	Points	%
Overall:	5 /5 stars	
Adult occupant:	35.29	88%
Child occupant:	42.20	86%
Pedestrian:	51.67	82%
Safety assist:	14.86	82%

ANCAP test results Cupra Leon (2020, aligned with Euro NCAP)
Test	Points	%
Overall:	5 /5 stars	
Adult occupant:	34.92	91%
Child occupant:	43.39	88%
Pedestrian:	38.49	71%
Safety assist:	12.83	80%

=== Technology ===
The León features digital cockpit on all but the basic model; Full Link technology with MirrorLink, Android Auto and Apple CarPlay - compatible with most smartphones on the market. The standard Infotainment system has an 8.25" screen, whilst higher spec models have the larger 10" screen Navi system that offers 3D connected navigation and voice control as well as gesture recognition. The optional Connectivity Box allows wireless phone charging. Two USB type C ports are fitted as standard in the front cabin, with higher trim models having an additional two ports in the rear cabin. eSIM which features eCall service as standard will contact the emergency services directly in case of a serious accident.

=== Optional equipment ===
Optional features (some of which are standard on higher models) include rear view camera, BeatsAudio 9-speaker sound system, Park Assist, leather sport seats, and LED exterior lighting with automatic headlight adjustment.

Optional equipment could be ordered individually or combined into packages were also available at extra cost.

The 'Winter Pack' includes Heated front seats, wash water and steering wheel.

The 'Convenience Pack' includes Rain and auto-dimming light sensor with Coming and Leaving Home, windshield wiper intermittent control and breakaway interior rearview mirror.

The 'Safe Pack' includes Forward collision warning with braking reaction to vehicles, cyclists and pedestrians. It includes multi-functional camera, speed limiter, lane keeping system and driver alert system.

=== Cupra León ===
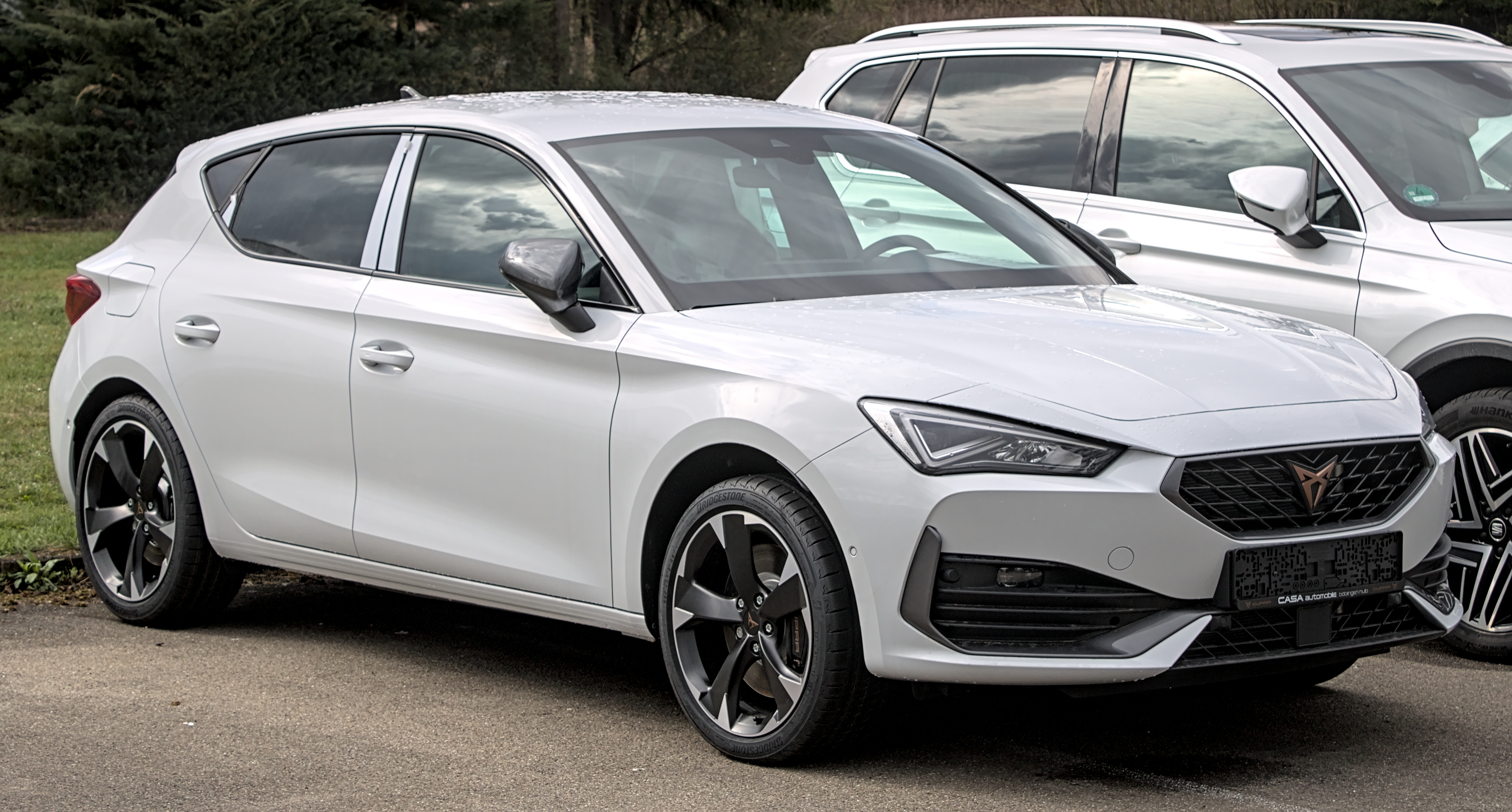
Cupra León hatchback

The León is also produced under SEAT's sister brand, Cupra and is available in 242 bhp or 296 bhp 2.0-litre turbocharged petrol engines. For a lower centre of gravity, the Cupra León sits 25 mm lower at the front and 20 mm lower at the rear compared to the regular Seat León.

Top of the range is the estate-only 306 bhp Cupra ST 4Drive, with four-wheel-drive system and a DSG gearbox. Performance figures for this Cupra ST 4Drive are rated at 4.8 sec to 62 mph, while top speed is limited to 155 mph.

The Cupra León (PHEV) e-Hybrid's powertrain comprises a 148 bhp turbocharged 1.4-litre four-cylinder petrol engine, a 113-horsepower electric motor, and a 13 kWh lithium battery pack. Combined, the system produces 242 bhp and 400 Nm of torque, allowing the car to reach 0–62 mph in 6.7 seconds. Seat claim it has a pure electric range of 32 miles and can achieve 217.3 mpg and a 30 g/km CO_{2} emissions figure.

Both 242 bhp versions are fitted with 18-inch alloy wheels as standard, while the higher-output models are fitted with 19-inch alloy wheels and 370 mm front discs with Brembo calipers.

The Cupra León 300TSI went on sale in early 2021 and features a turbocharged 2.0-litre four-cylinder petrol engine which produces 296 bhp and 400 Nm of torque; 0-62 mph time of 5.7 seconds and a top speed of 155 mph. Available in two versions: The entry-level VZ2 variant features 19-inch alloy wheels, black brake calipers, a quad exhaust system, and copper-coloured exterior detailing. VZ3 model gets a different set of 19-inch alloys, a wireless phone charger, heated leather seats, and a heated steering wheel.

=== Facelift ===
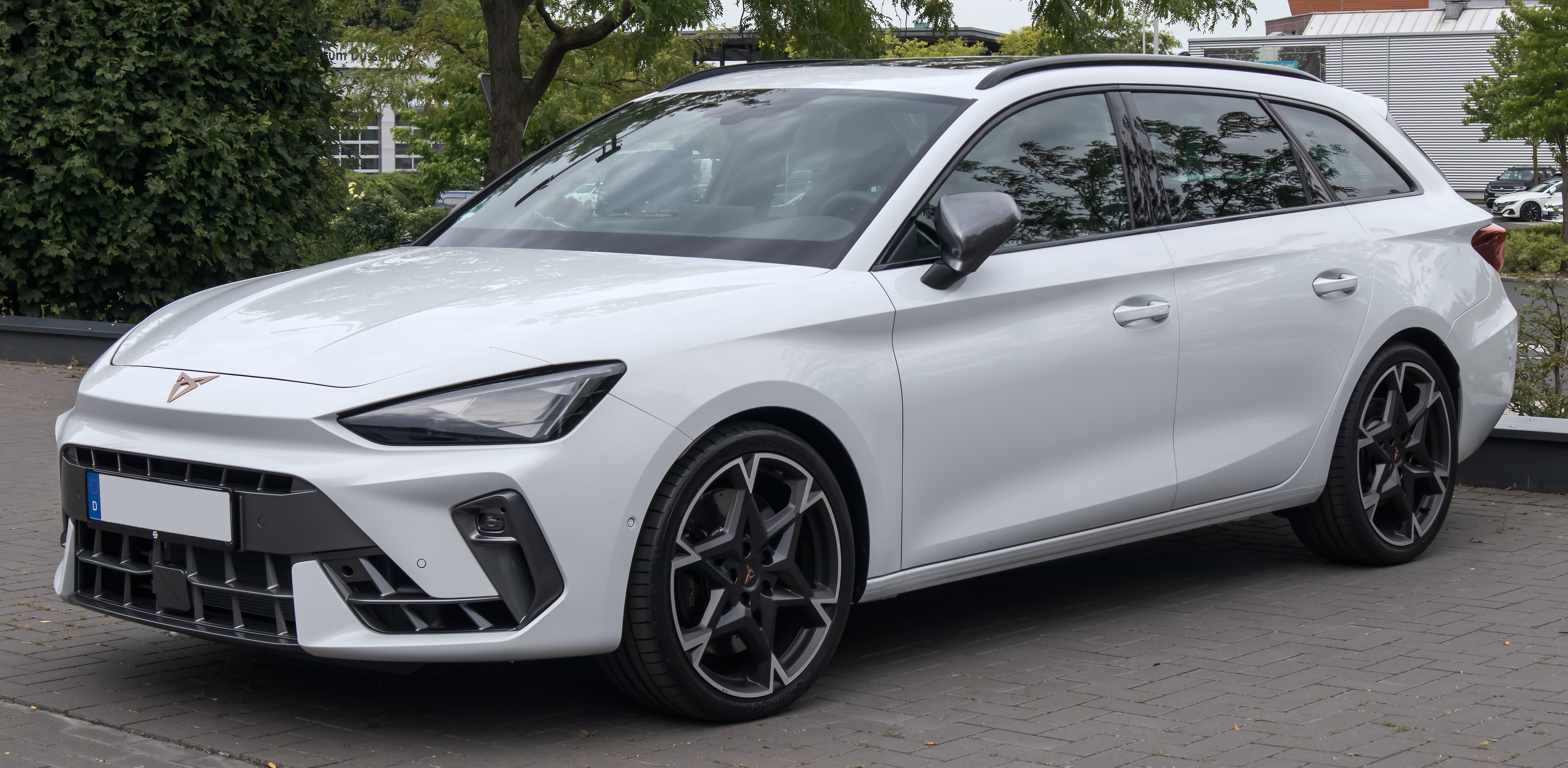
Cupra León Mk4 ST Facelift

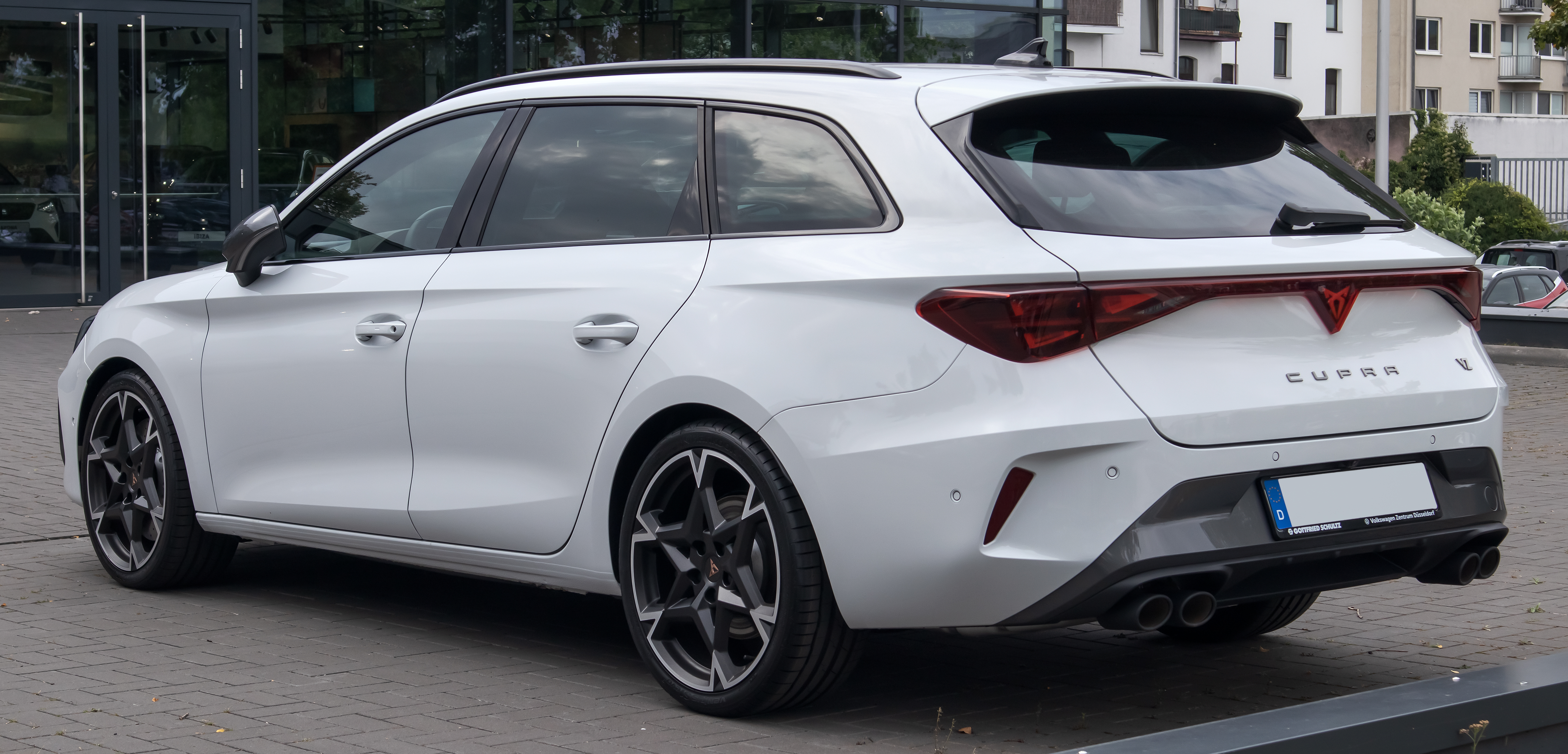
Cupra León Mk4 Sport Tourer Facelift rear

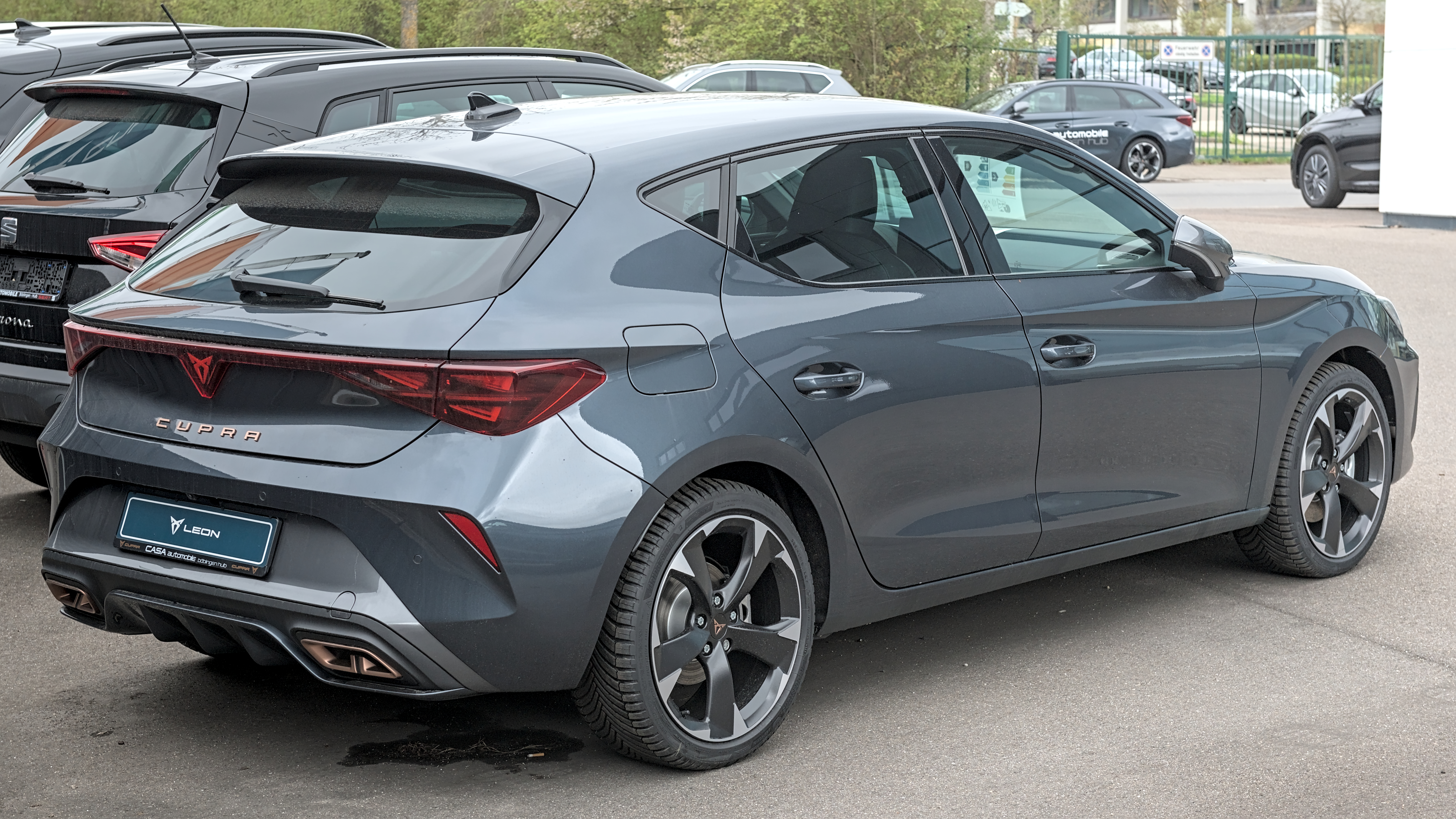
Rear view (hatchback)

A facelift for the Cupra León that adopts the new Tavascan design language was released in 2024.

=== Awards ===
The fourth generation León has won several awards including: Golden Steering Wheel Award for the SEAT León 1.5 eTSI model in the "Best price/product ratio up to 35,000 euros" category. In December 2020, The new SEAT León was voted "AUTOBEST 2021", the European accolade for the "Best Buy Car of Europe 2021". In January 2021, the Seat León 1.5 TSI 130 Evo FR was named Family Car of the Year by What Car? magazine. What Car? awarded the León five stars out of five in its review of the car.

== Motorsport ==
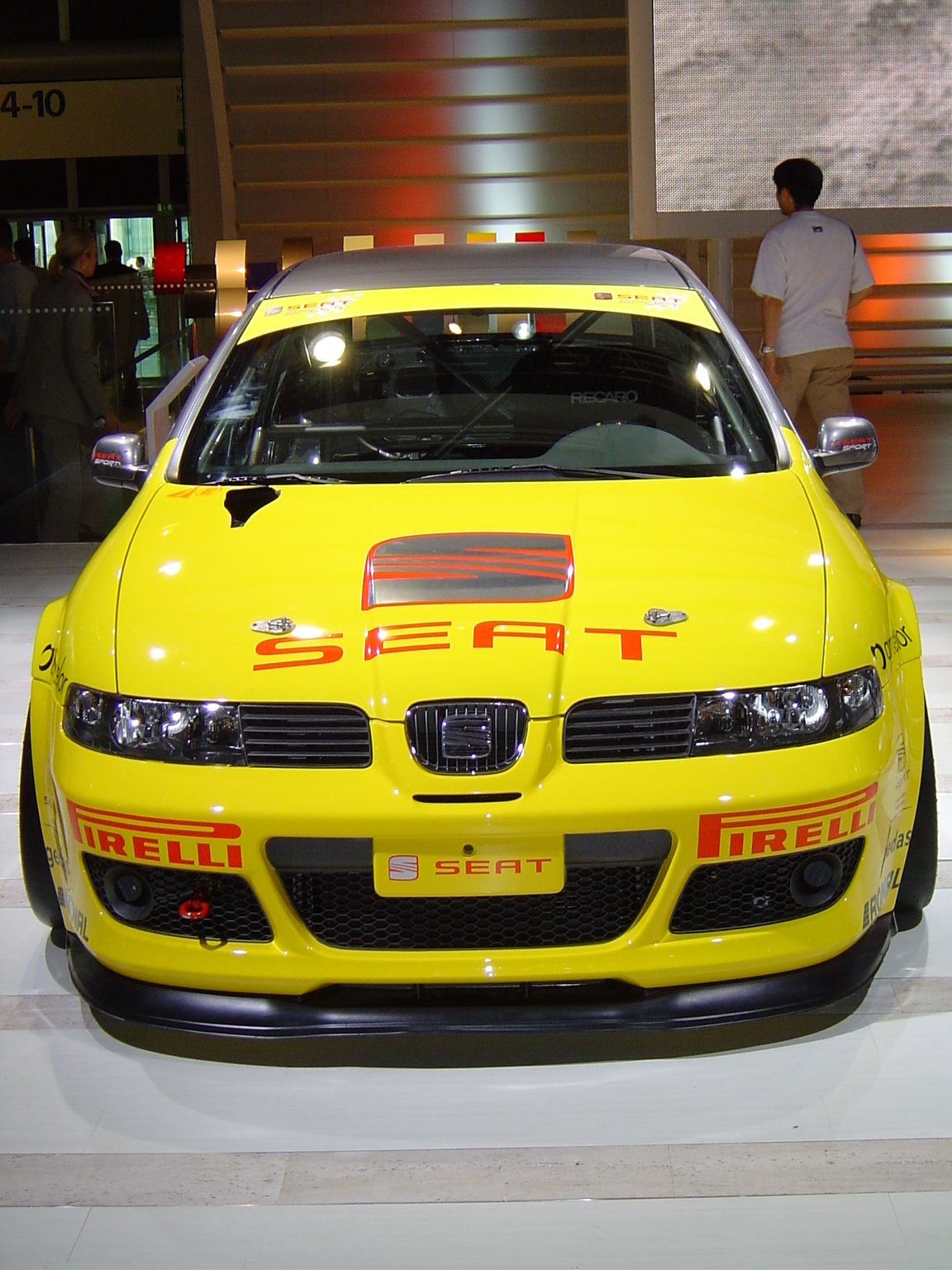
SEAT León Mk1 race car

The first generation SEAT León Cupra R was the basis of a one-make trophy, the SEAT León Supercopa. It operated in Spain, UK, Germany and Turkey from 2003. The car was developed by SEAT Sport and power was raised to 184 kilowatts (250 PS; 247 bhp). An "International Masters" final, featuring the best four drivers from each national series, was introduced in October 2005, as a support race for the Spanish GT Championship's final round at Montmeló. A TDI-powered version has raced in the ECTS, an Italian-based endurance series for touring cars.

In 2006, the Supercopa León was replaced by the new shape León. The car is potentially faster than the WTCC version, as it features a turbocharged 2.0-litre engine, with over 221 kW (300 PS; 296 bhp), increased torque, the DSG gearbox, better aerodynamics (it includes the WTCC car's front and rear spoilers, plus a venturi tunnel under the car, instead of a flat bottom), and 18 inch wheels, instead of the mandatory 17 inch wheels from the WTCC.

For 2007, the SEAT Cupra Championship in the UK (part of the TOCA Package) will run both 'New León' Cupra Race cars with 221 kW (300 PS; 296 bhp), as well as the Mk1 León Cupra R race car with 184 kW (250 PS; 247 bhp).

The SEAT León Eurocup began in 2008 as a support series for the World Touring Car Championship.

The car came top in Class D in the 2014 Liqui Moly Bathurst 12 Hour.

=== SEAT León Super 2000 car ===
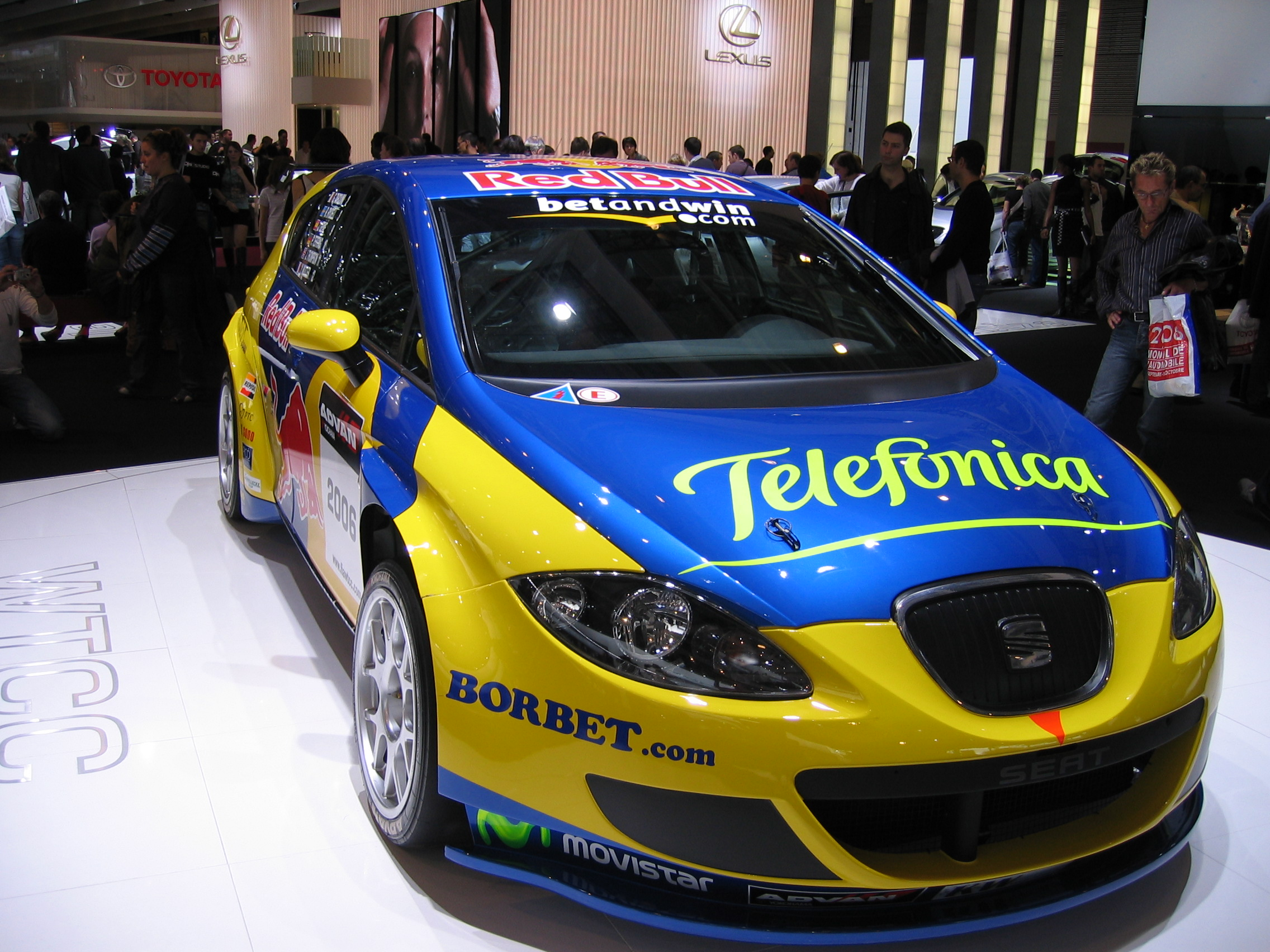
SEAT León Mk2 WTCC race car

During 2005, SEAT introduced the second generation León into the World Touring Car Championship (WTCC) to replace the Toledo Cupra which it had raced in the early rounds of the title. The car featured several modifications, including a racing engine that developed over 191 kW (260 PS; 256 bhp), a Hewland sequential-shift gearbox (unrelated to the DSG), and an aerodynamic package for increased downforce (with its hatchback shape, the León was disadvantaged against conventional three-box saloons). Minimum weight is 1,140 kg (2,513.3 lb) with driver. SEAT Sport, in partnership with Oreca, ran six cars in the WTCC. Two other cars were run by SEAT Sport UK (Northern South) based in Northampton, UK in the British Touring Car Championship (BTCC). A further two cars were run by SEAT Sport Italia in the Italia Superturismo Championship.

In mid-2007 SEAT introduced the León TDI to combat BMW's dominance by utilizing 2.0-litre Volkswagen EA189 TDI inline-4 turbodiesel engine. The car did show promise with Yvan Muller behind the wheel and the team was set to score championship win in Macau, but reliability issues caused Muller a retirement in Race 1 and the engine problems weren't solved in time thus not starting in Race 2 and handing the title to Andy Priaulx with BMW 320si.

In 2008, Muller won the FIA World Touring Car Championship for Drivers at the wheel of a León TDI, and SEAT won the Manufacturers' title. León TDI was also fielded by SEAT UK in the British Touring Car Championship with Jason Plato being the lead driver. Plato finished second behind Fabrizio Giovanardi with Vauxhall in the drivers' championship. At the end of the season SEAT UK withdrew from the series and subsequently this was the only season where León TDI competed in the BTCC.

In 2009, Gabriele Tarquini became the Drivers' Champion with the León TDI, and SEAT won the Manufacturers' title for a second consecutive year. At the end of the season SEAT Sport officially ended their manufacturer support. León TDI cars were entered by Sunred Engineering for the following season and despite not having official manufacturer support from SEAT, in the manufacturers' championship the entity was named SEAT Customers Technology. Tarquini finished second in the drivers' standings behind Yvan Muller with Chevrolet.

For 2011, new rules were introduced in WTCC, incorporating a new engine formula - 1.6 turbocharged engines, similar to those used in the World Rally Championship. In line with the changes Sunred created the SUNRED SR León 1.6T, using the then León TDI as base. The cars, however, were not ready for the start of the season, and Sunred drivers used the older León TDI, which was still eligible to enter thanks to the Jay Ten Trophy, introduced by the series promoter Eurosport for 2010-spec cars.

In 2012, SEAT Sport unofficially returned to the series introducing the SEAT León WTCC, effectively replacing the SR León from Sunred, to privateer entries. Some drivers like Tom Boardman and Tiago Monteiro started the season using the old León TDI. The TDI version was still eligible in the European Touring Car Cup where Fernando Monje won the 2012 championship. For the following season León TDI was banned from ETC Cup and with everyone upgraded to the León WTCC 2012 marked the last time diesel car was entered in WTCC and ETCC. The Léon WTCC continued to be eligible until the introduction of TC1 in 2014 (although León WTCC was able to be entered in the TC2 class in the same year as TC1's introduction).

=== León Cup Racer and León TCR ===
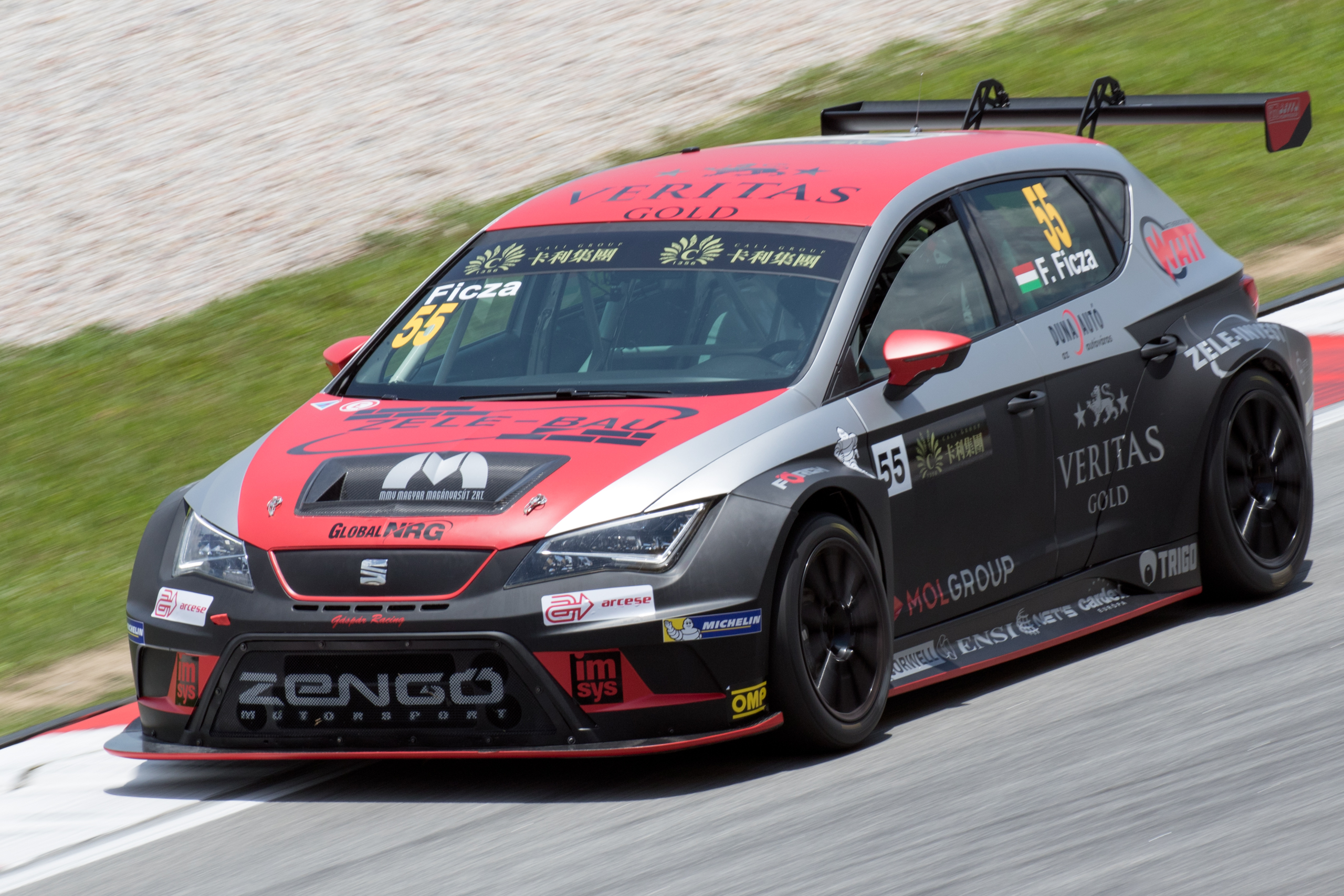
SEAT León Cup Racer race car

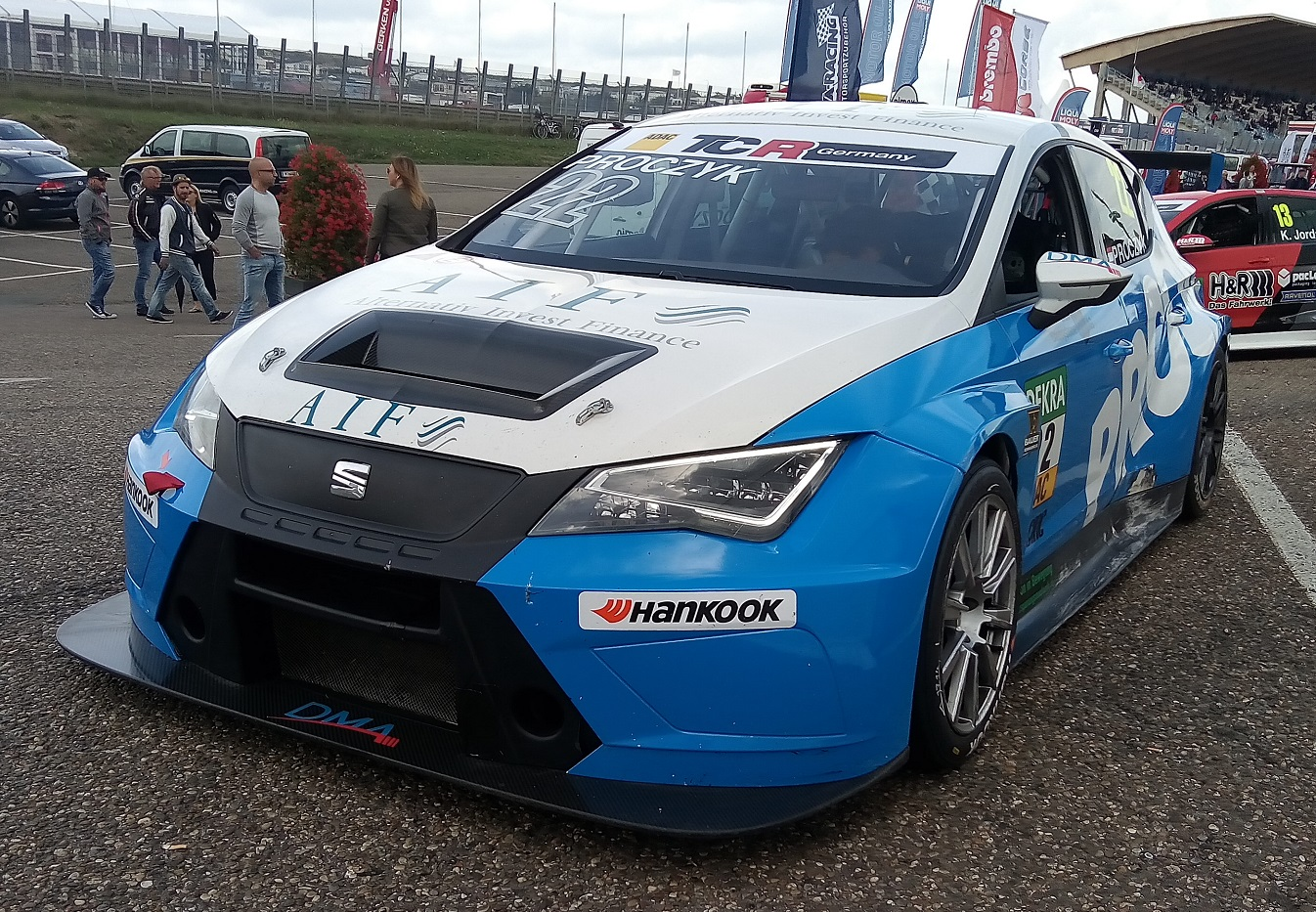
Seat León TCR race car

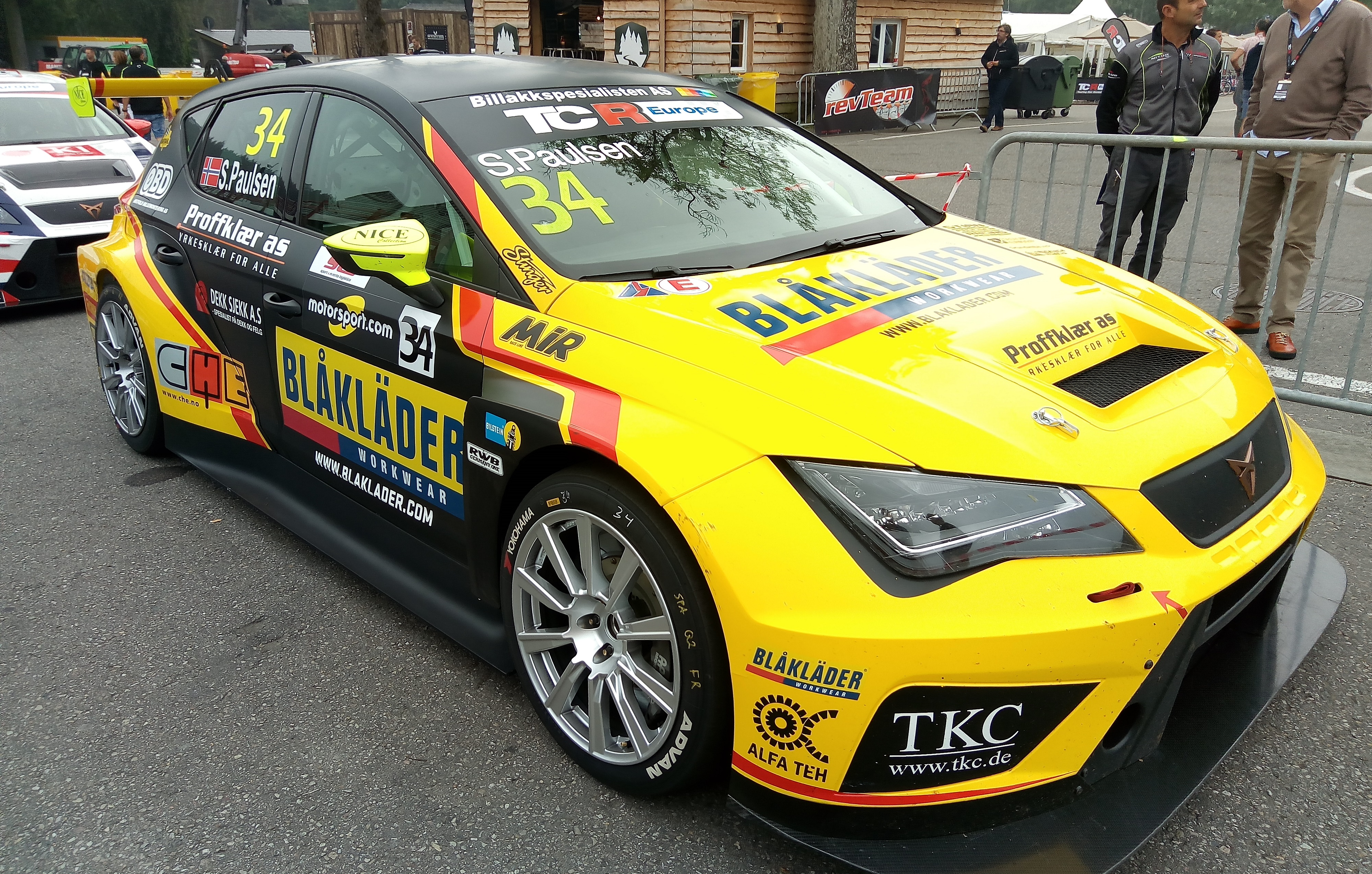
Cupra León TCR race car

In 2013, SEAT Sport introduced a concept car, based on the third generation of León. Initially it was thought that this would be the car in which SEAT Sport would return to the series with full manufacturer team under the new TC1 regulations. However SEAT Sport announced that the car would be part of the revived León Eurocup for 2014.

The León Cup Racer then formed the base for the newly formed TCR International Series. The TCR regulations use this car as a template for the aerodynamic portions of the cars. In 2016 SEAT Sport introduced a TCR-spec version of the León with the original Cup Racer still being eligible in the International Series as well as national and regional championship utilising the TCR regulations.

=== León Competición and León VZ TCR ===
In 2020, CUPRA Racing launched the new CUPRA León Competición TCR, based on the fourth generation of León. It had improvements in many areas including the new 2.0l TFSI engine, sequential gearbox and an impressive aerodynamic package. The car was used for the first time in TCR Italy at the Mugello circuit getting the first win on Race 1 with Salvatore Tavano at the wheel. After that, the car was used in other TCR championships including TCR Spain, TCR Denmark, STCC and specially in WTCR by Mikel Azcona with Zengo Motorsport, getting many wins and the title of TCR Italy that year.

In the following years, 2021, 2022 and 2023, the car won different championships as STCC TCR Scandinavia Touring Car Championship, TCR Japan Touring Car Series, TCR Spain Touring Car Championship and specially TCR Europe, where Mikel Azcona was crowned for second time as European TCR Champion.

In 2024, CUPRA Racing developed an evolution of the car and made a new homologation for the CUPRA León VZ TCR. The car was based on the CUPRA León MK4 restyling and has been used in many championships worldwide, getting wins in all of them and titles in TCR Europe for two years in a row in 2024 and 2025 with Franco Girolami and Jenson Brickley respectively with Monlau Motorsport Team. In addition, the car was used in 2025 at the TCR World Tour by SP Competition, taking three wins during the championship with Aurélien Comte, and won other Championships as TCR Mexico with Juan Pablo Sierra, TCR UK with Adam Shepherd and TC France with Giovanni Scamardi. Also, this year marked the entry of the first CUPRA in USA at the Michelin Pilot Challenge (IMSA) with Victor Gonzalez Racing Team, taking the first win at the iconic track of Indianapolis Motor Speedway.

The car has been named the 2025 TCR Car of the Year. This award, presented by the WSC, is based on a ranking that considers the results of all TCR-certified cars in every official race held during the season.

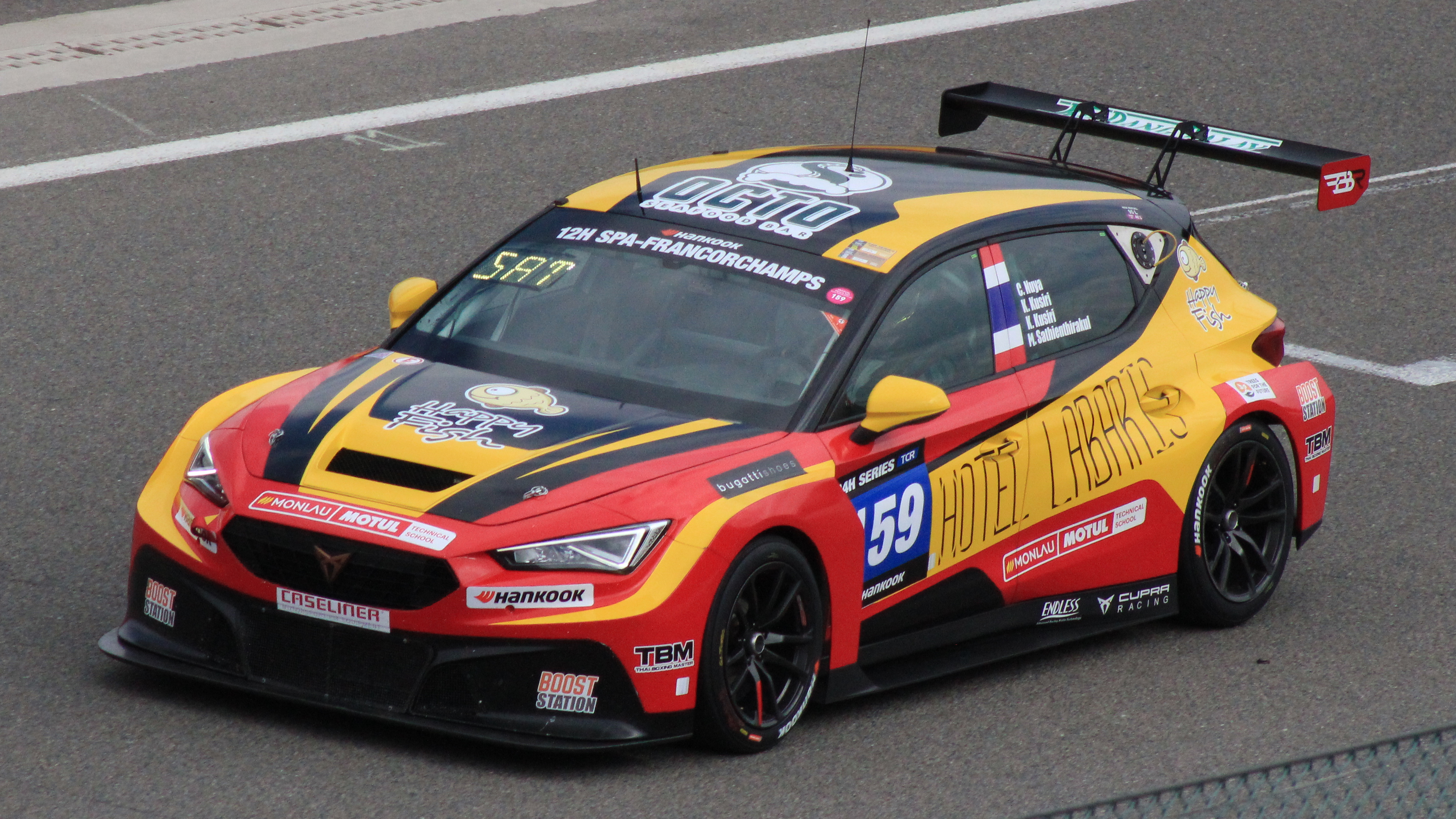
Cupra León Competición TCR race car

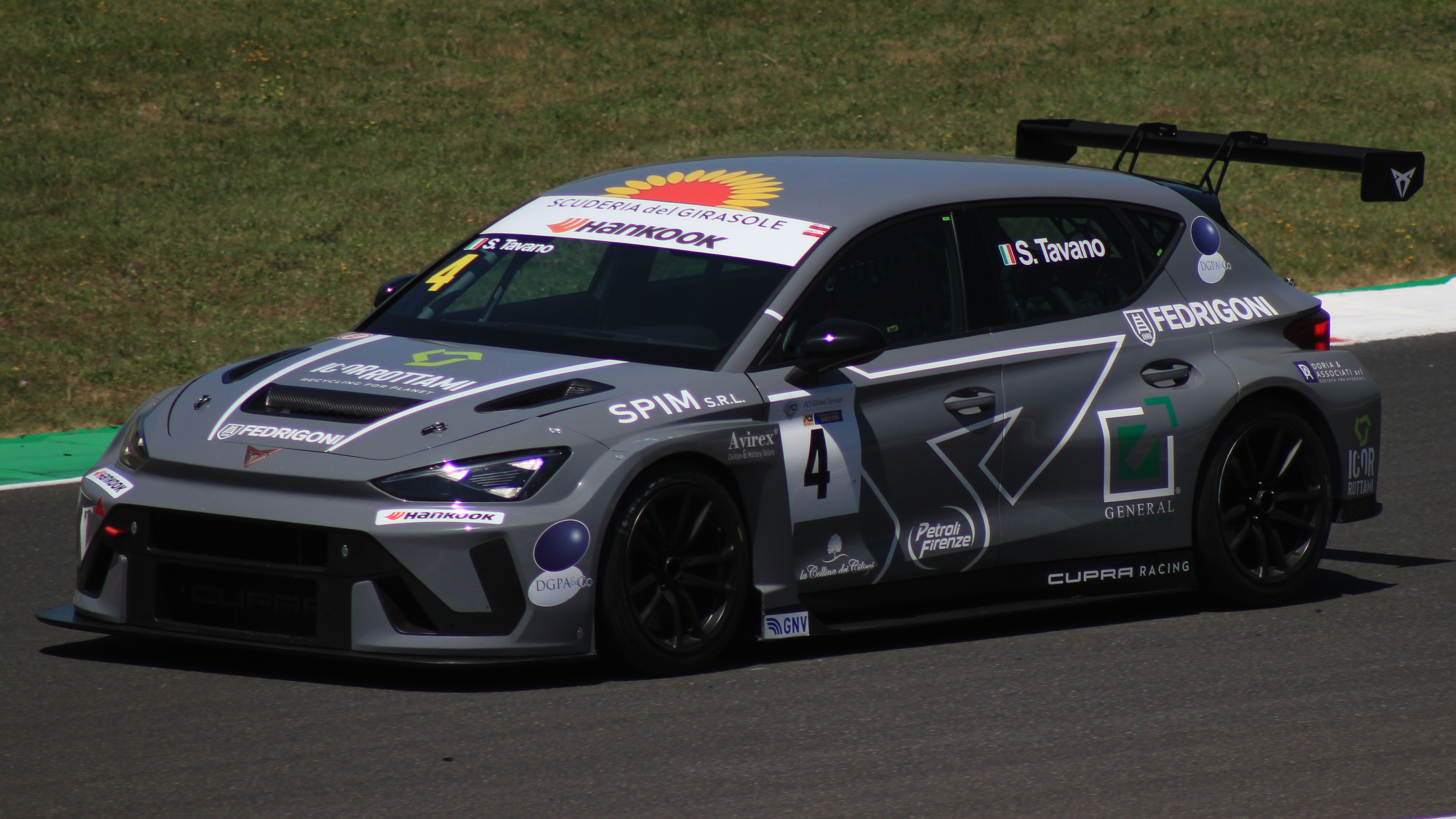
Cupra León VZ TCR race car

=== León (NGTC) ===
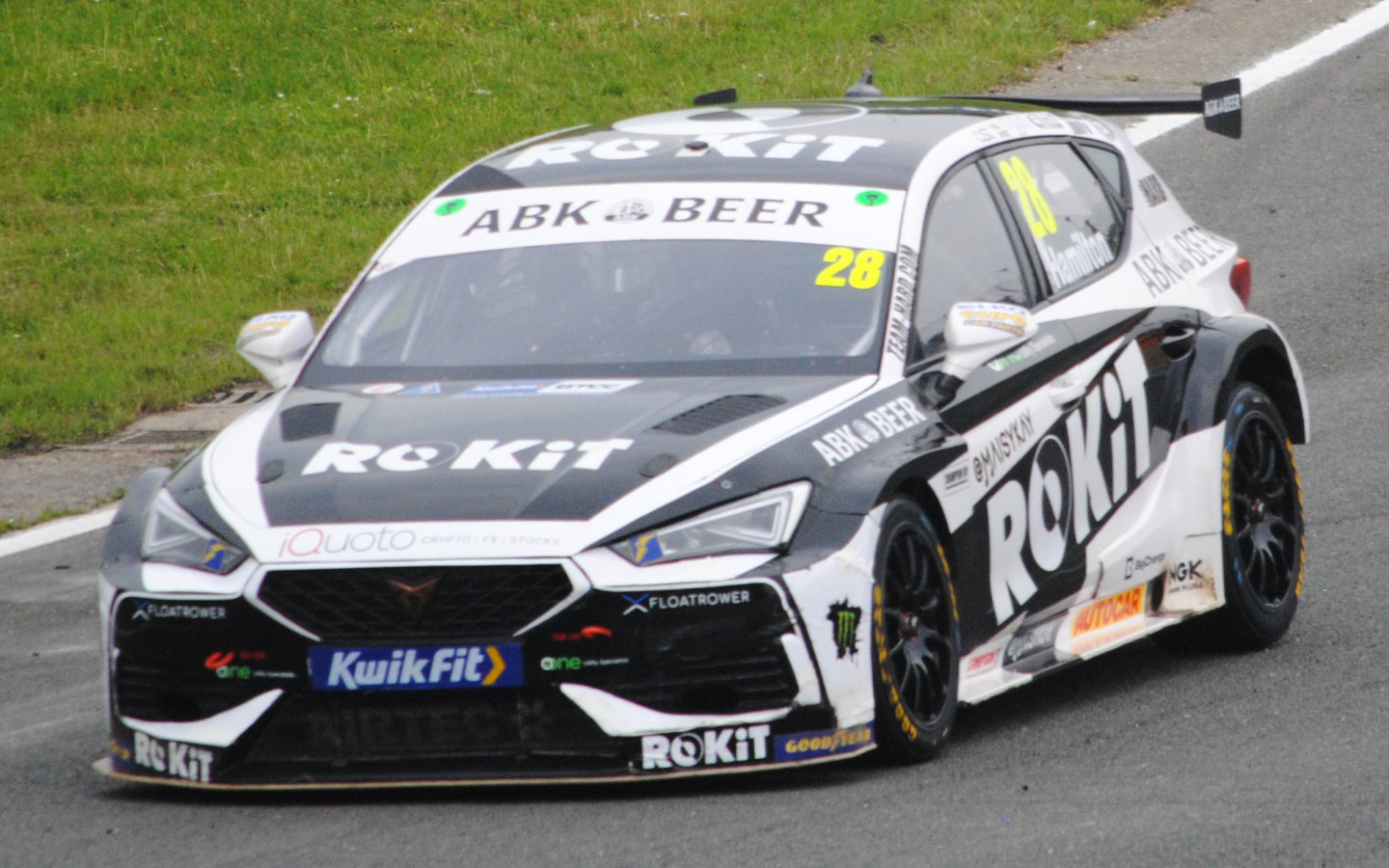
Nicolas Hamilton driving the León at Brands Hatch.

Team HARD Racing built and ran four new Cupra León cars for the 2021 season. The drivers were announced to be Glynn Geddie, Jack Goff, Nicolas Hamilton and Árón Taylor-Smith. As of Brands Hatch race 3, the car has scored points in every race as well as a podium, courtesy of Goff.

=== León e-Racer (ETCR) ===
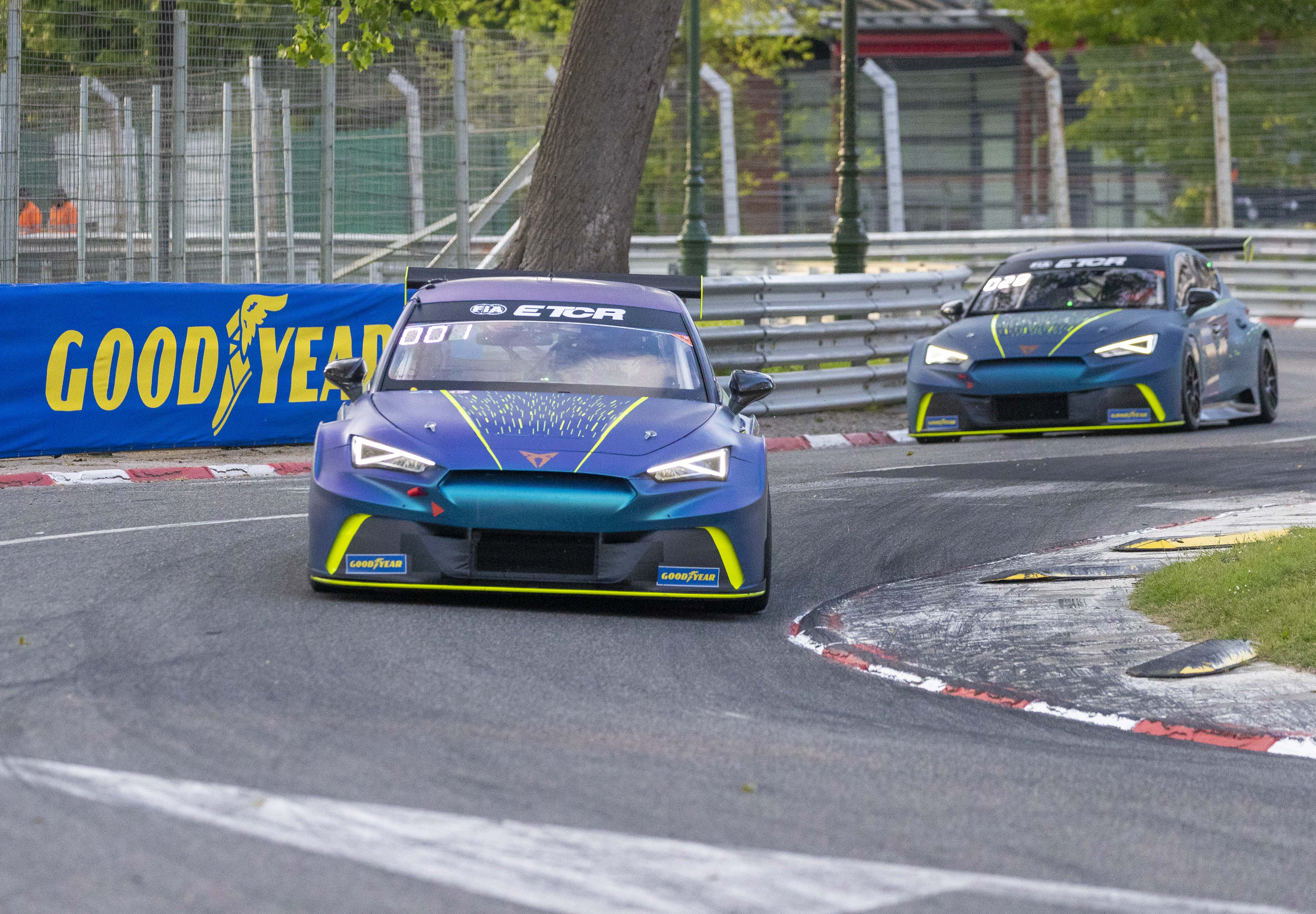
Mattias Ekström (Cupra ETCR #001) leads Jordi Gené (#028) at Pau during the first round of the 2022 FIA ETCR season

The Cupra e-Racer is an electric car touring car. It competed in the e-TCR electric touring car racing series, against competitors from Hyundai and Alfa Romeo, securing the manufacturer's championship following the inaugural season in 2021 and the second season in 2022.

=== Summary ===
Year	Championship	Result
2006	British Touring Car Championship	1 (Manufacturers)
2006	Italian Superturismo Championship	1 (Drivers)
2007	British Touring Car Championship	1 (Teams)
2007	Danish Touringcar Championship	1
2008	World Touring Car Championship	1
2009	World Touring Car Championship	1
2012	Russian Touring Car Championship	3
2015	TCR International Series	1
2016	Russian Touring Car Championship	1
2018	TCR Europe Touring Car Series	1
2019	TCR Italy Touring Car Championship	1
2020	TCR Italy Touring Car Championship	1
2021	FIA ETCR – eTouring Car World Cup	2 (Drivers & Teams)
2021	TCR Europe Touring Car Series	1
2022	FIA ETCR – eTouring Car World Cup	2 (Drivers & Teams)
2023	Russian Touring Car Championship	1
2023	TCR UK Touring Car Championship	1
2024	TCR Europe Touring Car Series	1
2024	TCR UK Touring Car Championship	1
2025	TCR Europe Touring Car Series	2 (Drivers & Teams)
2025	Russian Touring Car Championship	2 (Drivers & Teams (Note: Points were also scored with an entrant from another manufacturer.))
2025	TCR UK Touring Car Championship	2 (Drivers & Teams)

== Sales and production figures ==
Since its launch in 1999, more than 2 million SEAT León cars have been produced and sold in its three generations up to the present, made in SEAT's Martorell plant and at other Volkswagen Group factories.

In the year 2011, the total annual retail sales number of SEAT León cars was 77,075 vehicles, while the annual production of vehicles came up to 80,736 units.

The total production per year of SEAT/Cupra León cars, manufactured in SEAT and other Volkswagen Group plants, is shown below :

Model	1999	2000	2001	2002	2003	2004	2005	2006	2007	2008	2009	2010	2011	2012	2013	2014	2015	2016	2017	2018	2019	2020	2021	2022	2023	2024	2025
SEAT/Cupra León Total annual production	6,080	93,123	91,939	93,606	96,536	90,850	98,130	126,511	120,630	96,761	66,368	79,462	80,736	71,295	114,568	157,087	169,455	163,228	163,306	159,486	153,837	124,323	83,813	56,317	102,965	105,864	125,211
