= Škoda Octavia =

Czech small family car

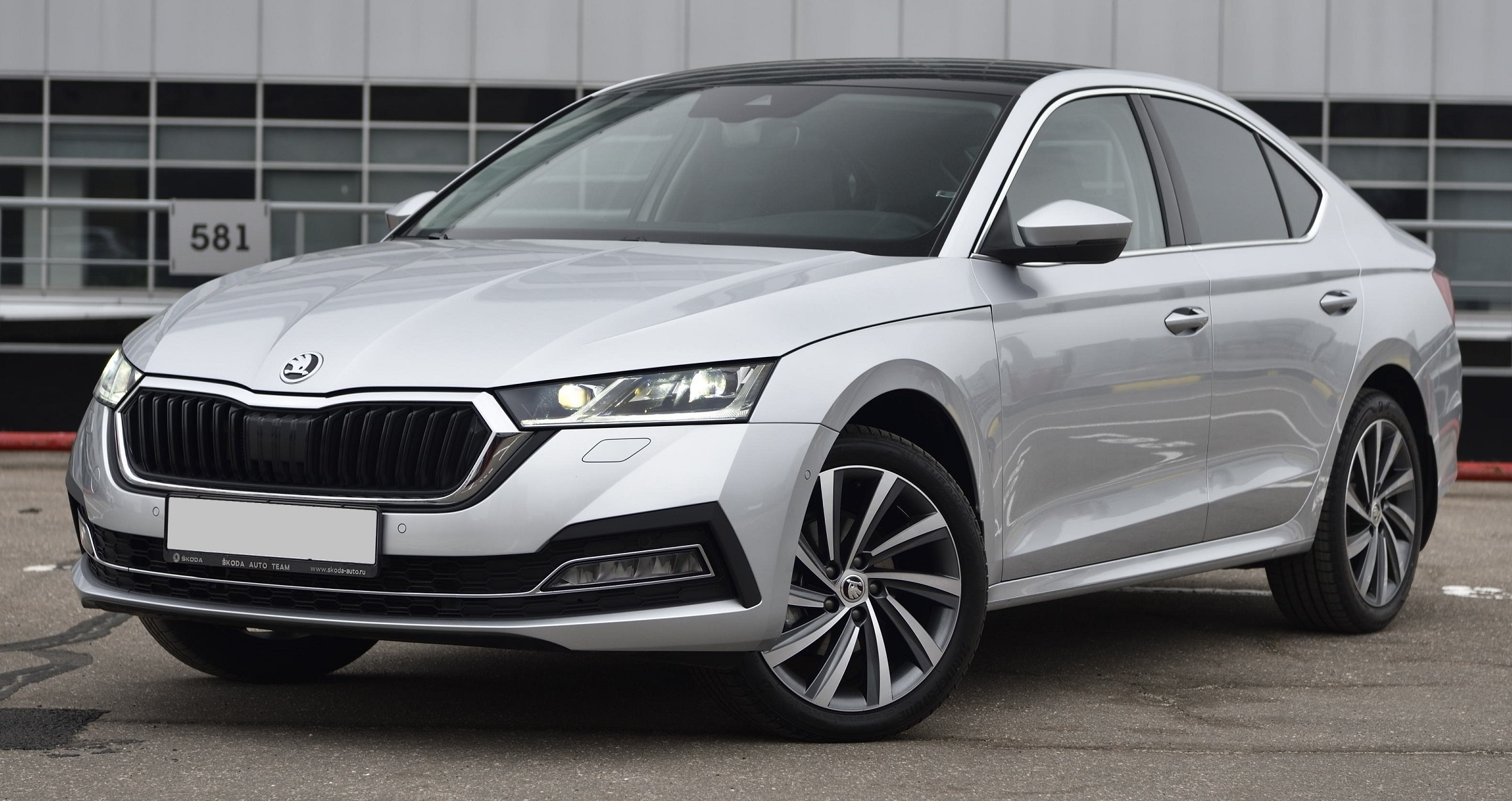
- Škoda Octavia IV liftback

Overview
- Manufacturer: Škoda Auto
- Production: 1996–present

Body and chassis
- Class: Small family car (C)
- Body style: 5-door liftback 5-door estate

The Škoda Octavia is a small family car (C-segment) produced by the Czech car manufacturer Škoda Auto since the end of 1996. It shares its name with an earlier model produced between 1959 and 1971. Four generations of the modern-era Octavia model have been introduced to date, delivered with five-door liftback or five-door estate styles only. The car is front engined and both front- or four-wheel drive are offered. The Octavia is Škoda’s best-selling model, with almost 7.9 million units produced by August 2026.

The fourth generation was unveiled in November 2019 and received a facelift in February 2024. The estate version is sold as the Octavia Combi, and the range includes high-performance RS models, first introduced in 2000.

== First generation (Typ 1U; 1996) ==
Škoda Octavia Mk1
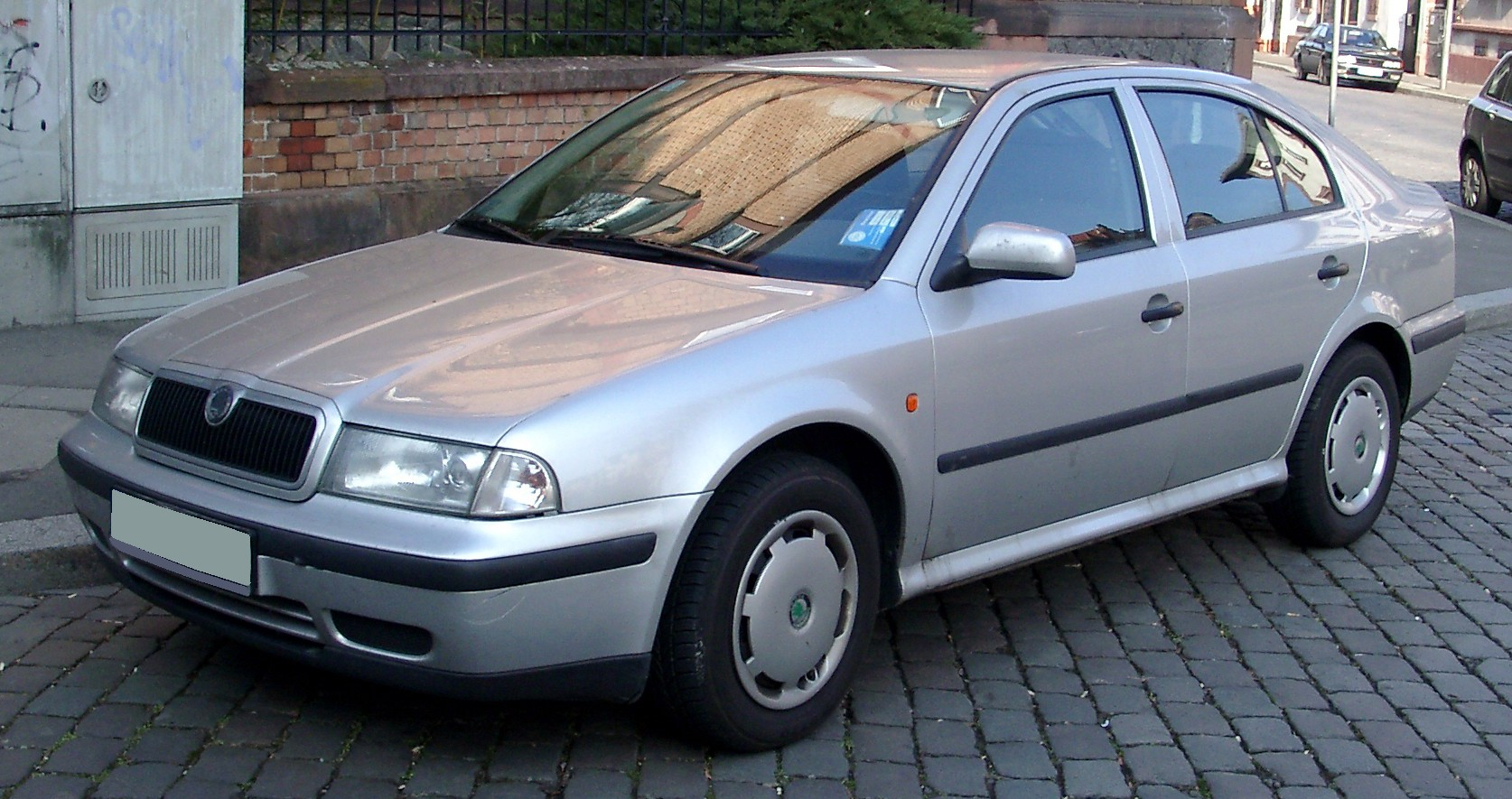

Overview
- Model code: 1U
- Also called: Škoda Octavia Tour (Note: In markets where the Mk2 models was introduced in 2004.); Škoda Octavia Tradition; Škoda Octavia Drive
- Production: 1996–2010 (Czech Republic); 2001–2011 (Ukraine); 2002–2010 (India); 2005–2010 (Kazakhstan)
- Assembly: Mladá Boleslav, Czech Republic; Poznań, Poland; Sarajevo, Bosnia and Herzegovina; Aurangabad, India (Škoda India); Solomonovo, Ukraine; Ust-Kamenogorsk, Kazakhstan
- Designer: Luc Donckerwolke

Body and chassis
- Body style: 5-door liftback 5-door estate
- Platform: Volkswagen Group A4 (PQ34)
- Related: Audi A3 Mk1; Audi S3 Mk1; SEAT León Mk1; SEAT Toledo Mk2; Volkswagen Golf Mk4; Volkswagen Jetta Mk4

Powertrain
- Engine: Petrol: 1.4 L 8v I4; 1.4 L 16v I4; 1.6 L 8v I4; 1.8 L 20v I4; 1.8 L 20v I4 turbo 2.0 L 8v I4; Diesel: 1.9 L 8v I4 SDI; 1.9 L 8v I4 TDI
- Transmission: 5/6-speed manual 4/5-speed automatic

Dimensions
- Wheelbase: 2,512 mm (98.9 in)
- Length: 4,511 mm (177.6 in) (1996–00); 4,507 mm (177.4 in) (2000–10, liftback); 4,513 mm (177.7 in) (2000–10, estate)
- Width: 1,731 mm (68.1 in)
- Height: 1,429 mm (56.3 in) (1996–00, liftback); 1,448 mm (57.0 in) (1996–00, estate); 1,431 mm (56.3 in) (2000–10, liftback); 1,457 mm (57.4 in) (2000–10, estate)

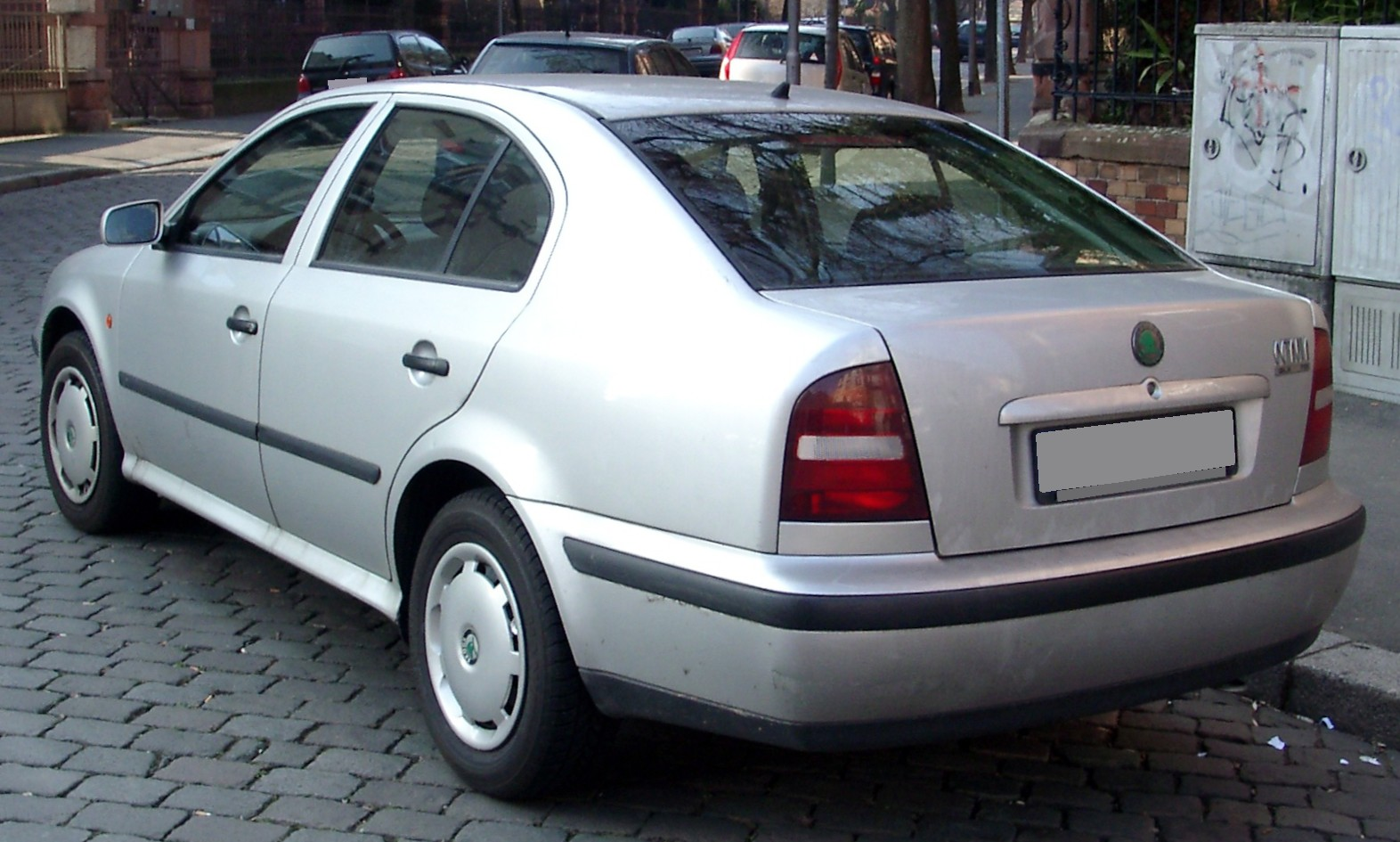
Škoda Octavia (pre-facelift)

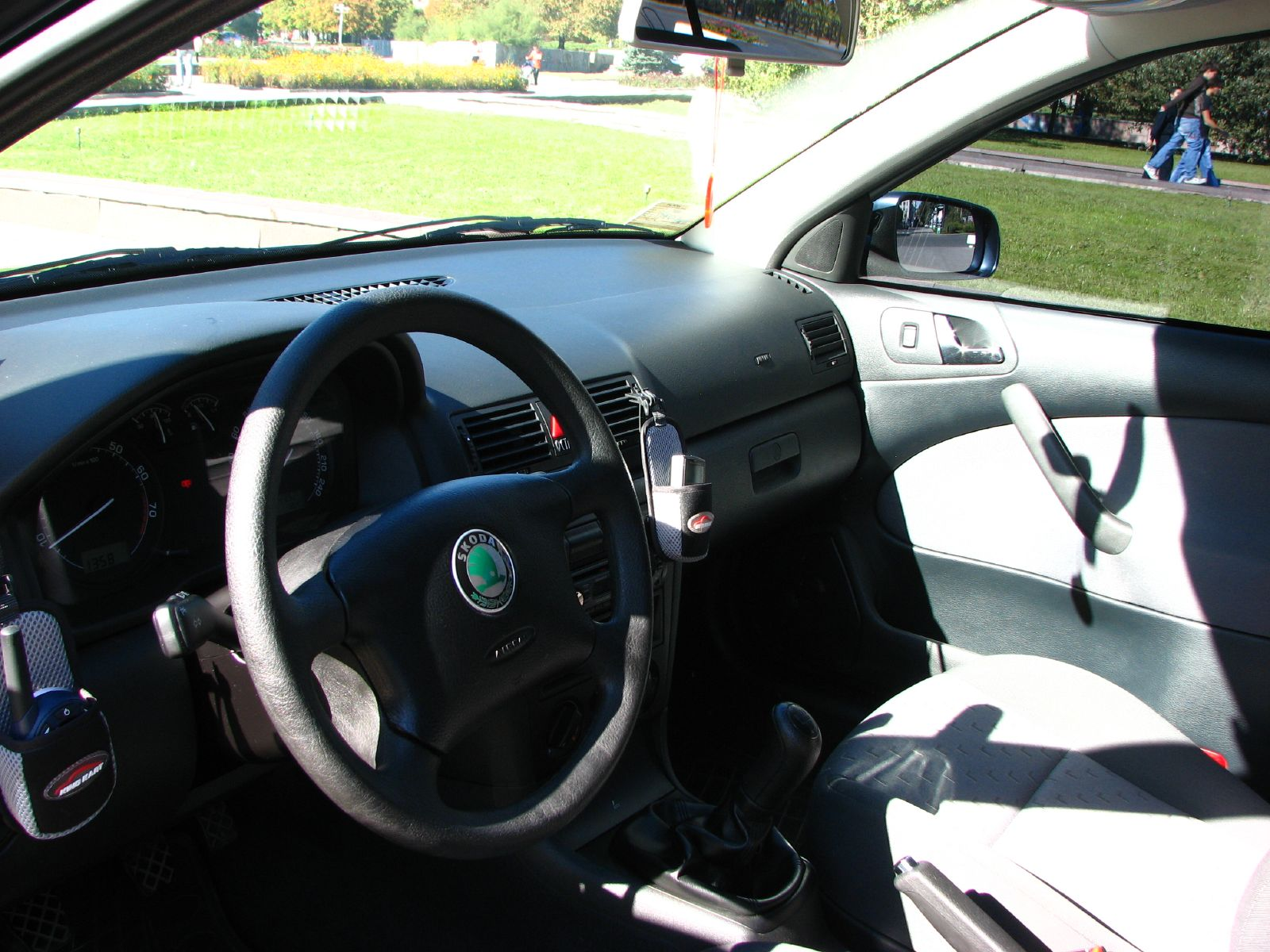
Interior (facelift)

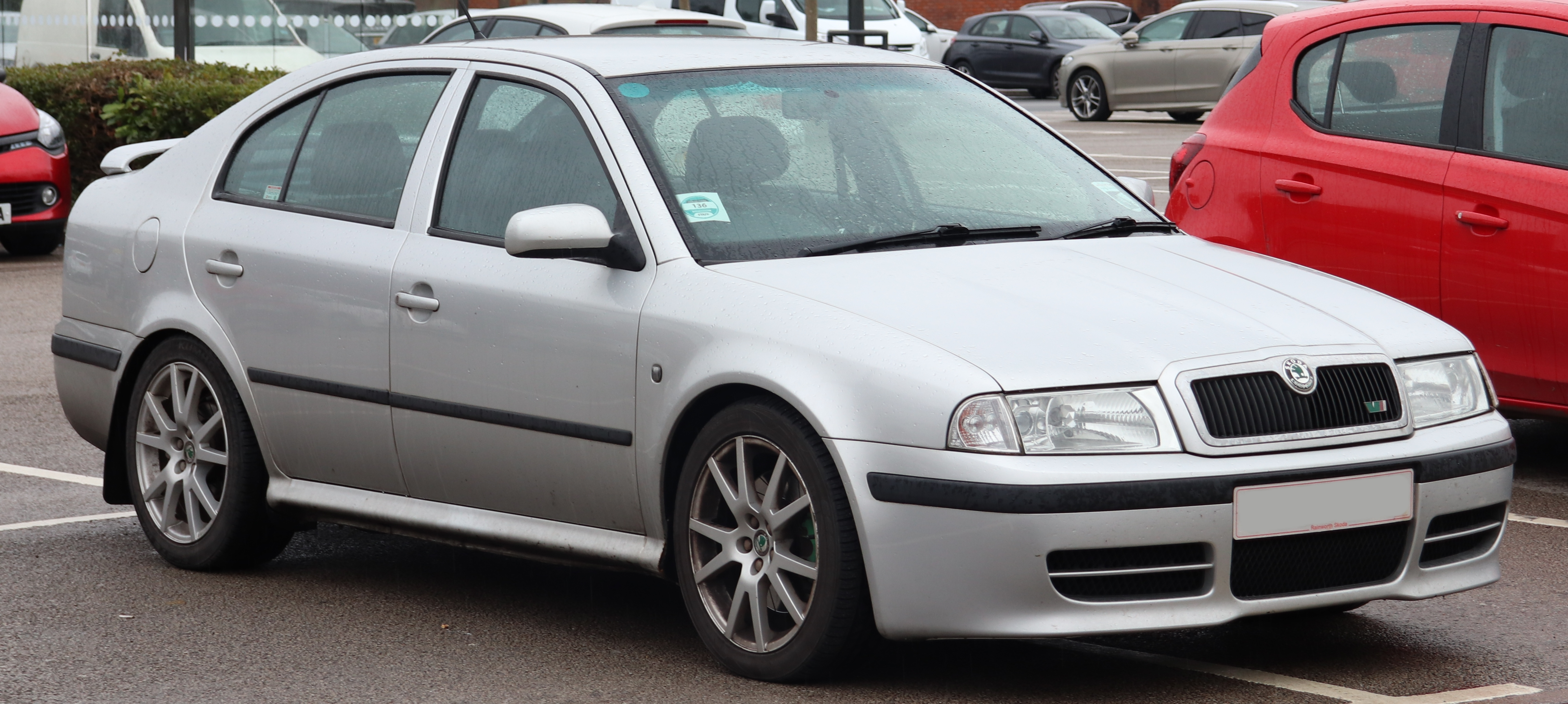

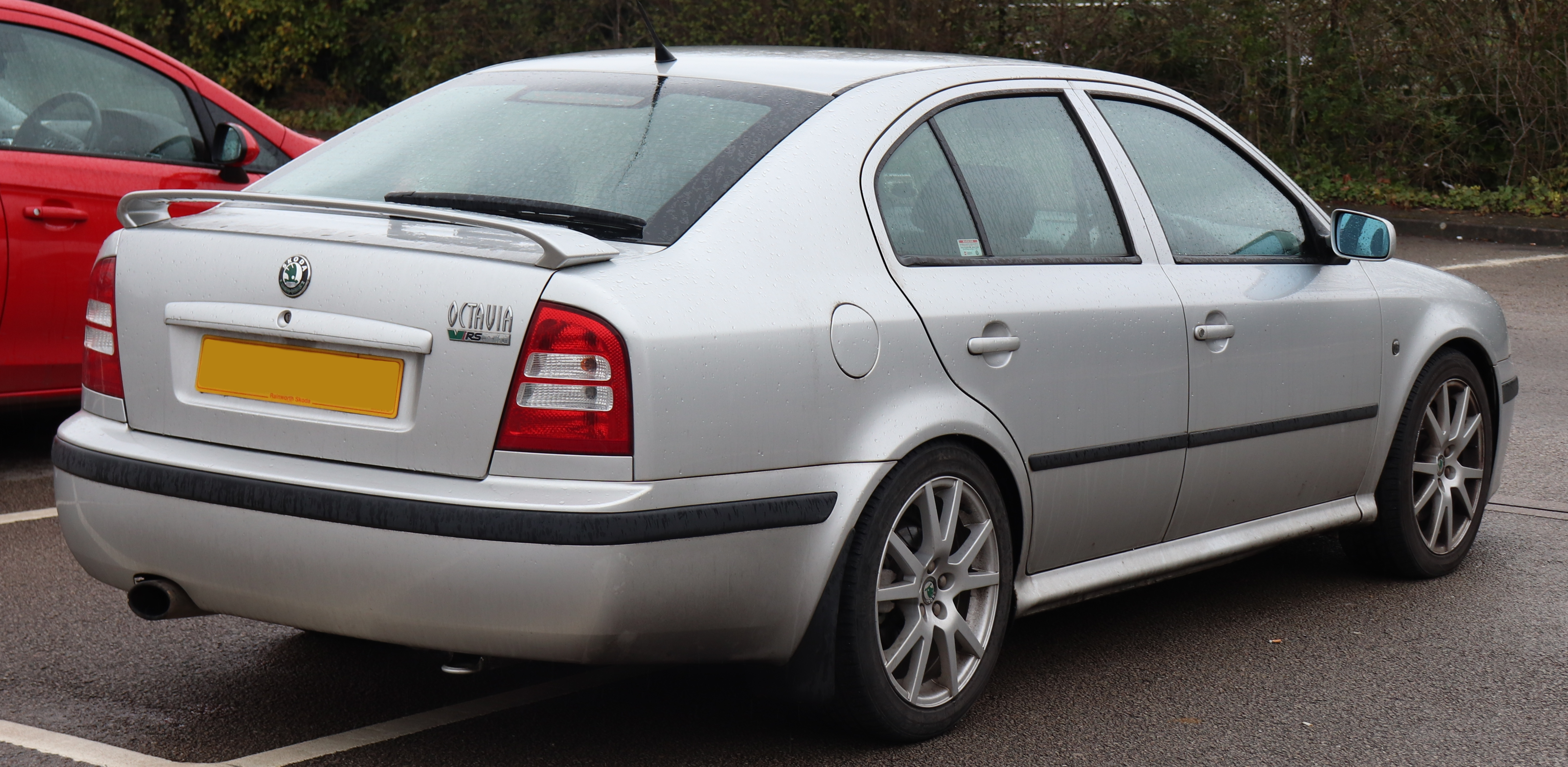
Škoda Octavia vRS

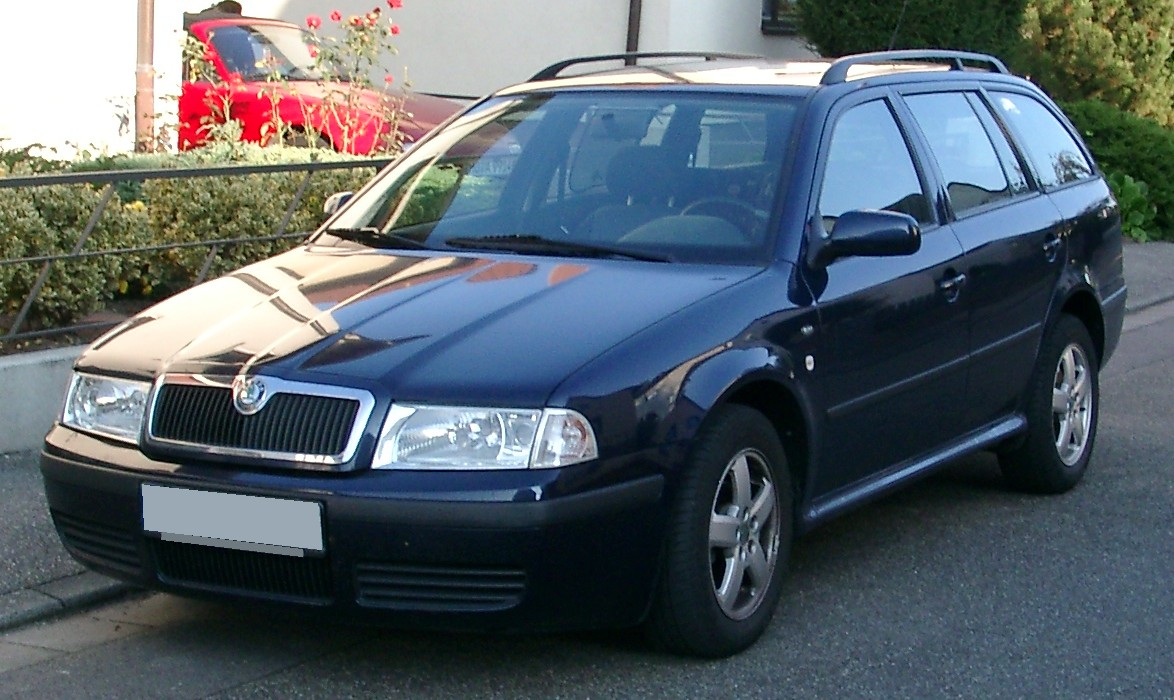

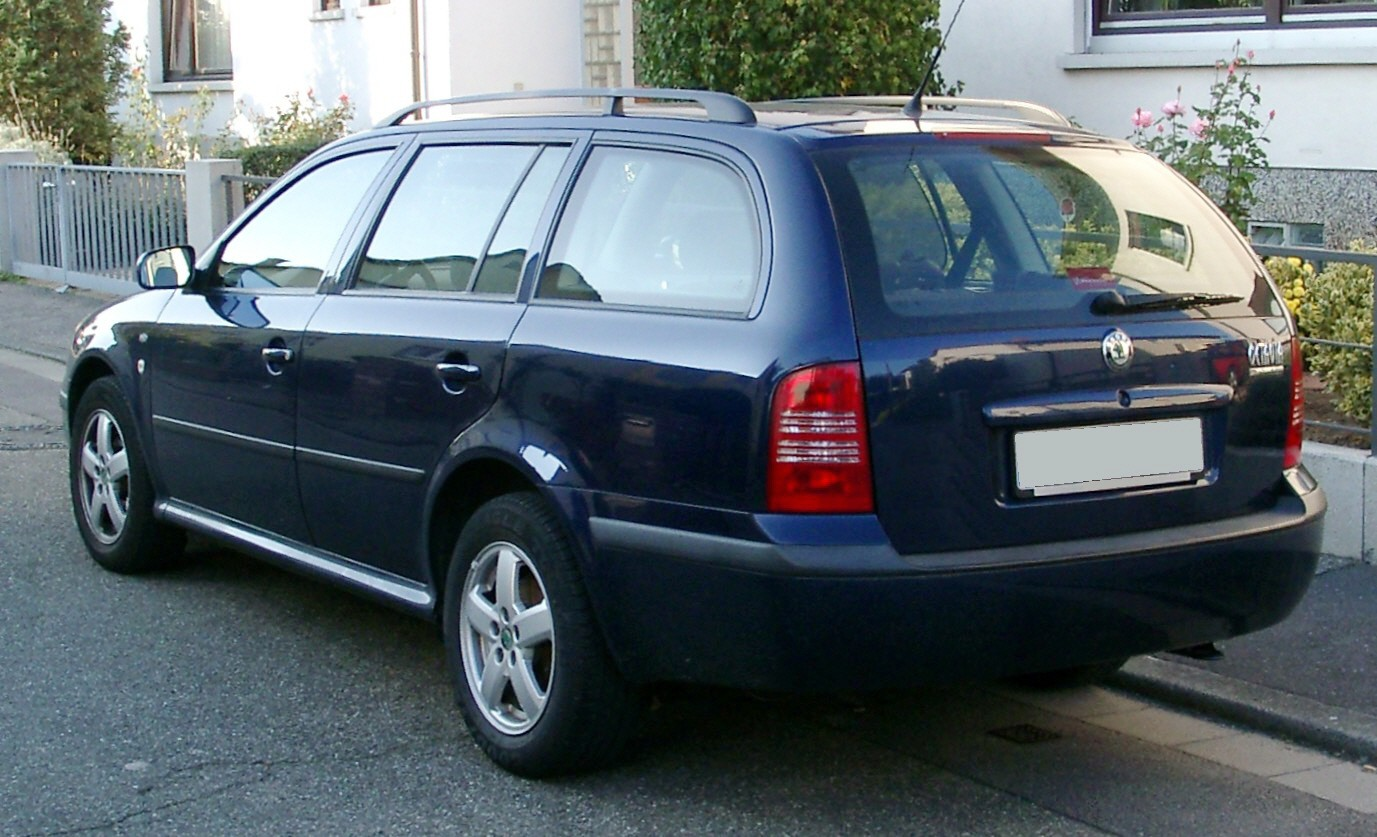
Combi (facelift)

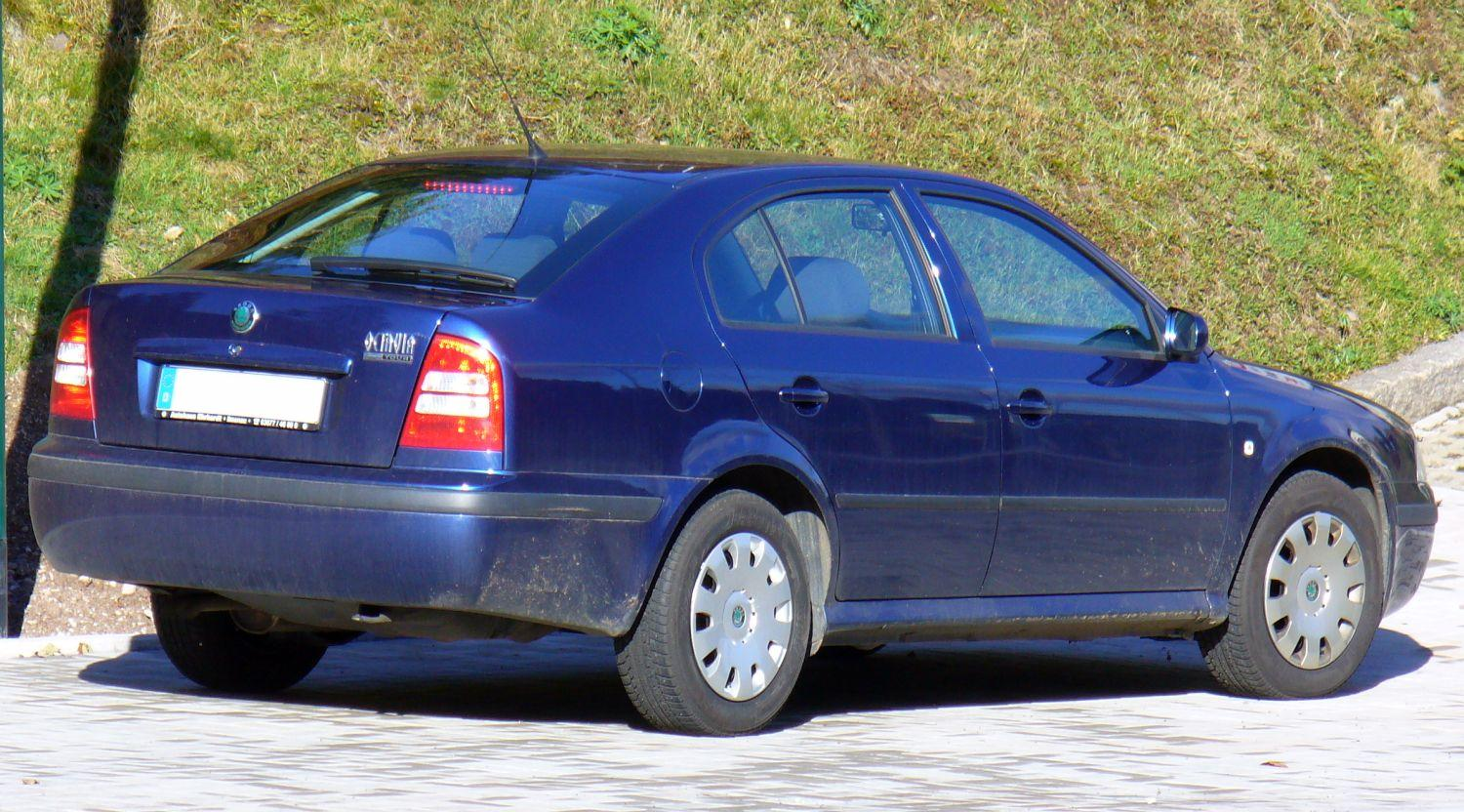
Liftback (facelift)

The first generation Octavia was released in November 1996 for the 1997 model year and was built at the modernised Škoda factory in Mladá Boleslav, Czech Republic. This generation was made available in liftback or estate styles. At the time of introduction, it was available with three engines: petrol units included an eight-valve 1.6 and the 20-valve 1.8, while the diesel option was the well known 1.9 TDI in 90 PS (66 kW) form. This was soon joined by the more powerful TDI 110 and later on by various derivatives. In April 1999, Škoda chose to expand the range downwards, with the very basic 1.4 LX model. This was sold mainly in the Czech domestic market and may be identified from the exterior by the missing door trim. It used the 60 PS (44 kW) pushrod unit from the Felicia, derived from the engine first introduced on the 1964 Škoda 1000 MB. This proved underpowered and a slow seller and was replaced by Volkswagen's own, 75 PS (55 kW) 1.4-litre unit at the time of the 2000 facelift, although sales continued until April 2001.

In the United Kingdom, sales began in 1998 and the mid-size car was a success, nearing the success of established large family car favourites such as the Ford Mondeo and Vauxhall Vectra.

The first generation Octavia had a facelift in 2000 for the 2001 model year, and was still manufactured and marketed in some markets, even after the second generation was introduced in 2004. In Germany, and other parts of West Europe, as well as Asia, the first generation model was marketed as the Octavia Tour, while the newer model is marketed as the Octavia. In some markets, the first generation Octavia was still known as Octavia, and the newer model was referred to as the new Octavia, Octavia5 (Greece) or Laura (India).

In India, the Octavia was launched in 2002 and was an instant hit for its frugal engines and solid build. It became a huge success in India, selling 44,900 units.

Revisions to the facelifted model included independent rear suspension and revised interior.

The facelifted Octavia featured a 4x4 wheel drive version both for the estate and more popular liftback models, and used the Haldex Traction clutch, like other Volkswagen Group A platform based cars (Volkswagen Golf Mk4, Audi A3 and SEAT León Cupra R4). It had higher ground clearance and a bigger fuel tank carrying 63-litre (17 US gal; 14 imp gal) compared to the 55-litre (15 US gal; 12 imp gal) of the standard, front-wheel drive versions.

The 4x4 option was only available with the 1.8 T 150 PS (110 kW) petrol engine, the 1.9 TDI 90 PS (66 kW) diesel engine, or the 2.0 L petrol engine, all coupled with a 5-speed manual gearbox, and with the 1.9 TDI-PD (Pumpe-Düse) 100 PS (74 kW) diesel engine which came with a 6-speed manual gearbox.

The other 6-speed manual model was the 1.9 TDI-PD 130 PS (96 kW), only available with front-wheel-drive.

The RS (vRS in the UK) was the top-level and quickest specification and used a 1.8-litre turbocharged straight-four engine which produced 180 PS (132 kW). Škoda made a limited number of 100 WRC Replica Cars worldwide in 2002. These differ from normal RS Octavias, as they are produced in white, have rally decals and have additional accessories as standard (such as ESP, xenon lights, heated front seats).

=== Engines ===
The engines used are the same as for many other cars in the Volkswagen Group:

Name	Displacement	Type	Power	Torque	Code	Years
Petrol
1.4 8v	1,397 cc (85.3 cu in)	4 cyl OHV	60 PS (44 kW; 59 hp) at 4500 rpm	120 N⋅m (89 lb⋅ft) at 2500 rpm	AMD	1999–2001
1.4 16v	1,390 cc (84.8 cu in)	4 cyl DOHC	75 PS (55 kW; 74 hp) at 5000 rpm	126 N⋅m (92.9 lb⋅ft) at 3800 rpm	AXP/BCA	2000–2005
1.6 8v	1,598 cc (97.5 cu in)	4 cyl SOHC	75 PS (55 kW; 74 hp) at 4800 rpm	135 N⋅m (100 lb⋅ft) at 2800–3600 rpm	AEE	1996–2000
1.6 8v	1,595 cc (97.3 cu in)	4 cyl SOHC	100 PS (74 kW; 99 hp) at 5600 rpm	145 N⋅m (107 lb⋅ft) at 3800 rpm	AEH/AKL	02.1997–12.2007
1.6 8v	1,595 cc (97.3 cu in)	4 cyl SOHC	102 PS (75 kW; 101 hp) at 5600 rpm	148 N⋅m (109 lb⋅ft) at 3800 rpm	AVU/BFQ	2000–2010
1.8 20v	1,781 cc (108.7 cu in)	4 cyl DOHC	125 PS (92 kW; 123 hp) at 6000 rpm	170 N⋅m (125 lb⋅ft) at 4200 rpm	AGN	1996–1999
1.8 20vT	1,781 cc (108.7 cu in)	4 cyl DOHC turbo	150 PS (110 kW; 148 hp) at 5700 rpm	210 N⋅m (155 lb⋅ft) at 1750–4600 rpm	AGU/ARZ/ARX*/AUM	1998–2009 (for Eastern Europe to 2010) *(ARX engine equip 4x4 models)
1.8 20vT	1,781 cc (108.7 cu in)	4 cyl DOHC turbo	193 PS (142 kW; 190 hp) at 5300 rpm	276 N⋅m (204 lb⋅ft) at 5020 rpm	AUM (with reprogrammed ECU)	2006-2011
1.8 20vT RS	1,781 cc (108.7 cu in)	4 cyl DOHC turbo	180 PS (132 kW; 178 hp) at 5500 rpm	235 N⋅m (173 lb⋅ft) at 1950–5000 rpm	AUQ	2001–2005
2.0 8v	1,984 cc (121.1 cu in)	4 cyl SOHC	115 PS (85 kW; 113 hp) at 5200 rpm	170 N⋅m (125 lb⋅ft) at 2400 rpm	APK/AQY	1999–2001
2.0 8v	1,984 cc (121.1 cu in)	4 cyl SOHC	115 PS (85 kW; 113 hp) at 5200 rpm	172 N⋅m (127 lb⋅ft) at 3200 rpm	AZJ/AZH*	2001–2005 *(AZJ engine equipped on 4x4 models)
Diesel
1.9 8v SDI	1,896 cc (115.7 cu in)	4 cyl SOHC	68 PS (50 kW; 67 hp) at 4200 rpm	133 N⋅m (98 lb⋅ft) at 2200–2600 rpm	AGP/AQM	1999–2004
1.9 8v TDI	1,896 cc (115.7 cu in)	4 cyl SOHC	90 PS (66 kW; 89 hp) at 4000 rpm	210 N⋅m (155 lb⋅ft) at 1900 rpm	AGR/ALH	1996–2005
1.9 8v TDI	1,896 cc (115.7 cu in)	4 cyl SOHC PD	100 PS (74 kW; 99 hp) at 4000 rpm	240 N⋅m (177 lb⋅ft) at 1800–2400 rpm	ATD*/AXR	2000–2010 *(ATD engine equip 4x4 models)
1.9 8v TDI	1,896 cc (115.7 cu in)	4 cyl SOHC	110 PS (81 kW; 108 hp) at 4150 rpm	235 N⋅m (173 lb⋅ft) at 1900 rpm	AHF/ASV	1997–2005
1.9 8v TDI	1,896 cc (115.7 cu in)	4 cyl SOHC PD	130 PS (96 kW; 128 hp) at 4000 rpm	310 N⋅m (229 lb⋅ft) at 1900 rpm	ASZ	2003–2004

=== Octavia L&K Long (2001) ===
A special version of the Octavia, lengthened by 8 cm (3.1 in), was produced in 2001 and only intended for government purposes. It was available in the Laurin & Klement trim (which included air conditioning, leather and cruise control among others), but also equipped with other features such as a telephone, reading lights and folding tables. The length was achieved by widening the centre pillar, increasing space for the rear seat passengers.

Supposedly, Škoda delivered only 25 automobiles to the state administration, five of them in the facelifted version. All were hand-built and the factory sold them below the build price.

=== Safety ===
Euro NCAP test results Škoda Octavia 1.9 TDi Ambiente (LHD) (2001)
Test	Score	Rating
Adult occupant:	25	4 /5 stars
Pedestrian:	14	2 /4 stars

== Second generation (Typ 1Z; 2004) ==
Škoda Octavia Mk2
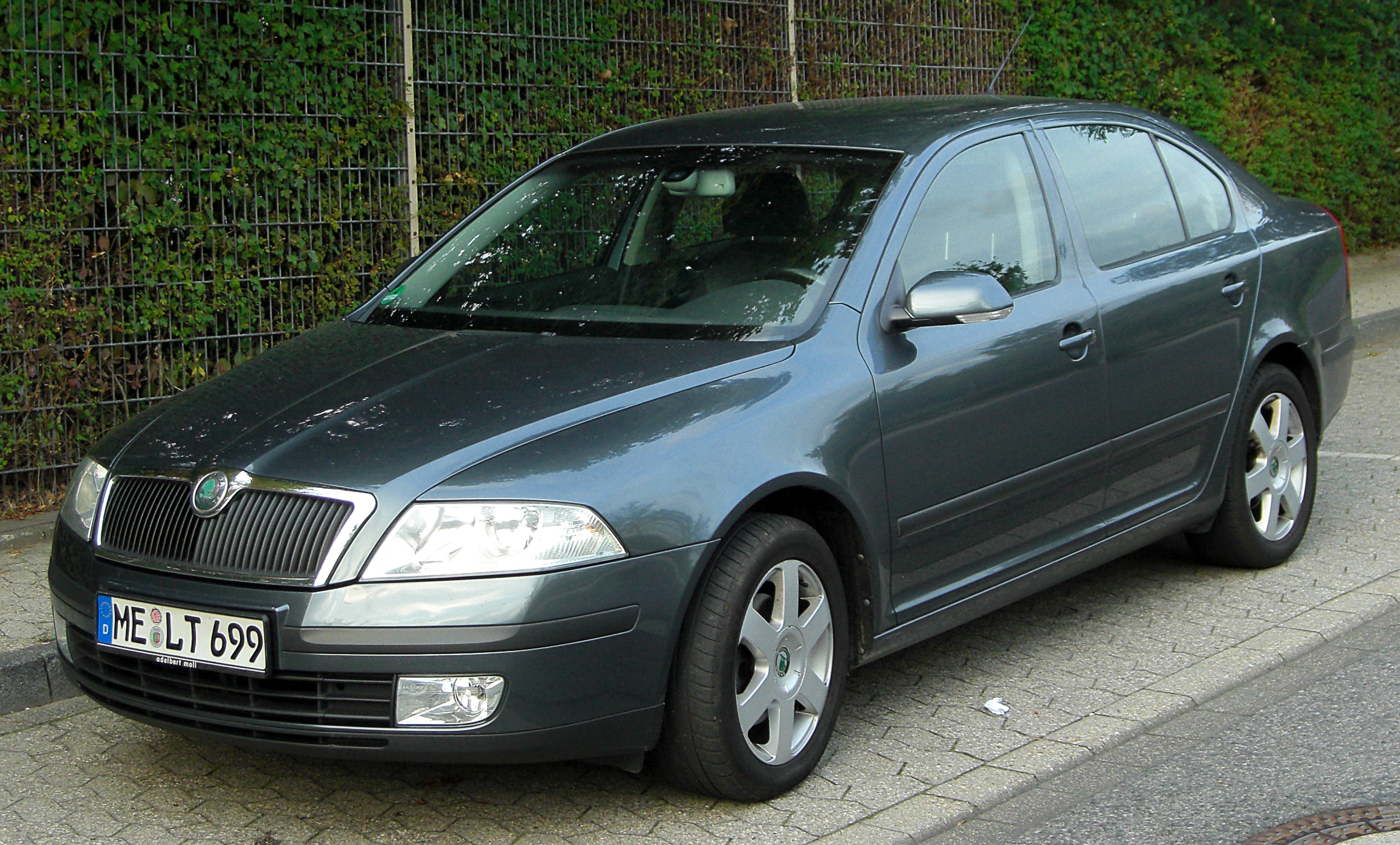

Overview
- Model code: 1Z
- Also called: Škoda Laura (India); Škoda Octavia Tour (pre-facelift version, 2010-12); Škoda Octavia Mingrui (China, since facelift in 2010); Škoda Fantasia (Egypt, facelift, 2009-2013); Škoda Scout (Spain, Octavia Scout)
- Production: March 2004–March 2013
- Assembly: Mladá Boleslav, Czech Republic; Vrchlabí, Czech Republic; Sarajevo, Bosnia and Herzegovina; Kaluga, Russia; Bratislava, Slovakia; Anting, China (SAIC-VW); Solomonovo, Ukraine (Eurocar); Aurangabad, India (Škoda India); Ust-Kamenogorsk, Kazakhstan; Luanda, Angola (Ancar)

Body and chassis
- Body style: 5-door liftback 5-door estate
- Platform: Volkswagen Group A5 (PQ35)
- Related: Audi A3 Mk2; SEAT León Mk2; SEAT Toledo Mk3; SEAT Altea; Volkswagen Golf Mk5; Volkswagen Golf Mk6; Volkswagen Jetta Mk5; Volkswagen Golf Plus; Volkswagen Caddy Mk3; Volkswagen Passat (B6/B7)

Powertrain
- Engine: Petrol: 1.2 L TSI SOHC I4; 1.4 L MPI DOHC I4; 1.4 L TSI DOHC I4; 1.6 L SOHC I4; 1.6 L MPI SOHC I4; 1.6 L FSI DOHC I4; 1.8 L TSI DOHC I4; 2.0 L MPI DOHC I4; 2.0 L FSI DOHC I4; 2.0 L TFSI DOHC I4; 2.0 L TSI DOHC I4; Diesel: 1.6 L TDI CR DOHC I4; 1.9 L TDI PD SOHC I4; 2.0 L TDI PD SOHC I4; 2.0 L TDI PD DOHC I4; 2.0 L TDI CR DOHC I4
- Transmission: 5/6-speed manual 6-speed automatic 6/7-speed DSG dual-clutch automatic

Dimensions
- Wheelbase: 2,578 mm (101.5 in)
- Length: 4,569 mm (179.9 in)
- Width: 1,769 mm (69.6 in)
- Height: 1,468 mm (57.8 in) (liftback); 1,490 mm (58.7 in) (estate)
- Kerb weight: 1,265–1,490 kg (2,789–3,285 lb)

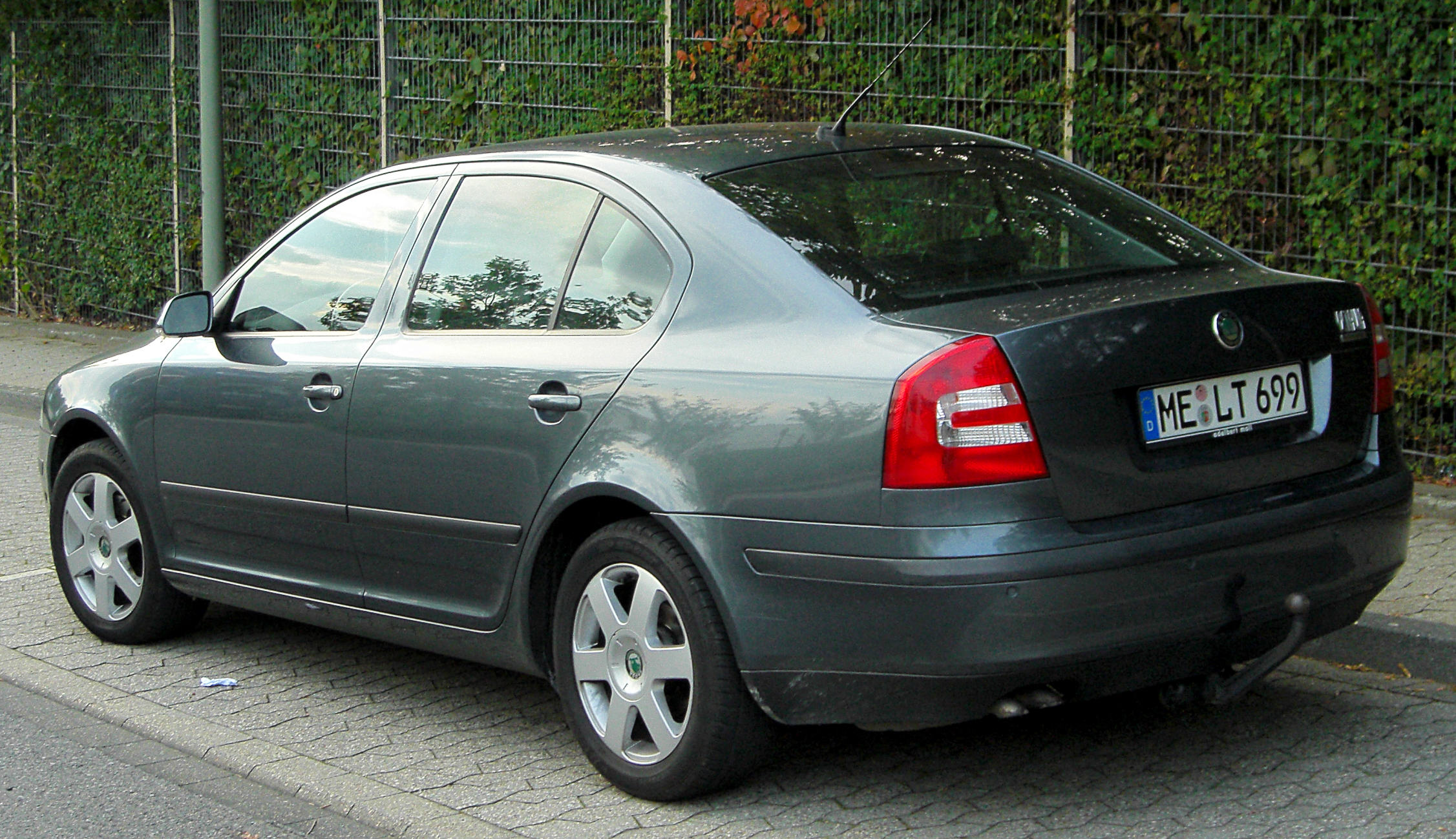
Liftback (pre-facelift)

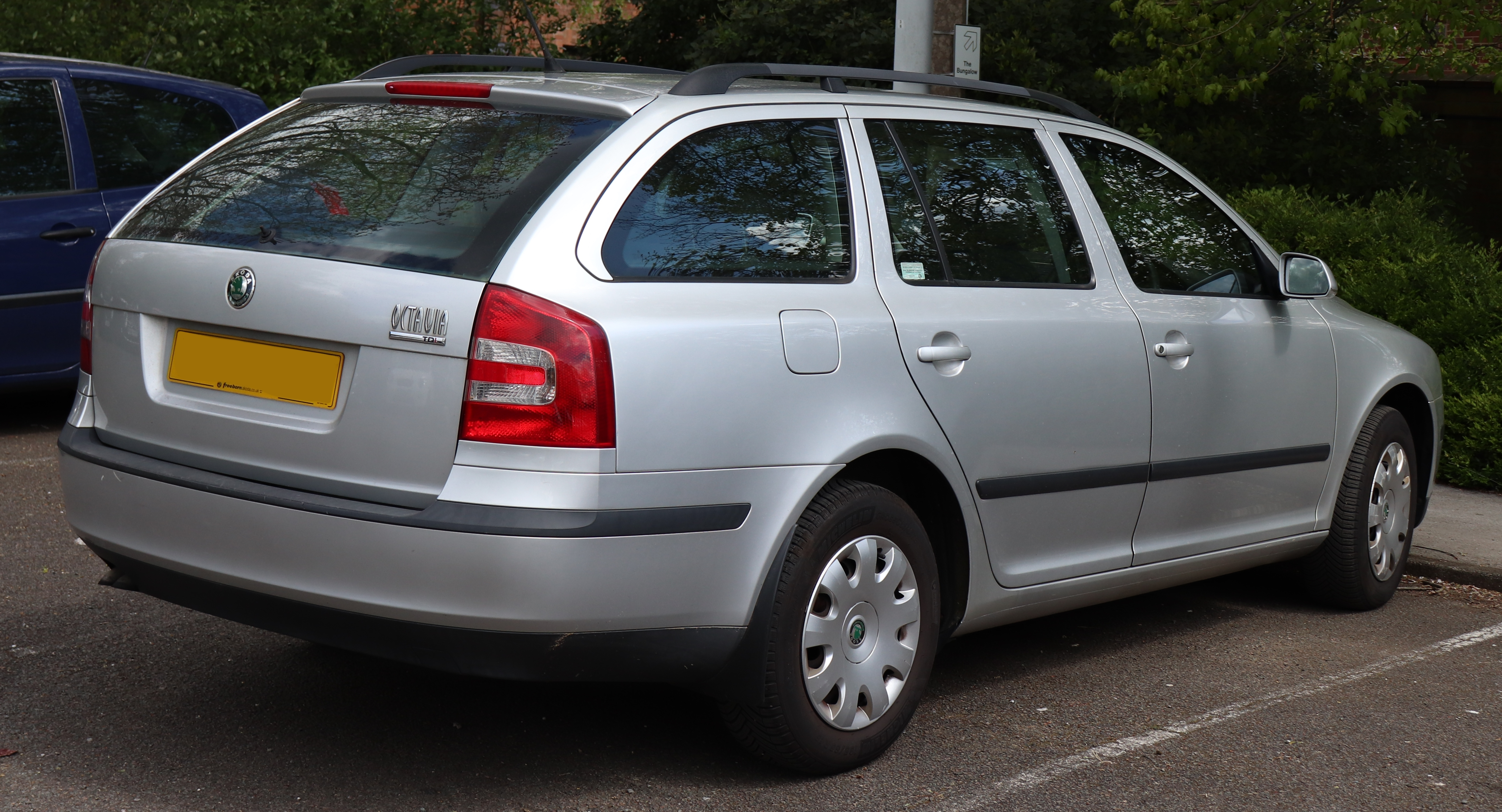
Combi (pre-facelift)

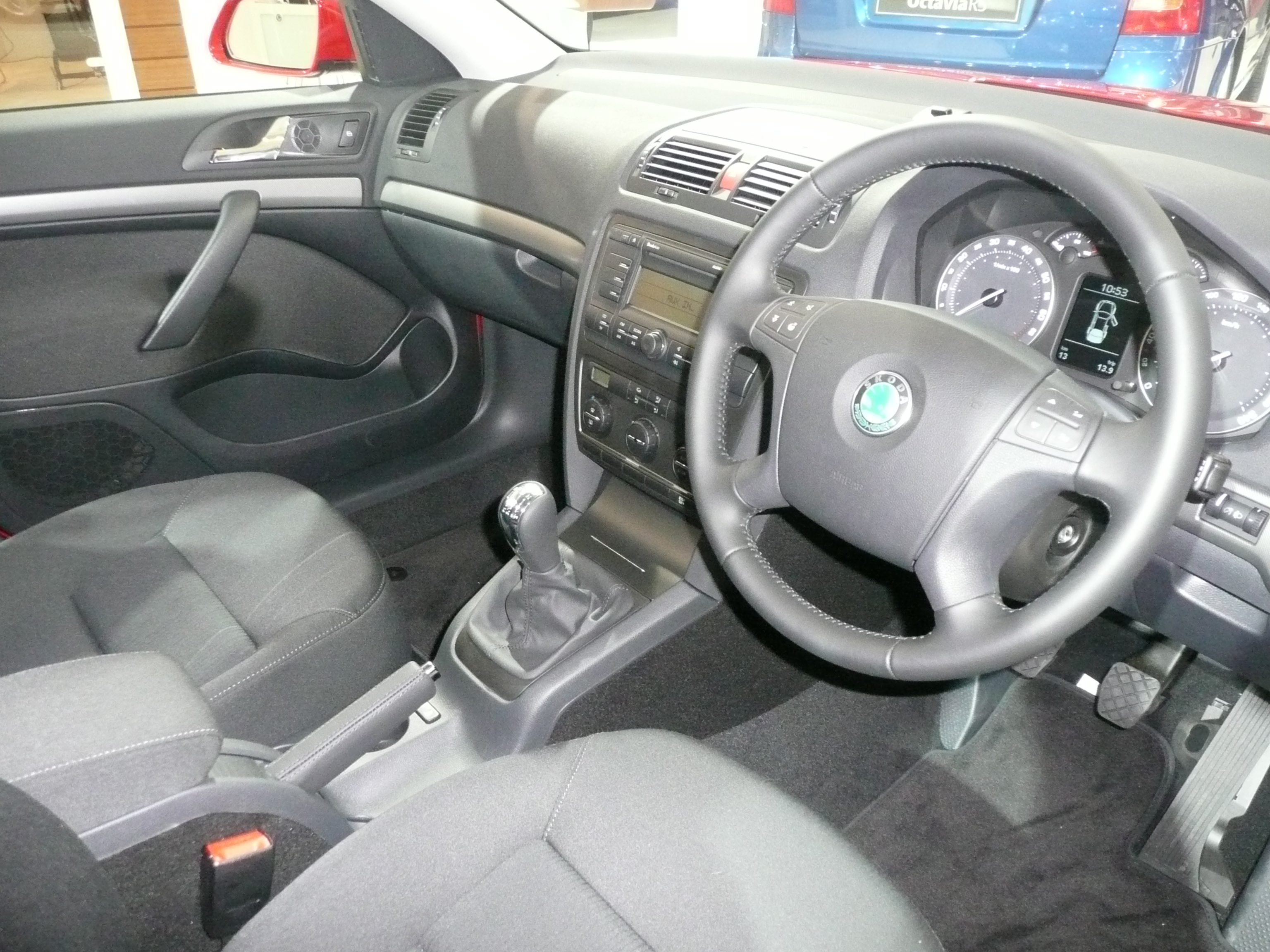
Interior (pre-facelift)

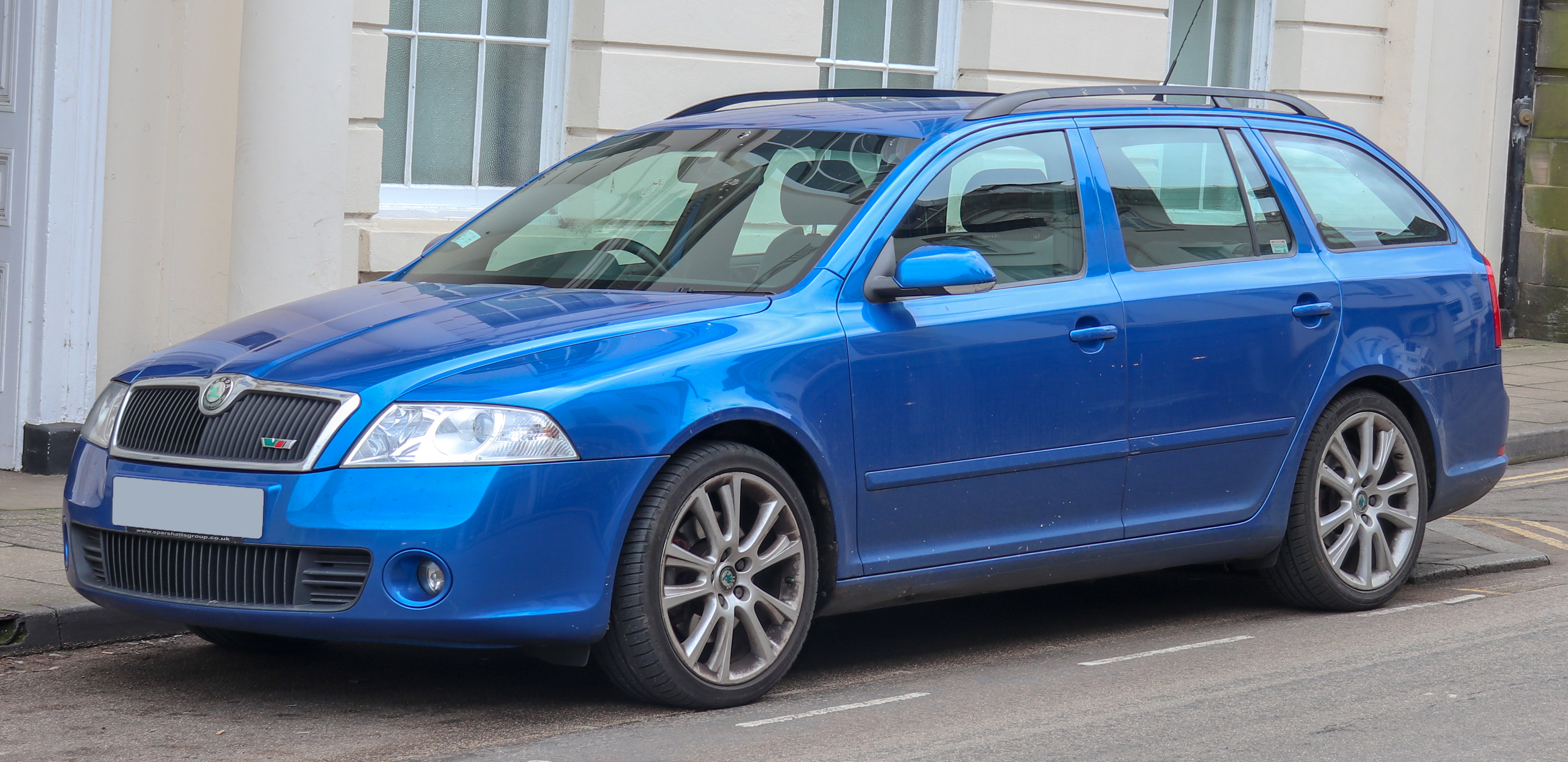

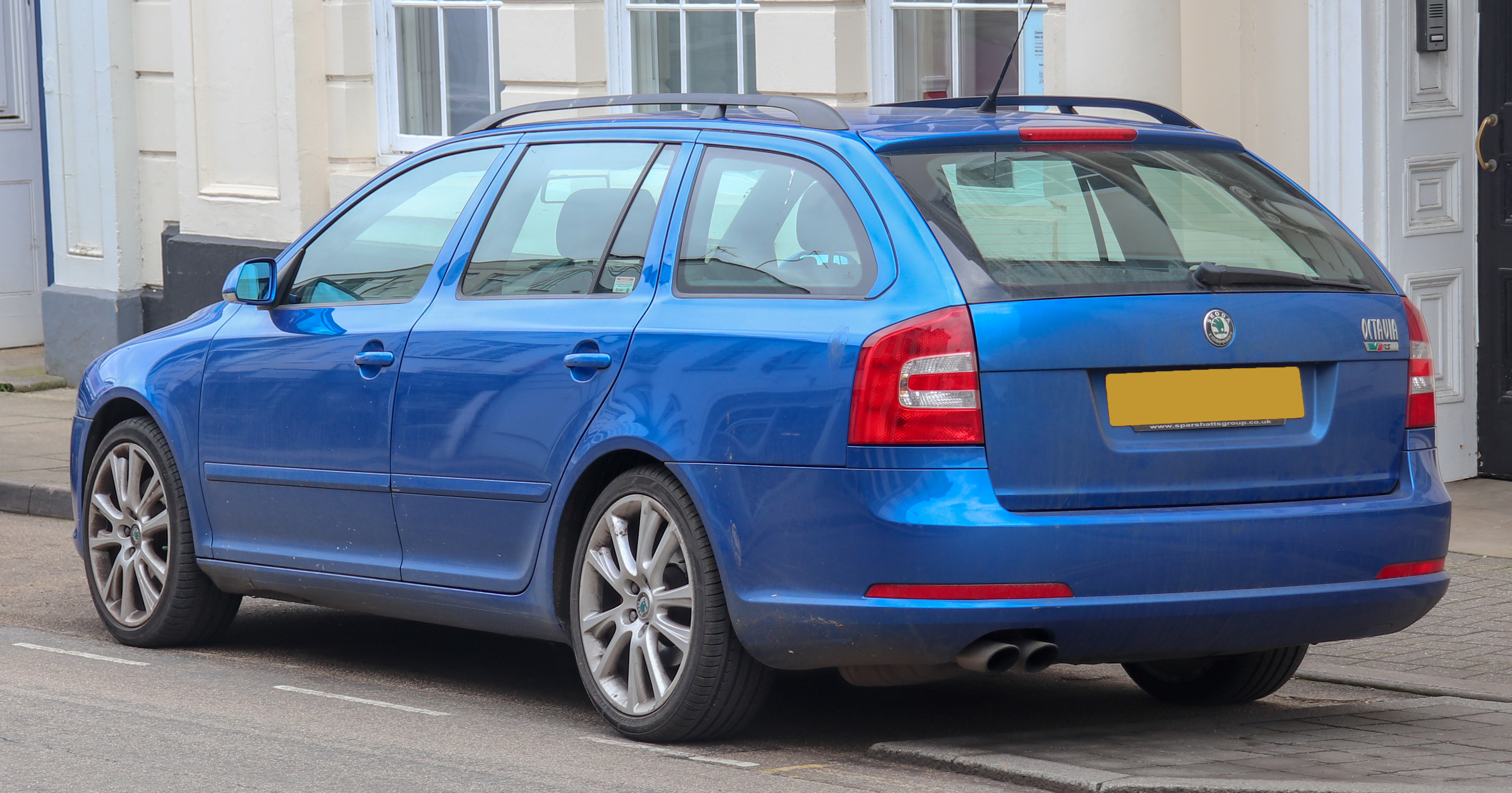
Škoda Octavia VRS Estate (pre-facelift)

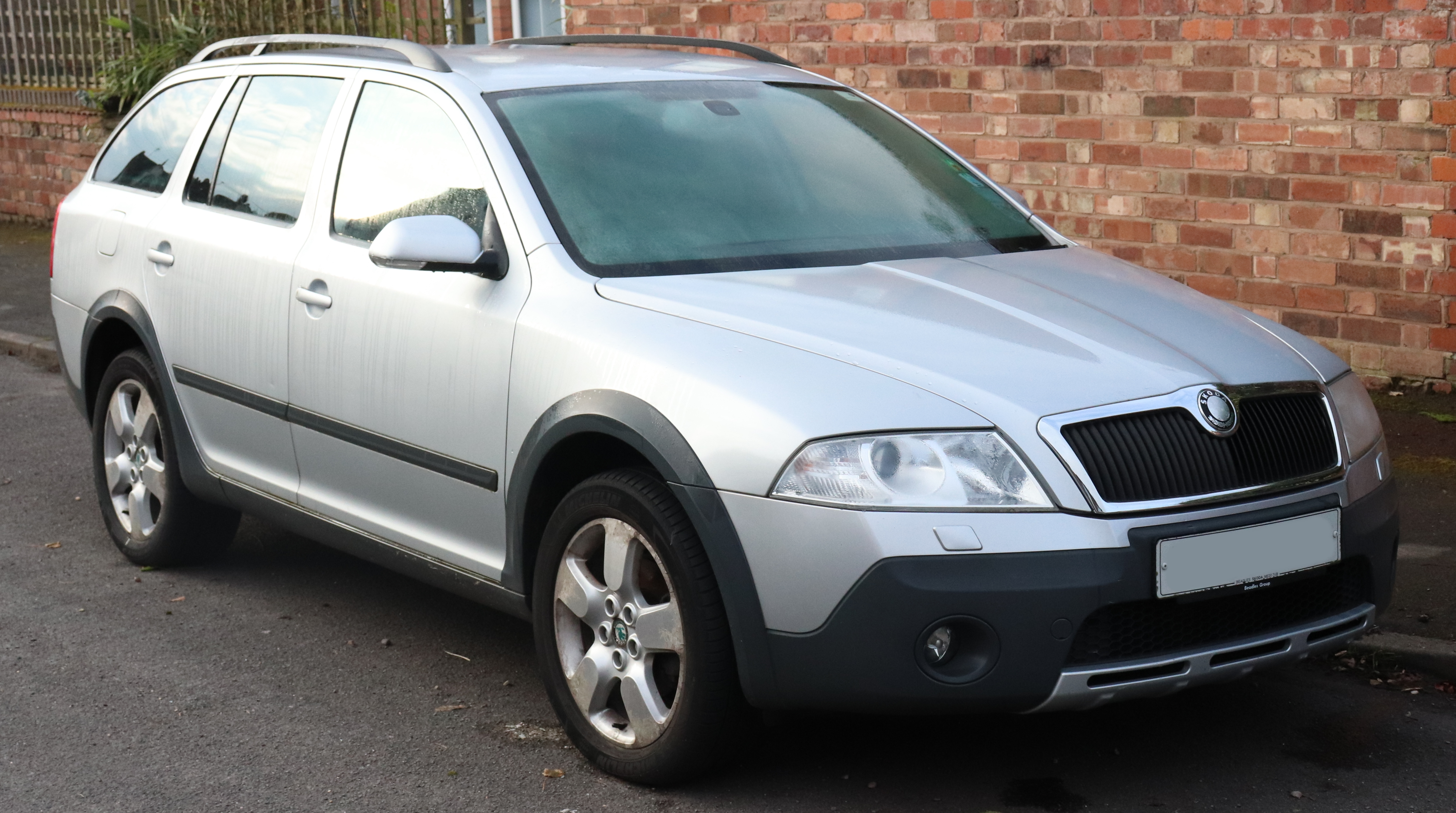

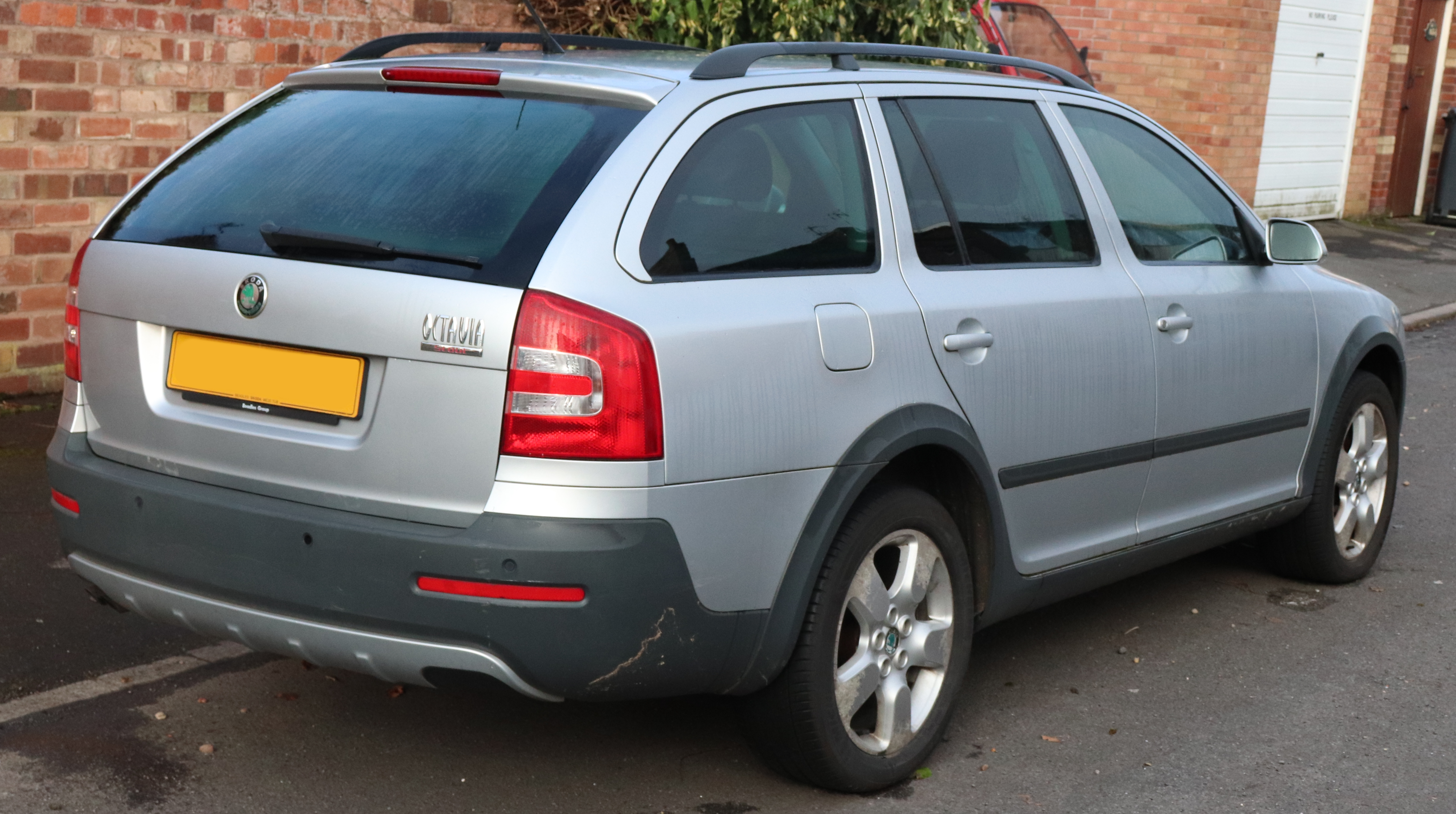
Octavia Scout (pre-facelift)

The second-generation Octavia was introduced in March 2004, based on the Volkswagen Group A5 (PQ35) platform also used by other Volkswagen Group cars, such as the Audi A3 Mk2, Volkswagen Golf Mk5, Volkswagen Jetta Mk5, SEAT León Mk2, etc.

Responsible for the design were Thomas Ingenlath and Peter Wouda. Along with a new internal-combustion engine range, also shared with other models of the Volkswagen Group, body changes included more legroom for rear-seat passengers (a weak point in the original model) and increased ground clearance at front and rear to reduce the risk of grounding on steep ramps or facing kerbs.

In addition to the Czech factories in Mladá Boleslav and Vrchlabí, from 2008, the Octavia has also been produced at a factory in Bratislava, Slovakia, and in Shanghai, China, under the joint venture of Shanghai Volkswagen. In Russia, the Octavia is assembled at the Volkswagen plant in Kaluga.

In India, the second-generation Octavia was marketed as the Laura to distinguish it from the first generation. The car was marketed in a higher-income segment, and was sold alongside the previous-generation Octavia. However, the first generation ended production in India in 2010, and as of 2012, the Laura's price was reduced and was competing in its predecessor's segment.

Two four-wheel-drive versions of the Octavia are made: the 4x4 and the Scout, both featuring a Haldex Traction four-wheel-drive system, based on a computer-controlled clutch centre coupling. The two models both have higher ground clearance than the standard Octavia, increased by 24 mm (0.9 in) for the 4x4 and by 40 mm (1.6 in) for the Scout.

The Scout, announced in 2006, is only available with the estate body style, and has several crossover-style exterior modifications, such as larger bumpers.

In August 2011, a special Škoda Octavia RS hit the world record on the American Bonneville Speedway and became the fastest car in the world with an up to two-litre engine, when it hit 365.43 km/h (227 mph).

=== Engines ===
Several engine options are available. All engines are inline-four cylinder designs, water-cooled and use multipoint fuel injection. All diesel engines are turbocharged direct injection (TDI) engines.

Engine	Displacement, valvetrain, fuel system	Max. power at rpm	Max. torque at rpm	Code	Years
Petrol engines
1.2 TSI	1197 cc 8v OHC; Turbocharged Fuel Stratified Injection	105 PS (77 kW; 104 bhp) at 5,000	175 N⋅m (129 lb⋅ft) at 1,550–4,100	CBZB	2010– 2013
1.4 MPI	1390 cc 16v DOHC	80 PS (59 kW; 79 bhp) at 5,000	132 N⋅m (97 lb⋅ft) at 3,800	BUD, CGGA	2006–2013
1.4 TSI	1390 cc 16v DOHC; Turbocharged Fuel Stratified Injection	122 PS (90 kW; 120 bhp) at 5,000	200 N⋅m (148 lb⋅ft) at 1,500–4,000	CAXA	2008– 2013
1.4 TSI	1390 cc 16v DOHC; Turbocharged Fuel Stratified Injection	130 PS (96 kW; 128 bhp) at 5,000	220 N⋅m (162 lbf⋅ft) at 1,750–3,500	CAXA	2010– 2013 (only for China)
1.6 8V	1595 cc 8v SOHC	102 PS (75 kW; 101 bhp) at 5,600	148 N⋅m (109 lbf⋅ft) at 3,800	BGU, BSE, BSF, CCSA	2004– 2013
1.6 MPI	1595 cc 16V SOHC	105 PS (77 kW; 104 bhp) at 5,000	153 N⋅m (113 lbf⋅ft) at 3,800	BGU, BSE, BSF, CCSA	2007– 2013
1.6 FSI	1598 cc 16v DOHC; Fuel Stratified Injection	115 PS (85 kW; 113 bhp) at 6,000	155 N⋅m (114 lbf⋅ft) at 4,000	BLF	2004– 2008
1.8 TSI (Note: Badged 1.8 TFSI in some countries)	1798 cc 16v DOHC; Turbocharged Fuel Stratified Injection	160 PS (118 kW; 158 bhp) at 5,000–6,200	250 N⋅m (184 lbf⋅ft) at 1,500–4,200	BZB, CDAB	2006-2013
2.0 MPI	1984 cc 16v DOHC	120 PS (88 kW; 118 bhp) at 5,000	180 N⋅m (133 lbf⋅ft) at 3,750		200?– 2013 (only for China)
2.0 FSI	1984 cc 16v DOHC; Fuel Stratified Injection	150 PS (110 kW; 148 bhp) at 6,000	200 N⋅m (148 lbf⋅ft) at 3,500	BLR, BLX, BVX, BVY	2004– 2008
2.0 TFSI RS	1984 cc 16v DOHC; Turbocharged Fuel Stratified Injection	200 PS (147 kW; 197 bhp) at 5,100–6,000	280 N⋅m (207 lbf⋅ft) at 1,800–5,000	BWA	10.2005– 10.2008
2.0 TSI RS	1984 cc 16v DOHC; Turbocharged Fuel Stratified Injection	200 PS (147 kW; 197 bhp) at 5,100–6,000	280 N⋅m (207 lbf⋅ft) at 1,700–5,000	CCZA	11.2008– 2012
Diesel engines
1.6 TDI DPF	1598 cc 16v DOHC common rail (CR)	105 PS (77 kW; 104 bhp) at 4,400	250 N⋅m (184 lbf⋅ft) at 1,500–2,500	CAYC	2009– 2013
1.9 TDI (Note: Diesel particulate filter available as an option)	1896 cc 8v SOHC; PD (Pumpe Düse - Unit Injector)	105 PS (77 kW; 104 bhp) at 4,000	250 N⋅m (184 lbf⋅ft) at 1,900	BJB, BKC, BXE, BLS	2004– 2010
2.0 TDI DPF	1968 cc 8v SOHC; PD (Pumpe Düse - Unit Injector)	140 PS (103 kW; 138 bhp) at 4,000	320 N⋅m (236 lbf⋅ft) at 1,750	BMM	2007– 2013
2.0 TDI (Note: Diesel particulate filter not available)	1968 cc 16v DOHC; PD (Pumpe Düse - Unit Injector)	136 PS (100 kW; 134 bhp) at 4,000	320 N⋅m (236 lbf⋅ft) at 1,750	AZV	2004– 2008
2.0 TDI	1968 cc 16v DOHC; PD (Pumpe Düse - Unit Injector)	140 PS (103 kW; 138 bhp) at 4,000	320 N⋅m (236 lbf⋅ft) at 1,750	BKD	2004– 2008
2.0 TDI DPF	1968 cc 16v DOHC common rail (CR)	140 PS (103 kW; 138 bhp) at 4,000	320 N⋅m (236 lbf⋅ft) at 1,750–2,500	CBAA, CBAB, CBDB, CFHC	2010– 2013
2.0 TDI DPF RS	1968 cc 16v DOHC; PD (Pumpe Düse - Unit Injector)	170 PS (125 kW; 168 bhp) at 4,200	350 N⋅m (258 lbf⋅ft) at 1,750	BMN	2006– 2008
2.0 TDI DPF RS	1968 cc 16v DOHC common rail (CR)	170 PS (125 kW; 168 bhp) at 4,200	350 N⋅m (258 lbf⋅ft) at 1,750–2,500	CEGA	2008– 2013

=== Trim levels ===
In the United Kingdom, the Octavia is available in these trim levels: Classic (now called S), Ambiente (now called SE), 4x4 (estate only), Elegance, Laurin & Klement, Scout 4x4 (estate only), and vRS. All models come with four airbags, electric front windows, air conditioning, central locking and anti-lock braking system. In some markets, including British and Czech, a version aimed to lower fuel consumption called Greenline is also available. As of September 2011, trim levels have been renamed to Active (Classic) and Ambition (Ambiente).

=== Facelift ===
A facelifted version was launched in 2009, after being formally unveiled at the 2008 Paris Motor Show. The modifications of the facelifted version include aesthetic exterior changes, mechanical changes, and interior features. Externally, the designs of the headlights and bumpers were revised. Some changes were made to the range of available engines and manual and automatic gearboxes, with the 1.4 TSI and 1.8 TSI engines and the seven-speed direct-shift gearbox transmission available for the first time. Inside the car, the stereo and steering wheels were revised, along with some of the interior trim.

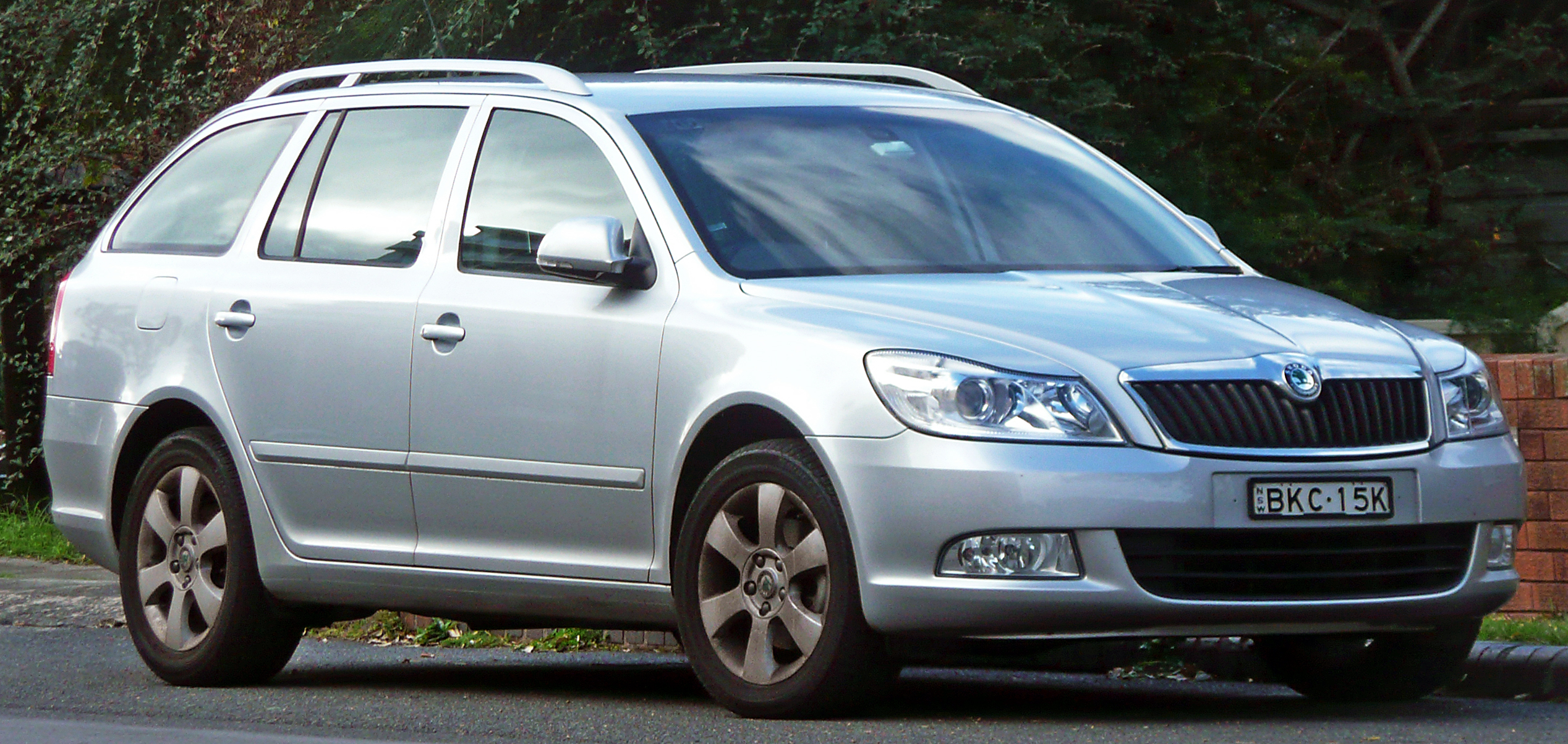
Combi facelift

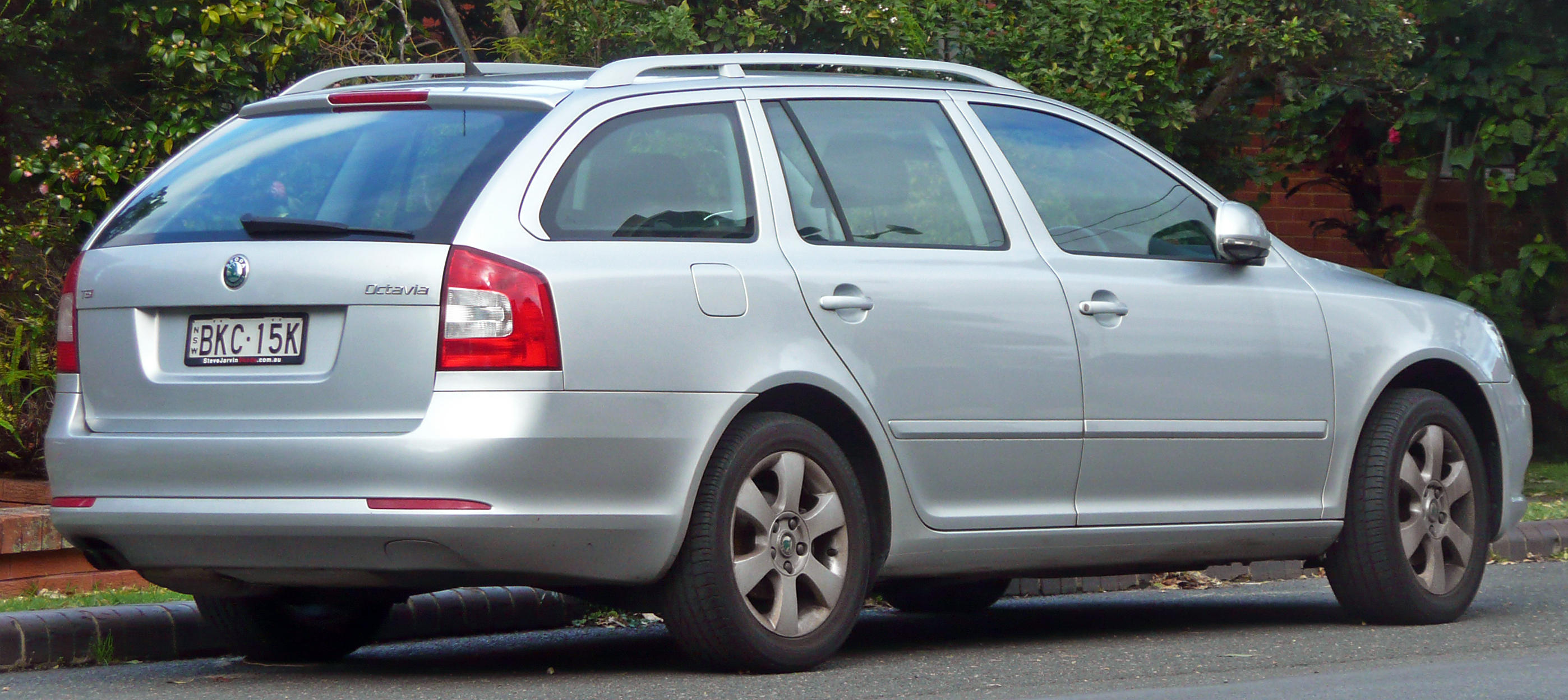
Combi facelift

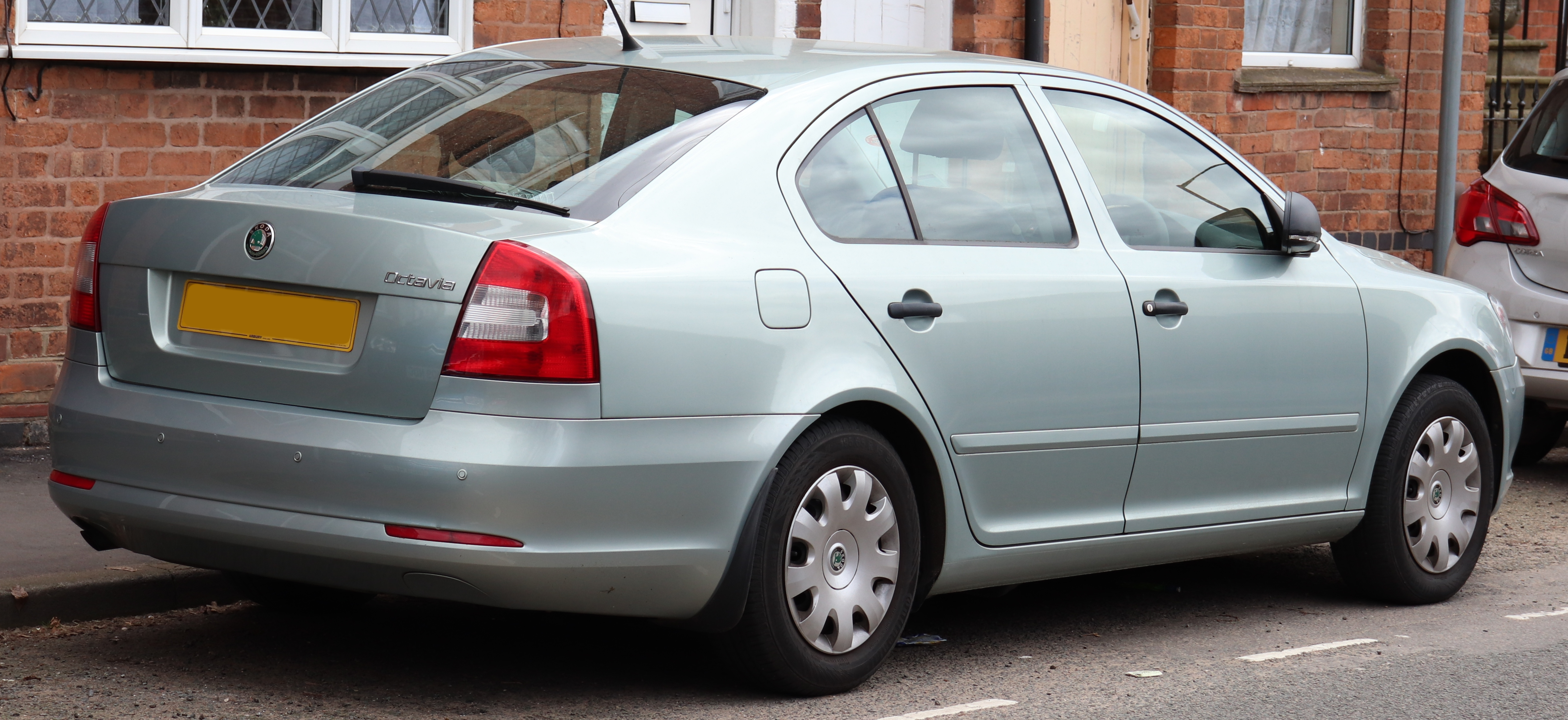
Liftback facelift

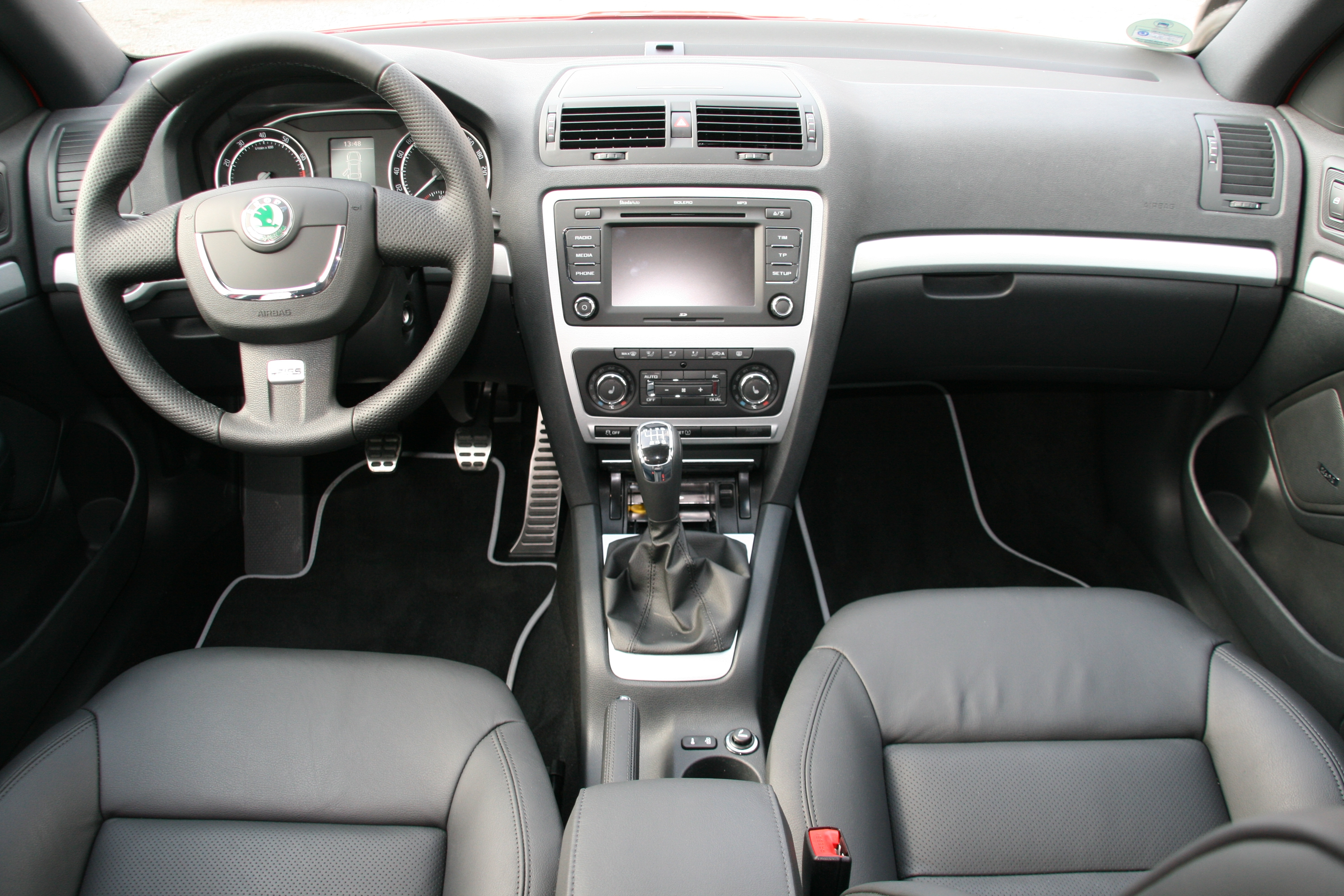
Interior facelift

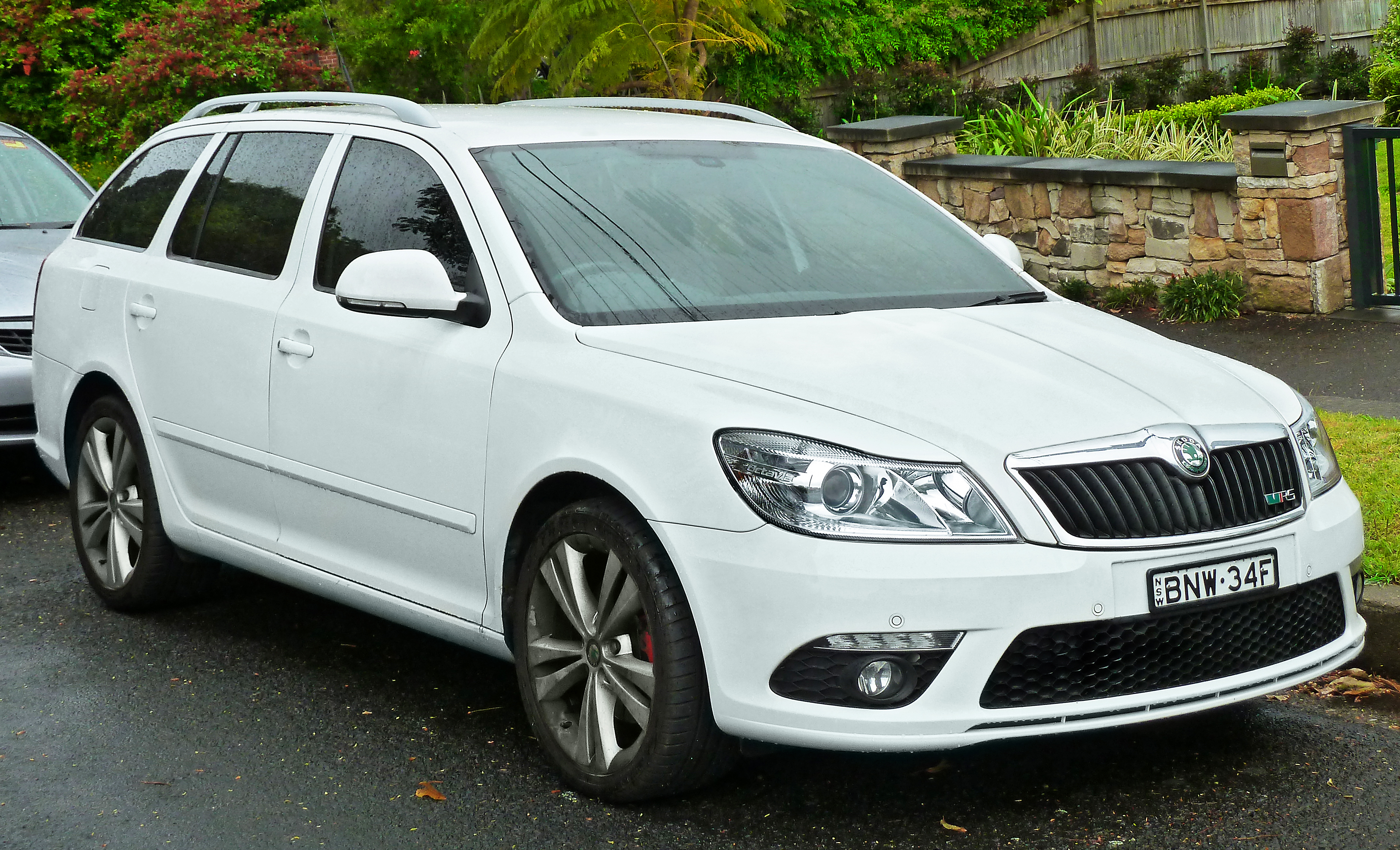
Octavia RS facelift

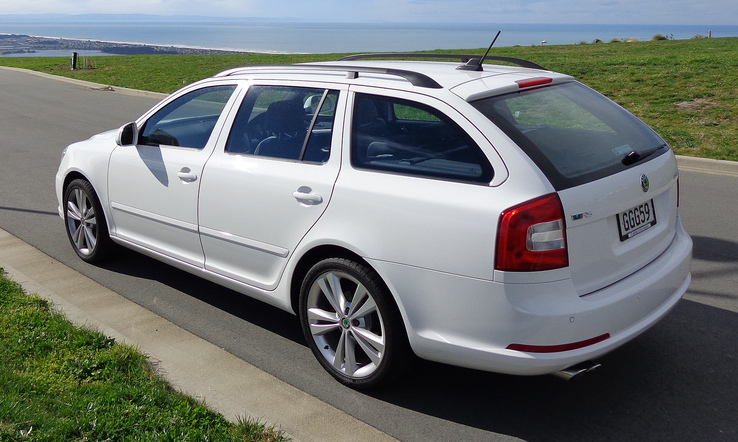
Octavia vRS facelift

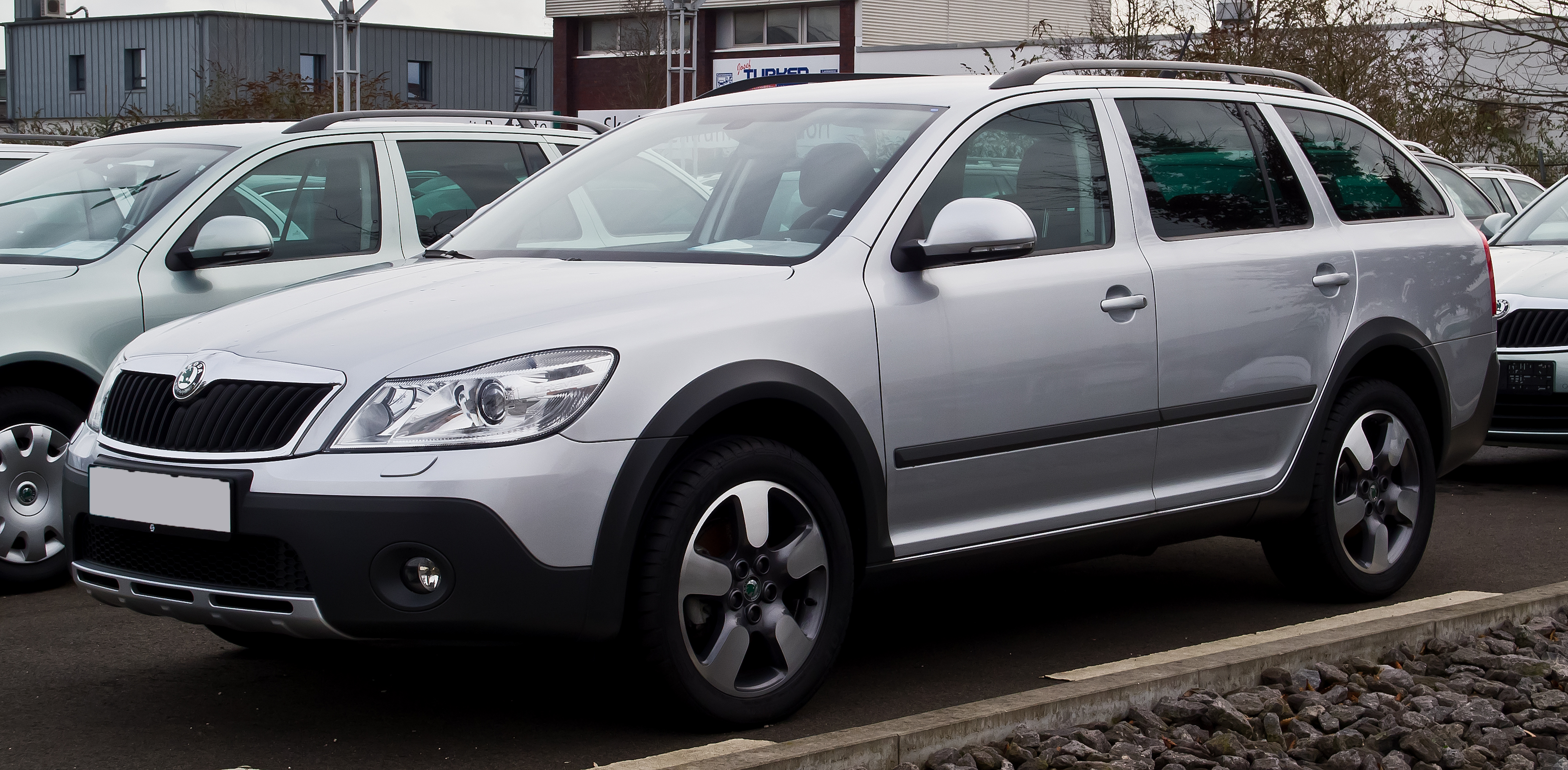
Octavia Scout facelift

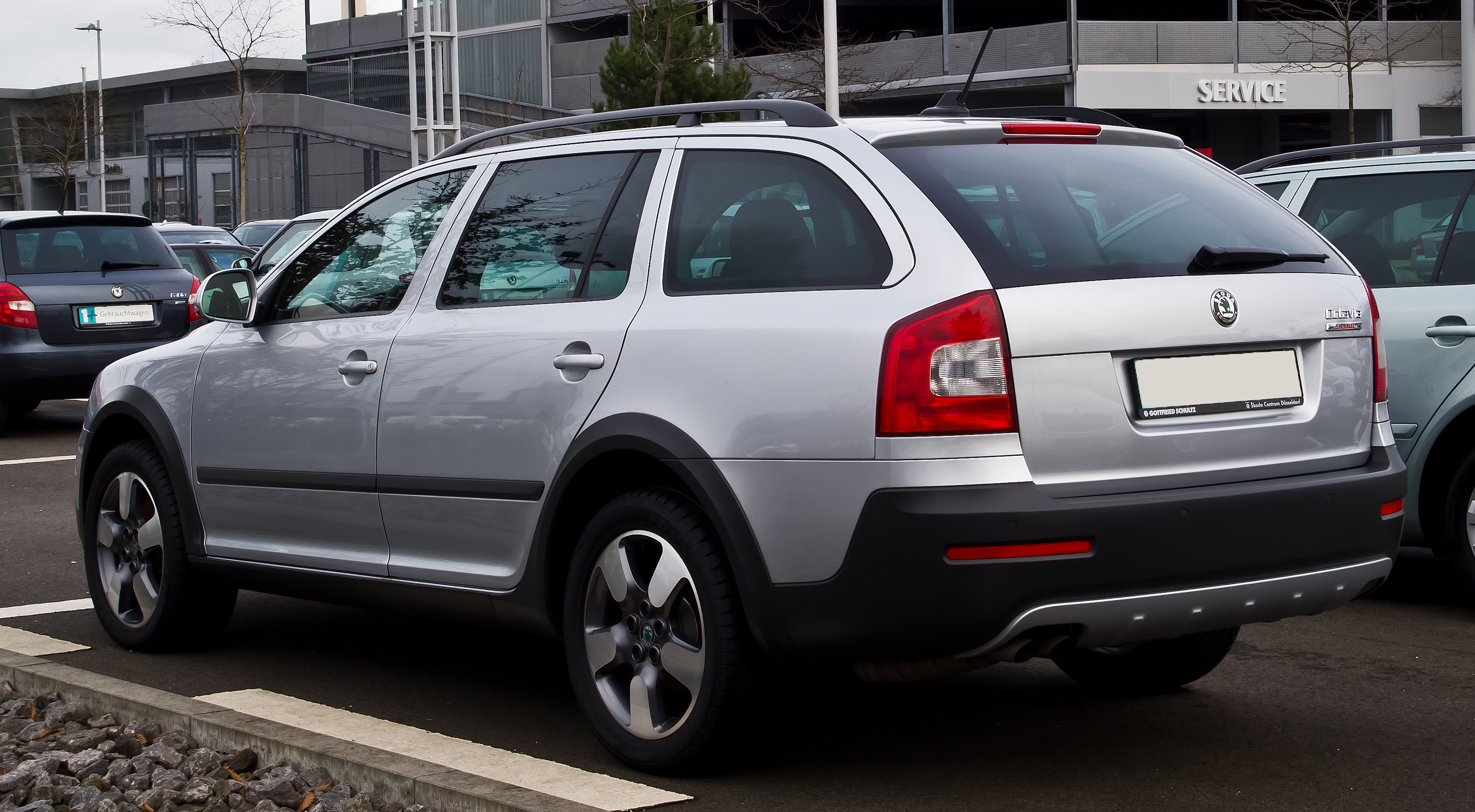
Octavia Scout facelift

=== Safety ===
Euro NCAP test results Škoda Octavia 1.6 Ambiente (RHD) (2004)
Test	Score	Rating
Adult occupant:	27	4 /5 stars
Child occupant:	37	4 /5 stars
Pedestrian:	17	2 /4 stars

ANCAP test results Skoda Octavia (2007)
Test	Score
Overall	4 /5 stars
Frontal offset	10.73/16
Side impact	16/16
Pole	Not Assessed
Seat belt reminders	2/3
Whiplash protection	Not Assessed
Pedestrian protection	Marginal
Electronic stability control	Standard

== Third generation (Typ 5E; 2012) ==
Škoda Octavia Mk3
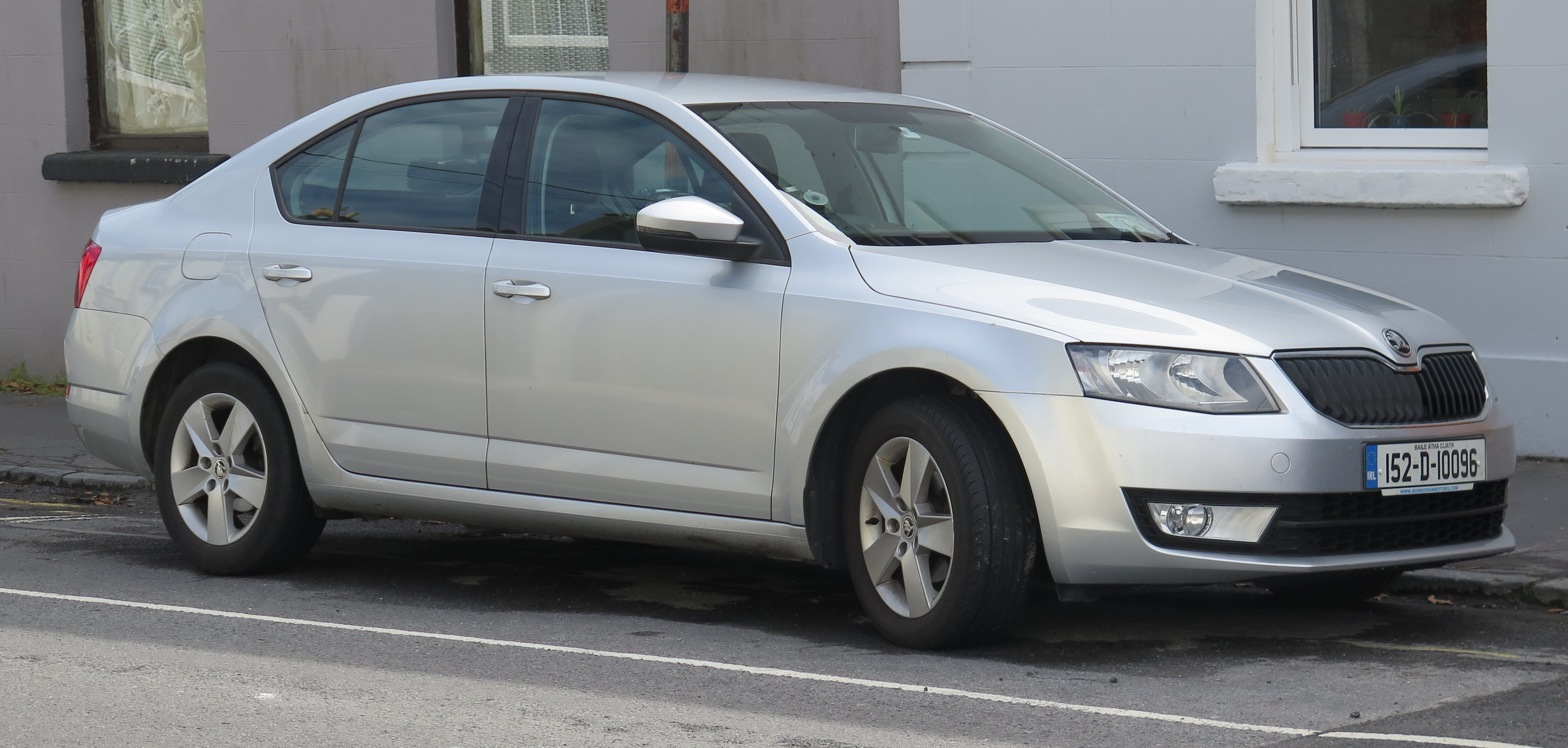

Overview
- Model code: 5E
- Also called: Škoda Scout (Spain, Octavia Scout)
- Production: December 2012–2019; 2014–2023 (China)
- Assembly: Mladá Boleslav, Czech Republic; Nizhny Novgorod, Russia; Ningbo, China; Aurangabad, India; Ust-Kamenogorsk, Kazakhstan; Solomonovo, Ukraine; Relizane, Algeria
- Designer: Jozef Kabaň

Body and chassis
- Body style: 5-door liftback 5-door estate
- Platform: Volkswagen Group MQB platform
- Related: Audi A3 Mk3; Audi TT Mk3; SEAT León Mk3; Volkswagen Golf Mk7

Powertrain
- Engine: Petrol: 1.0 L TSI DOHC I3; 1.2 L TSI DOHC I4; 1.4 L TSI DOHC I4; 1.5 L TSI DOHC I4; 1.6 L MPI DOHC I4 (for Egypt/Russia/China); 1.8 L TSI DOHC I4; 2.0 L TSI DOHC I4; Petrol CNG: 1.4 L TSI DOHC I4; Diesel: 1.6 L TDI CR DOHC I4; 2.0 L TDI CR DOHC I4
- Transmission: 5/6-speed manual 6/7-speed automatic (DSG)

Dimensions
- Wheelbase: 2,686 mm (105.7 in); 2,680 mm (105.5 in) (1.8TSI and 4x4)
- Length: 4,659 mm (183.4 in); 4,689 mm (184.6 in) (RS)
- Width: 1,814 mm (71.4 in)
- Height: 1,461 mm (57.5 in) (liftback); 1,465 mm (57.7 in) (estate)
- Kerb weight: 1,150–1,450 kg (2,540–3,200 lb)

The third-generation Octavia was revealed on 11 December 2012 at the Škoda Museum in Mladá Boleslav. The car began to appear in showrooms in key European markets in February 2013.

Previously, photos of the car covered in light camouflage were released to the media in late October 2012, after other pre-production cars had already been spotted on several occasions during the same month. It was once again spotted, this time without camouflage, on 18 November 2012 in Santiago, Chile, in both liftback and estate body styles, during the filming of a TV advertisement.

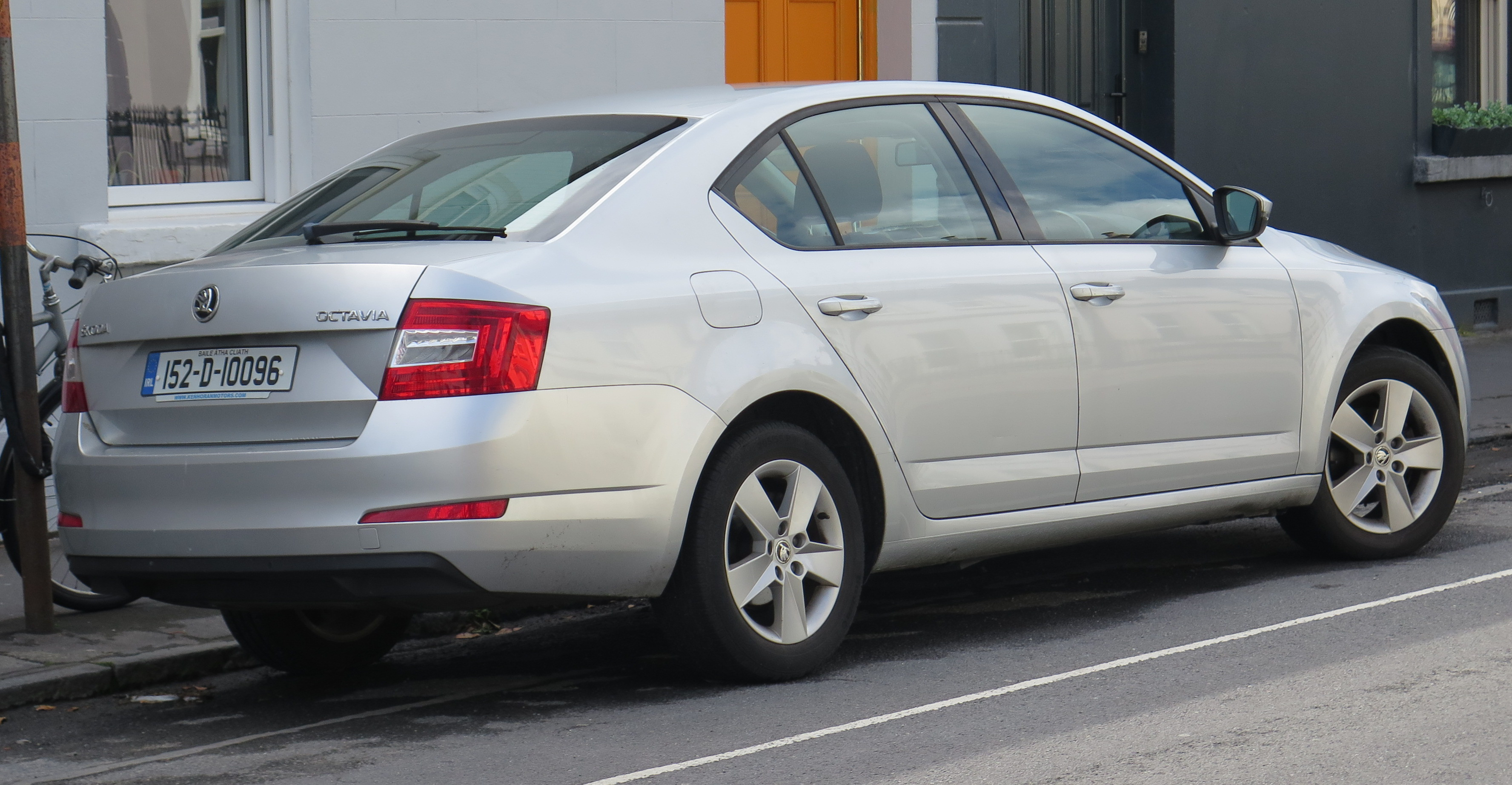
Liftback (pre-facelift)

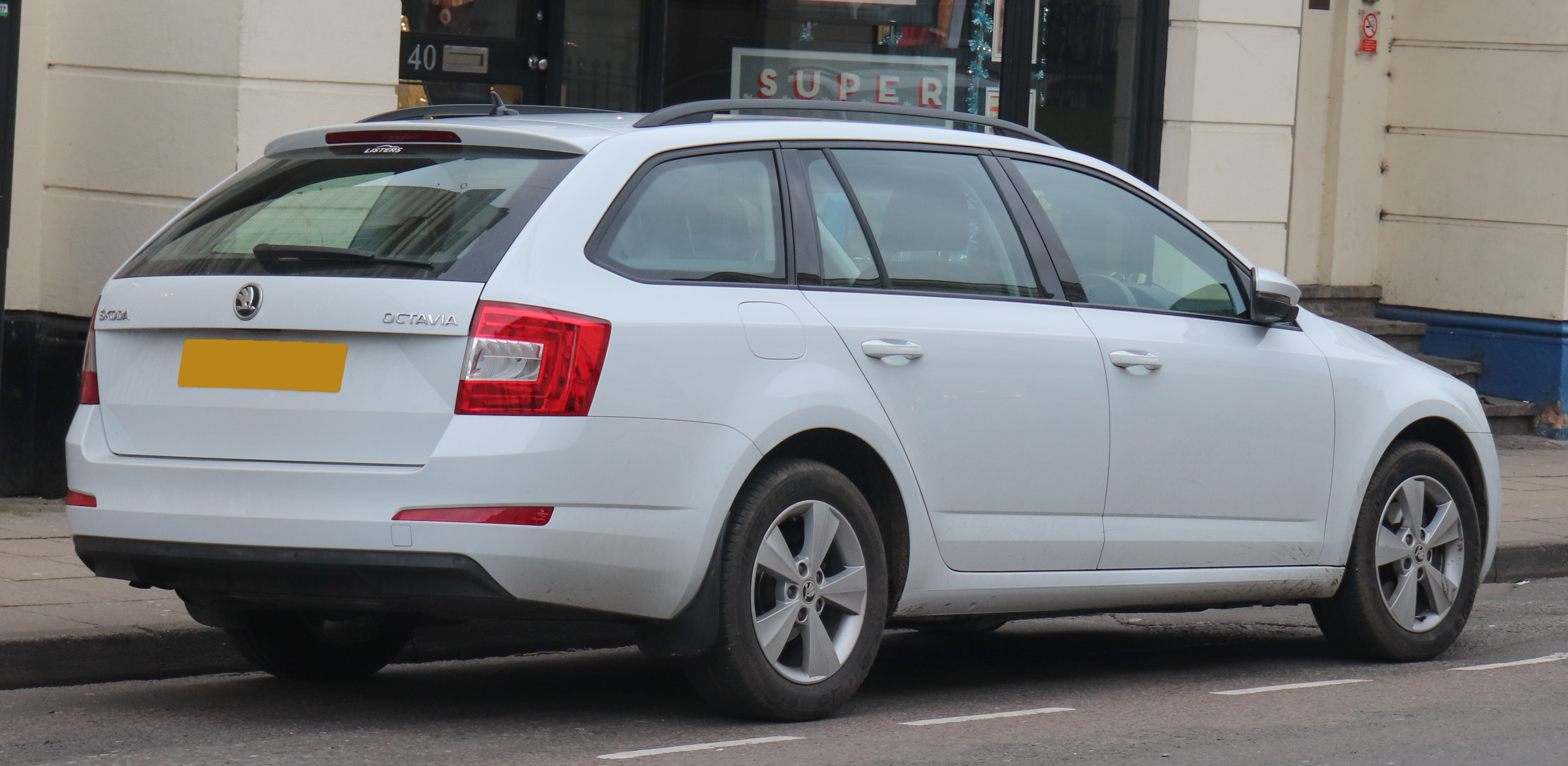
Estate (pre-facelift)

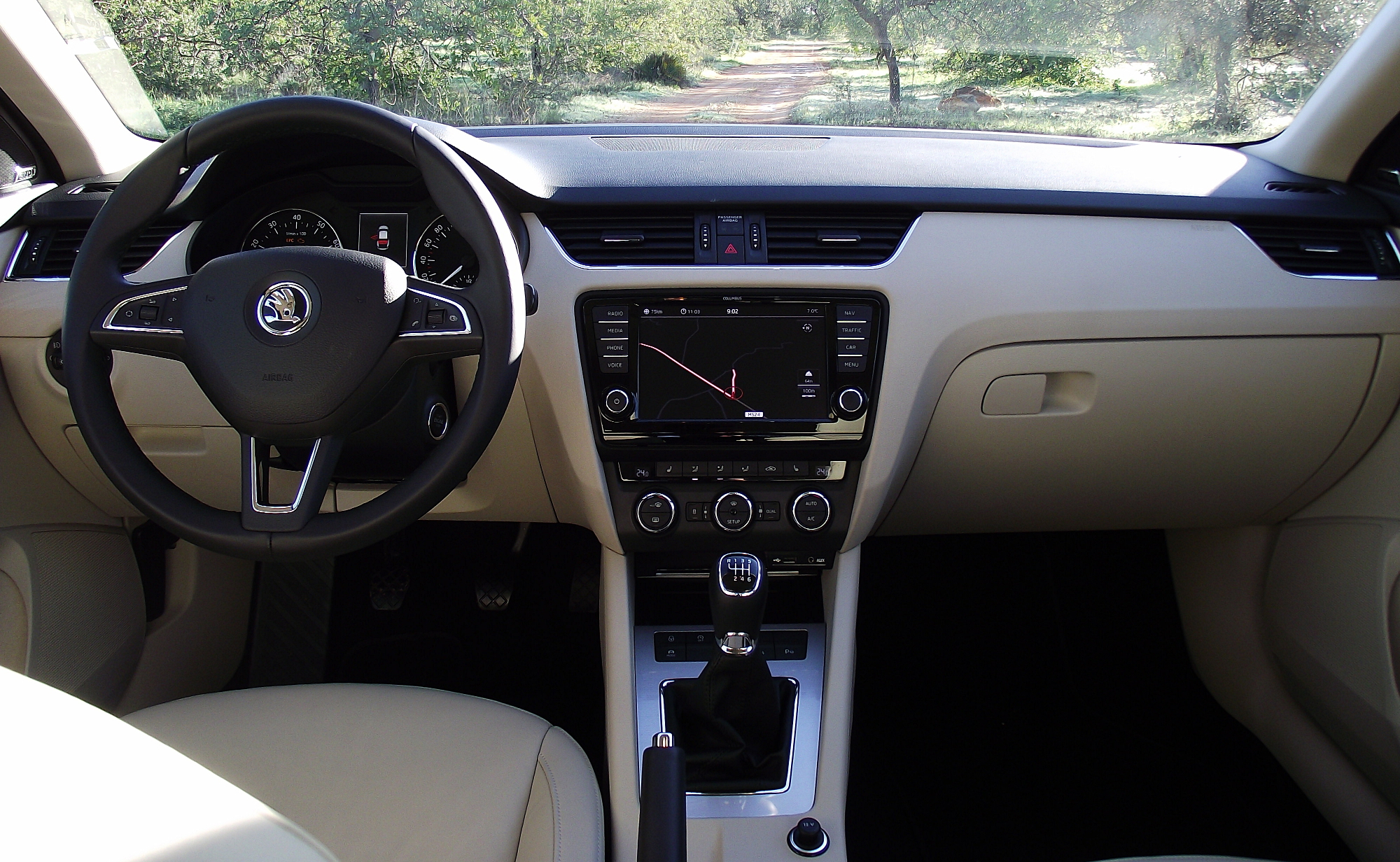
Interior

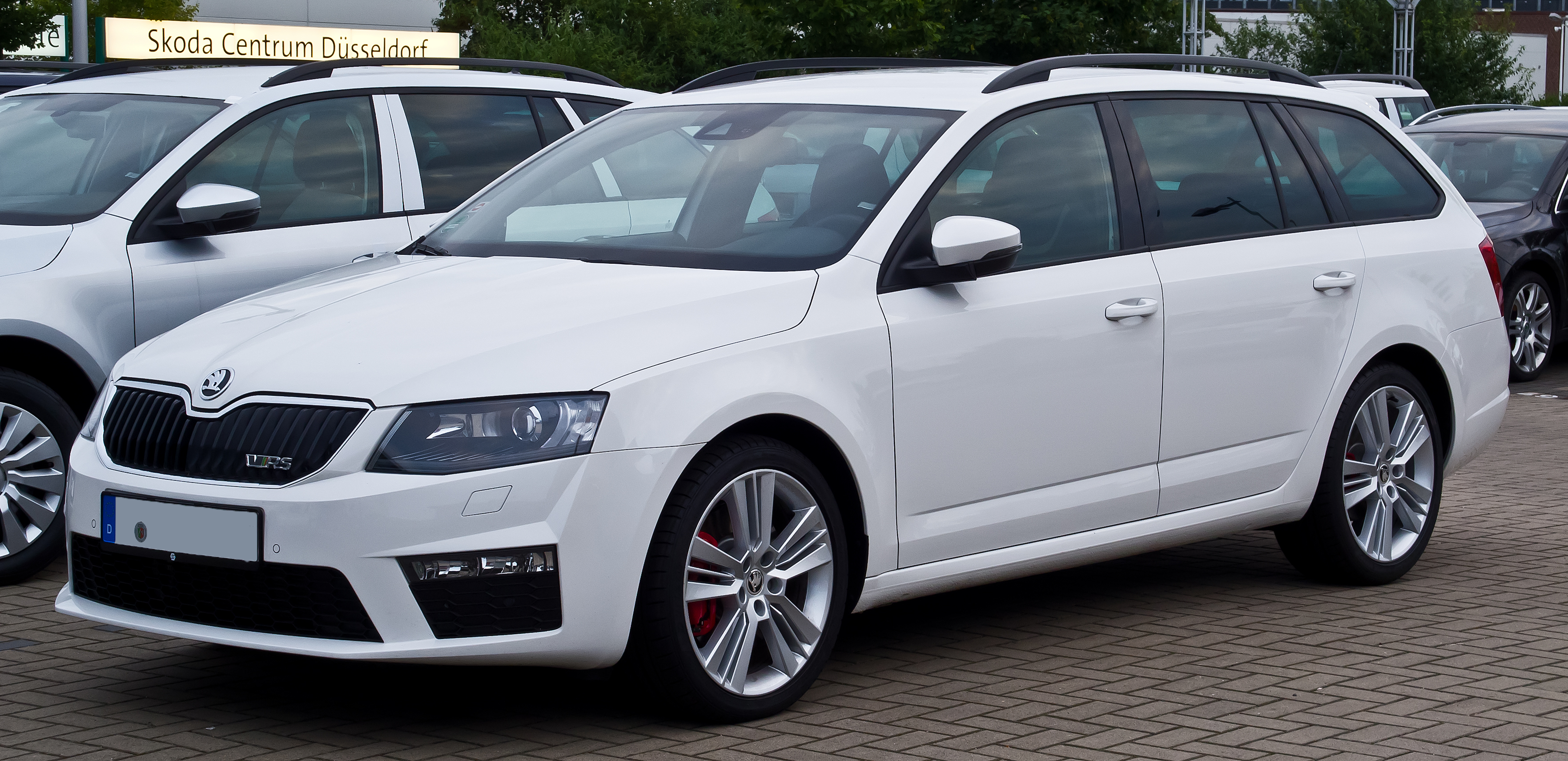

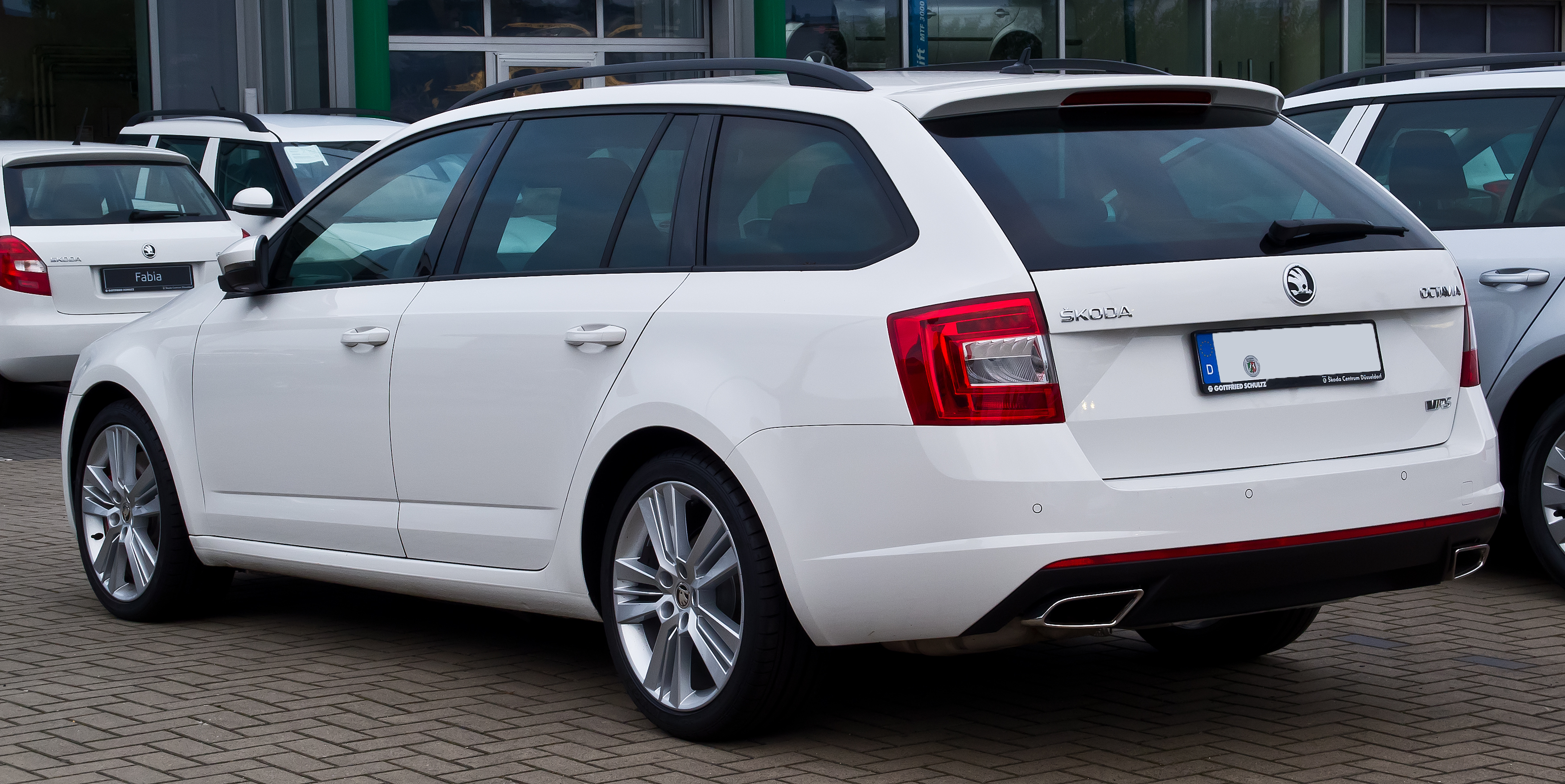
Octavia vRS (estate; pre-facelift)

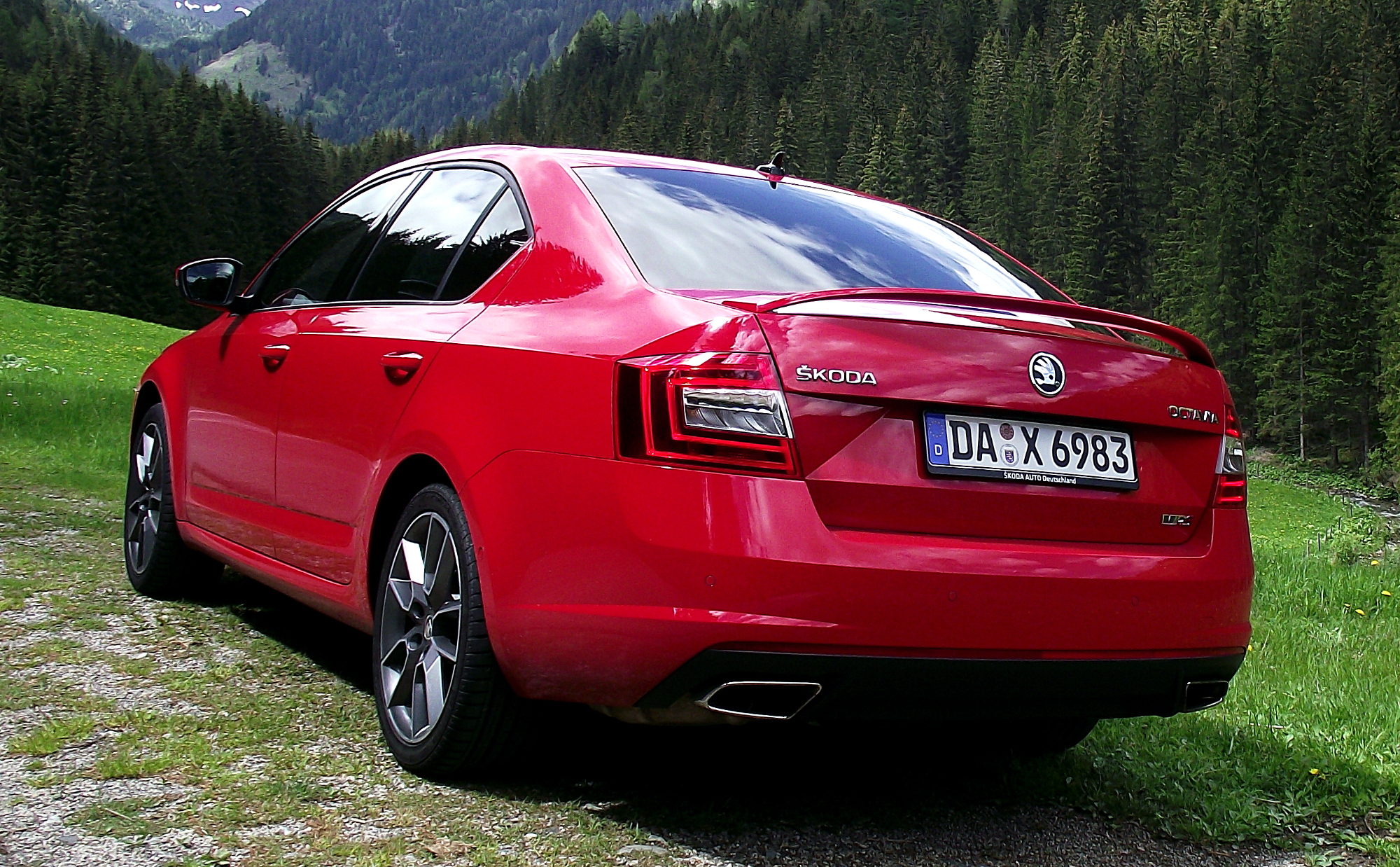
Octavia vRS (liftback; pre-facelift)

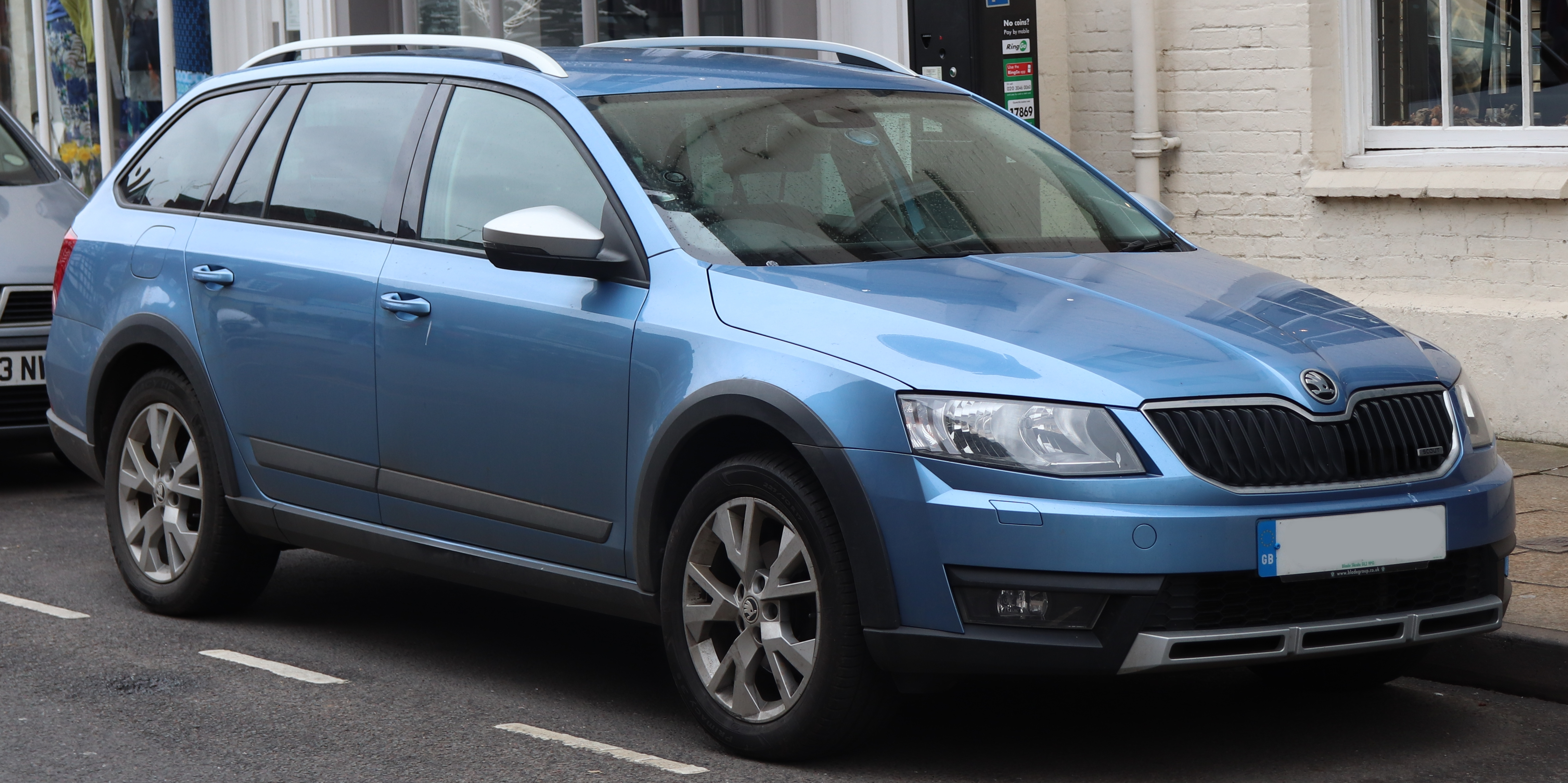

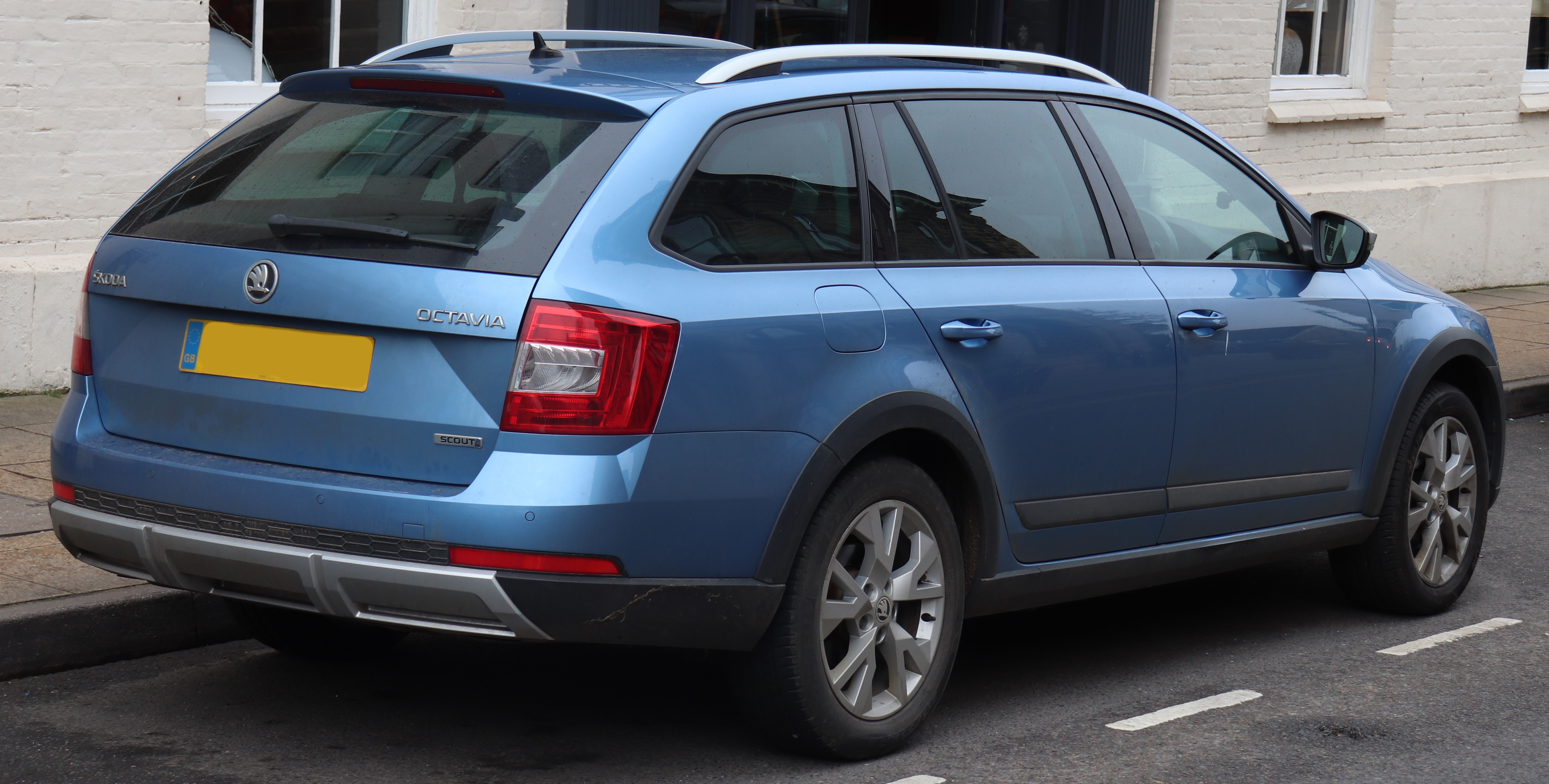
Octavia Scout (pre-facelift)

The car, designed by Jozef Kabaň, recalls the VisionD concept car presented in 2011. The new model is 9 cm (3.5 in) longer and 4.5 cm (1.8 in) wider than the second generation and the wheelbase lengthened by 8 cm (3.1 in). It is also up to 102 kg lighter than the previous model. The interior length of the third-generation Škoda Octavia has grown – in comparison to its predecessor – by 33 mm (1.3 in) to 1,782 mm (70.2 in), while the legroom for the backseat passengers grew by 47 to 73 mm (1.9 to 2.9 in). The headroom in the back was marginally increased as well. The elbow width was also increased, in the front by 39 mm (1.5 in) to 1,454 mm (57.2 in), and in the rear by 26 mm (1.0 in) to 1,499 mm (59.0 in). Similarly, the shoulder room was optimised. The luggage compartment volume is a class leading 590 L (20.84 cu ft), slightly more than the 585 L (20.66 cu ft) of the previous generation model or the 565 L (19.95 cu ft) of the larger Volkswagen Passat. From May 2013, Octavia customers wishing to carry more could opt for the Combi (estate) version with its 610 L (21.54 cu ft) luggage capacity.

The third-generation Octavia is the first Škoda car to feature front radar and a multifunction camera. The radar sensor in the front bumper monitors the area in front of the vehicle and continually evaluates the distance, direction, and speed of all nearby objects (not only traffic). This radar provides data for two assistants in the Octavia: Front Assistant (forward collision warning and emergency braking) and Adaptive Cruise Assistant (adaptive cruise control). A monochromatic fixed-focus multifunction camera is mounted on the windscreen in front of the rear mirror and allows the function of Lane Assistant (lane-keeping system), Intelligent Light Assistant (automatic control of the high beams), and Traffic Sign Recognition (recognises and shows traffic signs on displays of both on-board computer and satellite navigation). Added to this are assists, whose functionality is based on evaluating data provided by ESC or steering sensors: Crew Protect Assistant (proactive passenger protection), and Driver Activity Assistant (fatigue detection).

The Octavia features numerous so-called 'Simply Clever' details, i.e. an ice scraper inside the fuel filler flap, a rubbish bin inside the door panel, a parking ticket holder and a double-sided (rubber/textile) floor mat in the boot. A tilting/sliding panoramic sunroof is available as an option – a single-piece for the Octavia liftback and two-piece for the Octavia Combi. The Bolero, Amundsen, and Columbus car radios are protected against theft by the physical separation of the central display and the multimedia system's own central unit. The Octavia also offers a Phone Box, a storage compartment for a mobile phone with a planar antenna at the bottom of the compartment, which permits a so-called inductive exterior antenna connection.

For the front-wheel drive Octavia, engine outputs are offered of 63–132 kW (85–180 PS) on petrol cars and 66–110 kW (90–150 PS) for the diesel engines. The two environmentally friendly versions of the Octavia are: the GreenLine version with 1.6-litre diesel produces only 85 grams of CO_{2} per km; the G-TEC is fitted with 1.4-litre TSI engine running on CNG and emitting 97 grams of CO_{2} per km. The all-wheel-drive Octavia Combi can be powered by one petrol (1.8 TSI/132 kW) and three diesel engines (ranging from 77 to 135 kW). After the 2018 facelift and upgrade to available 2-litre petrol engines, transmissions were strengthened - the previous 1.8-litre models had shared the transmission with the 1.4 and 1.5 TSIs, thus being limited to 250 N⋅m (184 lb⋅ft) for front-wheel drive cars, 280 N⋅m (207 lb⋅ft) for four-wheel drive ones. The transmission now used on the two-litre cars was rated for 420 N⋅m (310 lb⋅ft).

The Octavia RS, available in both the liftback and estate body styles, was premiered at the Goodwood Festival of Speed 2013. It features the 162 kW (220 PS) 2.0 TSI engine from the newly launched Volkswagen Golf GTI and the 135 kW (184 PS) 2.0 TDI engine from the Volkswagen Golf GTD. With a top speed of 248 km/h (154 mph), the Octavia RS with petrol engine and manual gearbox was acclaimed to be the fastest production Octavia ever. In comparison with the standard car, the sports Octavia features progressive steering (variable-ratio steering), sports chassis, electronic differential lock (XDS), and so-called 'Performance Sound Generator' which enhances the sporty sound of the engine. The source of sound vibrations is the electromagnetic pulse generator placed in the area under/in front of the windshield. The sound vibrations are spreading into the car's cabin through the body and the windshield. The frequency and intensity of the sound are dependent not only on the profile chosen but also on the engine revolutions, driving speed, and engine load (the throttle pedal position). The generated sound is directed inside the cabin, especially to the front seat area. Škoda used the 2015 Geneva Motor Show to shine the spotlight on its new and more powerful Octavia RS 230. The car has 230 PS (10 PS more than stock) and this helps it shave a tenth off its benchmark sprint time and adds 2 km/h to the car's top speed which increases to 250 km/h (155 mph); it also gets a standard electronic differential in this version and lower, stiffer springs.

In early 2014, Škoda revealed the Scout; it has raised suspension, plastic cladding, and four-wheel drive.

In 2016, the Czech brand announced that one million units of the third generation Octavia had been produced.

In early 2017, the third-generation facelift Octavia arrived in the showrooms, with the main visible difference being the split front headlights looking like the pre-facelift Mercedes-Benz E-Class (W212).

=== Engines ===
Overview of engines available for the third-generation Octavia (A7, Typ 5E) with front-wheel drive, including the RS version.

Engine designation	Production	Engine code (family)	Displacement, configuration, valvetrain, fuel system, aspiration	Power at rpm	Max. torque at rpm	Gearbox (type), drive	Top speed (Liftback / Combi)	0–100 km/h [s] (0-62 mph) (Liftback / Combi)	Combined consumption [l/100 km / mpg imp / mpg US]	CO_{2} [g/km] (Liftback / Combi)
Petrol engines
1.2 TSI 63 kW	2013–2019	CJZB (EA211)	1197 cc, I4, 16V DOHC, turbocharged	63 kW (86 PS; 84 hp) at 4300-5300 rpm	160 N⋅m (118 lb⋅ft) at 1400-3500 rpm	5-speed manual	181 km/h (112 mph)	12.0	5.2 / 54.3 / 45.2	119
1.2 TSI 77 kW	2013–2019	CJZA (EA211)	1197 cc, I4, 16V DOHC, turbocharged	77 kW (105 PS; 103 hp) at 4500-5500 rpm	175 N⋅m (129 lb⋅ft) at 1400-4000 rpm	6-speed manual	196 km/h (122 mph)	10.3	4.9 / 57.6 / 48.0	114
1.2 TSI 77 kW	2013–2019	CJZA (EA211)	1197 cc, I4, 16V DOHC, turbocharged	77 kW (105 PS; 103 hp) at 4500-5500 rpm	175 N⋅m (129 lb⋅ft) at 1400-4000 rpm	5-speed manual	196 km/h (122 mph)	10.3	5.2 / 54.3 / 45.2	119
1.2 TSI 77 kW	2013–2019	CJZA (EA211)	1197 cc, I4, 16V DOHC, turbocharged	77 kW (105 PS; 103 hp) at 4500-5500 rpm	175 N⋅m (129 lb⋅ft) at 1400-4000 rpm	7-speed DSG	196 km/h (122 mph)	10.5	5.0 / 56.5 / 47.0	115
1.2 TSI 81 kW	2015–2017	CJZD (EA211)	1197 cc, I4, 16V DOHC, turbocharged	81 kW (110 PS; 109 hp) at 4600-5600 rpm	175 N⋅m (129 lb⋅ft) at 1400-4000 rpm	6-speed manual, FWD	196 km/h (122 mph); 193 km/h (120 mph)	10.3 / 10.5	Liftback: 4.9/ 57.7/ 48; Combi: 5.0/ 56.5/ 47	113 / 115
1.4 G-TEC 81 kW	2014–2023	CPWA (EA211)	1395 cc, I4, 16V DOHC, TSI bi-fuel, turbocharged	81 kW (110 PS; 109 hp) at 4800-6000 rpm	200 N⋅m (148 lb⋅ft) at 1500-3500 rpm	6-speed manual (MQ200), FWD	195 km/h (121 mph)	10.9	5.4* / 52.3 / 43.6	97
1.6 MPI 81 kW	2014–2023	CWVA (EA211)	1598 cc, I4, 16V DOHC, naturally aspirated	81 kW (110 PS; 109 hp) at 5500-5800 rpm	155 N⋅m (114 lb⋅ft) at 3800 rpm	5-speed manual (MQ200), FWD	192 km/h (119 mph)	10.6	6.4 / 44.1 / 36.7	149
1.6 MPI 81 kW	2014–2019	CWVA (EA211)	1598 cc, I4, 16V DOHC, naturally aspirated	81 kW (110 PS; 109 hp) at 5500-5800 rpm	155 N⋅m (114 lb⋅ft) at 3800 rpm	6-speed automatic (AQ160), FWD	190 km/h (118 mph)	12.0	6.7 / 42.2 / 35.1	155
1.0 TSI 85 kW	2015–2019	CHZD (EA211)	999 cc, I3, 12v DOHC, turbocharged	85 kW (116 PS; 114 hp) at 5000-5500 rpm	200 N⋅m (148 lb⋅ft) at 2000 rpm	6-speed manual (MQ250), FWD	202 km/h (126 mph)	10.1	4.2 / 67.3 / 56	110
1.0 TSI 85 kW	2015–2023	CHZD (EA211)	999 cc, I3, 12v DOHC, turbocharged	85 kW (116 PS; 114 hp) at 5000-5500 rpm	200 N⋅m (148 lb⋅ft) at 2000 rpm	7-speed DSG (DQ200), FWD	202 km/h (126 mph)	10.2	4.3 / 65.7 / 55	108
1.4 TSI 103 kW	2013–2019	CHPA (EA211)	1395 cc, I4, 16V DOHC, turbocharged	103 kW (140 PS; 138 hp) at 4500-6000 rpm	250 N⋅m (184 lb⋅ft) at 1500-3500 rpm	6-speed manual (MQ250), FWD	215 km/h (134 mph)	8.4	5.3 / 53.3 / 44.4	121
1.4 TSI 103 kW	2013–2019	CHPA (EA211)	1395 cc, I4, 16V DOHC, turbocharged	103 kW (140 PS; 138 hp) at 4500-6000 rpm	250 N⋅m (184 lb⋅ft) at 1500-3500 rpm	7-speed DSG (DQ200), FWD	215 km/h (134 mph)	8.5	5.0 / 56.5 / 47.0	116
1.4 TSI 110 kW	2013–2019	CZDA (EA211)	1395 cc, I4, 16V DOHC, turbocharged	110 kW (150 PS; 148 hp) at 5000-6000 rpm	250 N⋅m (184 lb⋅ft) at 1400-3800 rpm	6-speed manual (MQ250), FWD	215 km/h (134 mph)	8.4	5.2 / 54.3 / 45.2	120
1.5 TSI 110 kW	2018–2019	DADA (EA211 EVO)	1498 cc, I4, 16V DOHC, turbocharged	110 kW (150 PS; 148 hp) at 5000 rpm	250 N⋅m (184 lb⋅ft) at 1500-3500 rpm	6-speed manual, FWD	219 km/h (136 mph)	8.3	5.1 / 55.4 / 46.1	116
1.8 TSI 132 kW	2013–2019	CJSA (EA888-Gen3)	1798 cc, I4, 16V DOHC, TSI, turbocharged	132 kW (180 PS; 178 hp) at 5100-6200 rpm	250 N⋅m (184 lb⋅ft) at 1250-5000 rpm	6-speed manual (MQ250), FWD	231 km/h (144 mph)	7.3	6.1 / 46.3 / 38.6	141
1.8 TSI 132 kW	2013–2019	CJSA (EA888-Gen3)	1798 cc, I4, 16V DOHC, TSI, turbocharged	132 kW (180 PS; 178 hp) at 5100-6200 rpm	250 N⋅m (184 lb⋅ft) at 1250-5000 rpm	7-speed DSG (DQ200), FWD, FWD	231 km/h (144 mph)	7.4	5.7 / 49.6 / 41.3	131
2.0 TSI 140 kW	2018-2020	DKZA (EA888-Gen3)	1984 cc, I4, 16V DOHC, TSI, turbocharged	140 kW (190 PS; 188 hp) at 4200-6000 rpm	320 N⋅m (236 lb⋅ft)	7-speed DSG (DQ381), FWD	230 km/h (143 mph)	7.3 / 7.4	6.1 / 46.3 / 38.6	139
2.0 TSI RS 162 kW (RS 220)	2013–2019	CHHB (EA888-Gen3)	1984 cc, I4, 16V DOHC, TSI, turbocharged	162 kW (220 PS; 217 hp) at 4500-6200 rpm	350 N⋅m (258 lb⋅ft) at 1550-4400 rpm	6-speed manual (MQ350), FWD	248 km/h (154 mph)	6.8	6.2 / 45.6 / 37.9	142
2.0 TSI RS 162 kW (RS 220)	2013–2019	CHHB (EA888-Gen3)	1984 cc, I4, 16V DOHC, TSI, turbocharged	162 kW (220 PS; 217 hp) at 4500-6200 rpm	350 N⋅m (258 lb⋅ft) at 1550-4400 rpm	6-speed DSG (DQ250), FWD	245 km/h (152 mph)	6.9	6.4 / 44.1 / 36.7	149
2.0 TSI RS 169 kW (RS 230)	2015–2023	CHHA (EA888-Gen3)	1984 cc, I4, 16V DOHC, TSI, turbocharged	169 kW (230 PS; 227 hp) at 4700–6230 rpm	350 N⋅m (258 lb⋅ft) at 1500–4600 rpm	6-speed manual (MQ350), FWD	250 km/h (155 mph); 247 km/h (153 mph)	6.7	6.2 / 45.6 / 37.9	142
2.0 TSI RS 169 kW (RS 230)	2015–2019	CHHA (EA888-Gen3)	1984 cc, I4, 16V DOHC, TSI, turbocharged	169 kW (230 PS; 227 hp) at 4700–6230 rpm	350 N⋅m (258 lb⋅ft) at 1500–4600 rpm	6-speed DSG (DQ250), FWD	249 km/h (155 mph); 245 km/h (152 mph)	6.8	6.4 / 44.1 / 36.7	149
2.0 TSI RS 180 kW (RS 245)	2017–2023	DLBA (EA888-Gen3)	1984 cc, I4, 16V DOHC, TSI, turbocharged	180 kW (245 PS; 241 hp) at 4,700-6,200 rpm	370 N⋅m (273 lb⋅ft) at 1,600–4,300 rpm	6-speed manual (MQ350), FWD	all: 250 km/h (155 mph)	6.6 / 6.7	6.6 / 42.8 / 35.64	150
2.0 TSI RS 180 kW (RS 245)	2017–2019	DLBA (EA888-Gen3)	1984 cc, I4, 16V DOHC, TSI, turbocharged	180 kW (245 PS; 241 hp) at 4,700-6,200 rpm	370 N⋅m (273 lb⋅ft) at 1,600–4,300 rpm	6-speed DSG (DQ250), FWD	all: 250 km/h (155 mph)	6.6 / 6.7	6.4 / 44.1 / 36.7	146
2.0 TSI RS 180 kW (RS 245)	2017–2019	DLBA (EA888-Gen3)	1984 cc, I4, 16V DOHC, TSI, turbocharged	180 kW (245 PS; 241 hp) at 4,700-6,200 rpm	370 N⋅m (273 lb⋅ft) at 1,600–4,300 rpm	7-speed DSG (DQ381), FWD	all: 250 km/h (155 mph)	6.6 / 6.7	6.4 / 44.1 / 36.7	146
Diesel engines
1.6 TDI CR DPF 66 kW	2013–2019	CLHB (EA288)	1598 cc, I4, 16V DOHC, common-rail, turbocharged	66 kW (90 PS; 89 hp) at 2750-4800 rpm	230 N⋅m (170 lb⋅ft) at 1400-2700 rpm	5-speed manual (MQ250), FWD	186 km/h (116 mph)	12.2	4.1 / 68.9 / 57.4	109
1.6 TDI CR DPF 77 kW	2012–2019	CLHA (EA288)	1598 cc, I4, 16V DOHC, common-rail, turbocharged	77 kW (105 PS; 103 hp) at 3000-4000 rpm	250 N⋅m (184 lb⋅ft) at 1500-2750 rpm	5-speed manual (MQ250), FWD	194 km/h (121 mph)	10.8	3.8 / 74.3 / 61.9	99
1.6 TDI CR DPF 77 kW	2013–2019	CLHA (EA288)	1598 cc, I4, 16V DOHC, common-rail, turbocharged	77 kW (105 PS; 103 hp) at 3000-4000 rpm	250 N⋅m (184 lb⋅ft) at 1500-2750 rpm	7-speed DSG (DQ200), FWD	194 km/h (121 mph)	10.9	3.9 / 72.4 / 60.3	102
1.6 TDI CR DPF 81 kW GreenLine	2013–2019	CXXB (EA288)	1598 cc, I4, 16V DOHC, common-rail, turbocharged	81 kW (110 PS; 109 hp) at 3250-4000 rpm	250 N⋅m (184 lb⋅ft) at 1500-3000 rpm	6-speed manual (MQ250), FWD	206 km/h (128 mph)	10.6	3.2 / 88.3 / 73.5	85
2.0 TDI CR DPF 105 kW	2013–2019	CRVC (EA288)	1968 cc, I4, 16V DOHC, common-rail, turbocharged	105 kW (143 PS; 141 hp) at 3500-4000 rpm	320 N⋅m (236 lb⋅ft) at 1750-3000 rpm	6-speed manual (MQ350), FWD	215 km/h (134 mph)	8.7	4.6 / 61.4 / 51.1	121
2.0 TDI CR DPF 105 kW	2013–2019	CRVC (EA288)	1968 cc, I4, 16V DOHC, common-rail, turbocharged	105 kW (143 PS; 141 hp) at 3500-4000 rpm	320 N⋅m (236 lb⋅ft) at 1750-3000 rpm	6-speed DSG (DQ250), FWD	212 km/h (132 mph)	8.9	5.1 / 55.4 / 46.1	133
2.0 TDI CR DPF 110 kW	2013–2019	CKFC (EA288)	1968 cc, I4, 16V DOHC, common-rail, turbocharged	110 kW (150 PS; 148 hp) at 3500-4000 rpm	320 N⋅m (236 lb⋅ft) at 1750-3000 rpm	PFL STOP / START 6-speed manual (MQ350), FWD	218 km/h (135 mph)	8.5	4.5 / 62.8 / 52.3	116
2.0 TDI CR DPF 110 kW	2012–2019	CKFC (EA288)	1968 cc, I4, 16V DOHC, common-rail, turbocharged	110 kW (150 PS; 148 hp) at 3500-4000 rpm	320 N⋅m (236 lb⋅ft) at 1750-3000 rpm	6-speed DSG (DQ250), FWD	215 km/h (134 mph)	8.6	4.5 / 62.8 / 52.3	119
2.0 TDI CR DPF 135 kW	2013–2019	CUPA (EA288)	1968 cc, I4, 16V DOHC, common-rail, turbocharged	135 kW (184 PS; 181 hp) at 3500-4000 rpm	380 N⋅m (280 lb⋅ft) at 1750-3000 rpm	6-speed manual (MQ350), FWD	232 km/h (144 mph)	8.1	4.6 / 61.4 / 51.1	119
2.0 TDI CR DPF 135 kW	2013–2019	CUPA (EA288)	1968 cc, I4, 16V DOHC, common-rail, turbocharged	135 kW (184 PS; 181 hp) at 3500-4000 rpm	6-speed DSG (DQ250), FWD	230 km/h (143 mph)	8.2	5.0 / 56.5 / 47.0	129	

(*)CNG consumption in m3/100 km. Consumption of 1 m3 of CNG is adequate to 1 L of petrol.

Overview of engines available for the 3rd-generation Octavia Combi 4×4 (A7, Typ 5E) with all-wheel drive, incl. the Scout version.

Engine designation	Production	Engine code (family)	Displacement, configuration, valvetrain, fuel system, aspiration	Power at rpm	Max. torque at rpm	Gearbox (type), drive	Top speed	0–100 km/h [s] (0-62 mph)	Combined consumption [l/100 km / mpg imp / mpg US]	CO_{2} [g/km]
Petrol engines
1.8 TSI 132 kW	2013–2019	CSJB (EA888-Gen3)	1798 cc, I4, 16V DOHC, TSI, turbocharged	132 kW (180 PS; 178 hp) at 4500-6200 rpm	280 Nm (207 lb•ft) at 1350-4500 rpm	6-speed DSG (DQ250), AWD	227 km/h (141 mph)	7.5	6.7 / 42.2 / 35.1	154
Diesel engines
1.6 TDI CR DPF 77 KW	2013–2019	CLHA (EA288)	1598 cc, I4, 16V, DOHC common-rail, turbocharged	77 kW (105 PS; 103 hp) at 3000-4000 rpm	250 Nm (184 lb•ft) at 1500-2750 rpm	6-speed manual (MQ350), AWD	188 km/h (117 mph)	11.7	4.5 / 62.8 / 52.3	119
2.0 TDI CR DPF 110 kW	2013–2019	CKFC (EA288)	1968 cc, I4, 16V DOHC, common-rail, turbocharged	110 kW (150 PS; 148 hp) at 3500-4000 rpm	320 Nm (236 lb•ft) at 1750-3000 rpm	6-speed manual (MQ350), AWD	213 km/h (132 mph)	8.7	4.9 / 57.6 / 48.0	124
2.0 TDI CR DPF 135 kW	2014–2023	CUNA (EA288)	1968 cc, I4, 16V DOHC, common-rail, turbocharged	135 kW (184 PS; 181 hp) at 3500-4000 rpm	380 Nm (280 lb•ft) at 1750-3250 rpm	6-speed DSG (DQ250), AWD	226 km/h (140 mph)	7.2	4.9 / 57.6 / 48.0	129

=== Facelift ===
On 10 January 2017 in Vienna, Škoda presented the third-generation Octavia facelift. The main changes brought mainly split front headlights, a solid centre section between the front grille, and a new system for predictive pedestrian protection. Plastic (exterior) side door mouldings were absent on the facelift Scout model. The first cars were delivered to customers before spring. The Chinese version leaked in March 2017 and a totally different taillight design and similar to its bigger counterpart, Škoda Superb.

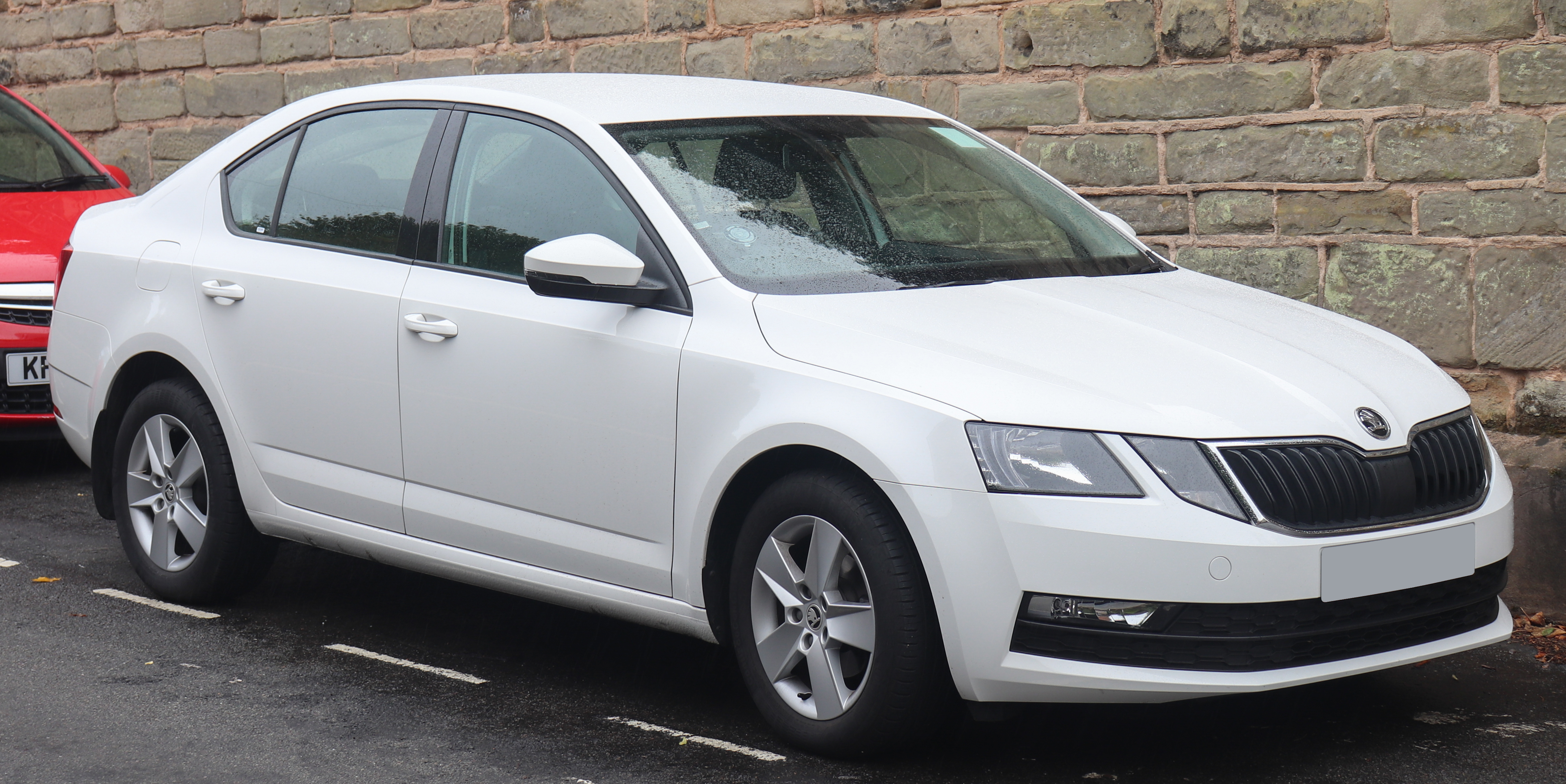
2017 facelift (front view, liftback)

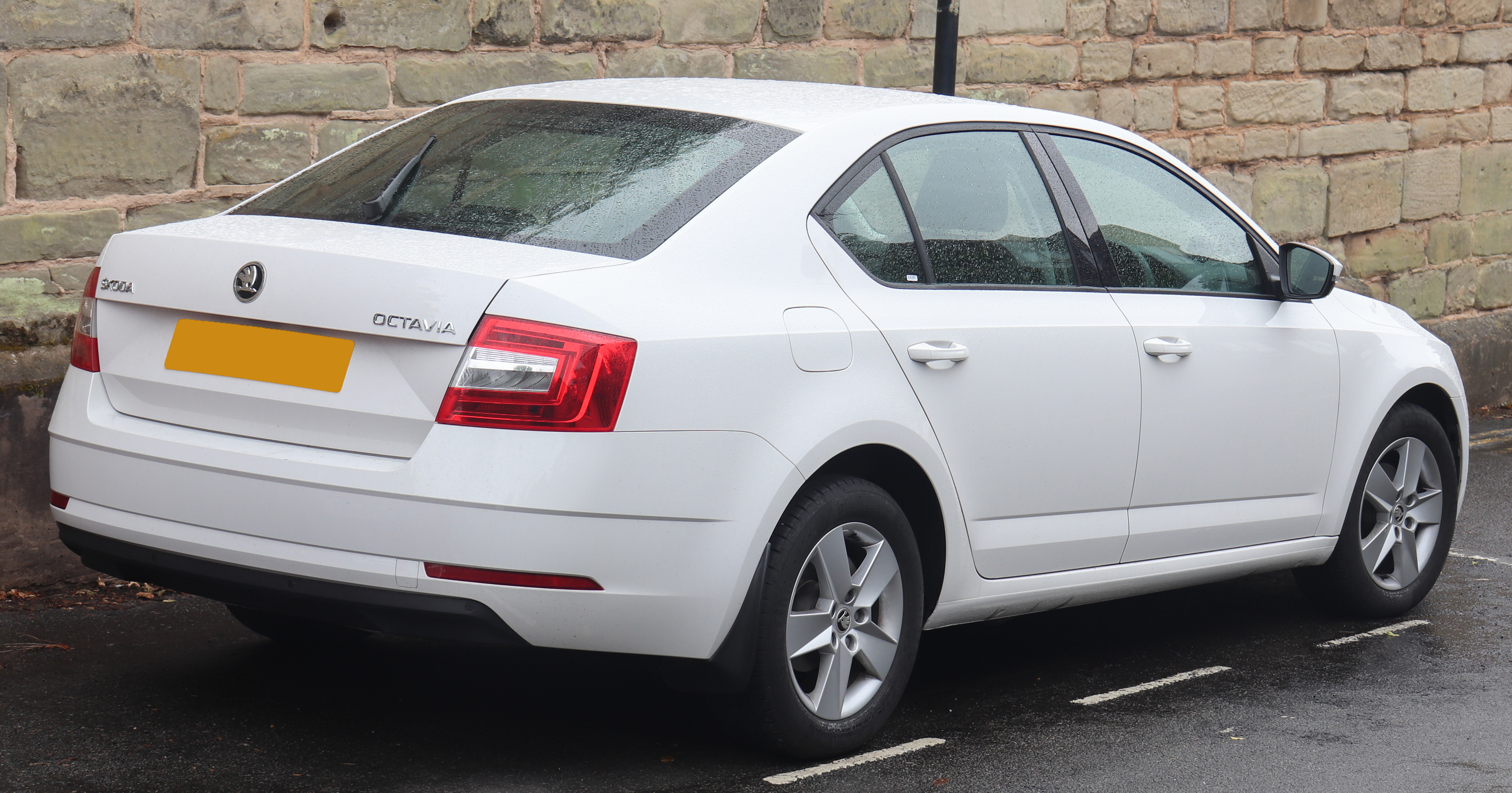
2017 facelift (rear view, liftback)

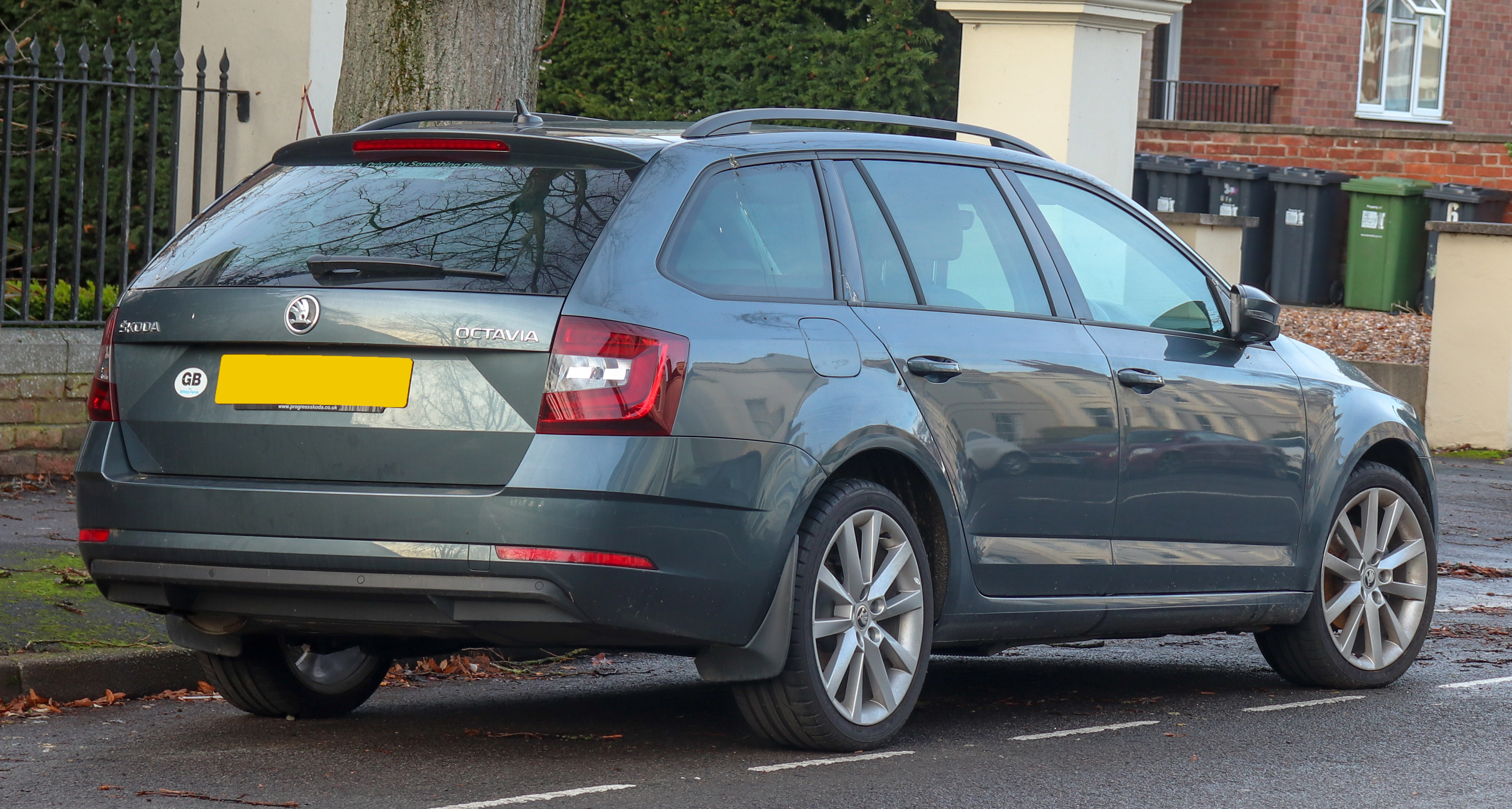
2017 facelift (rear view, estate)

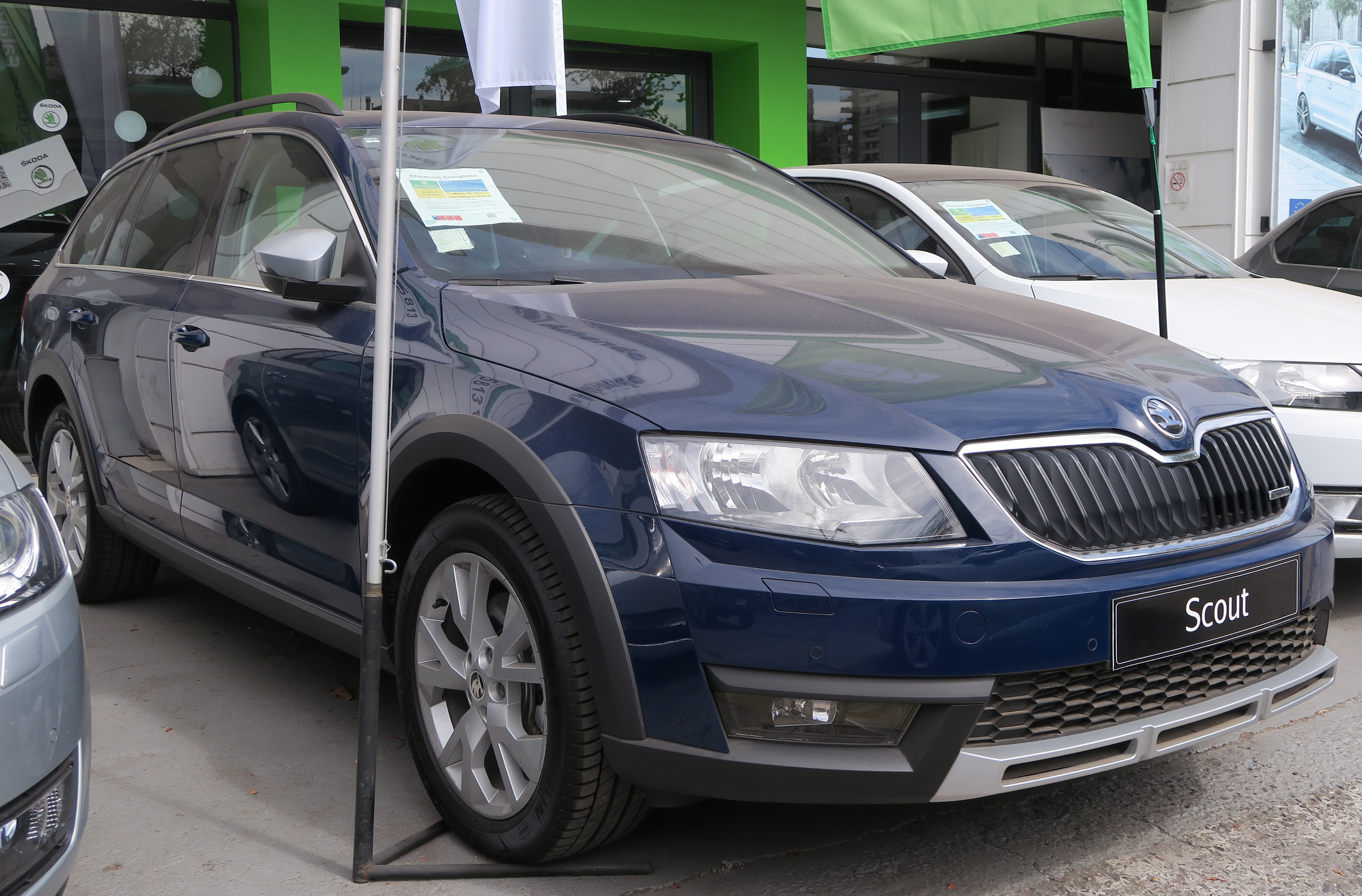
2017 facelift (front view, Scout)

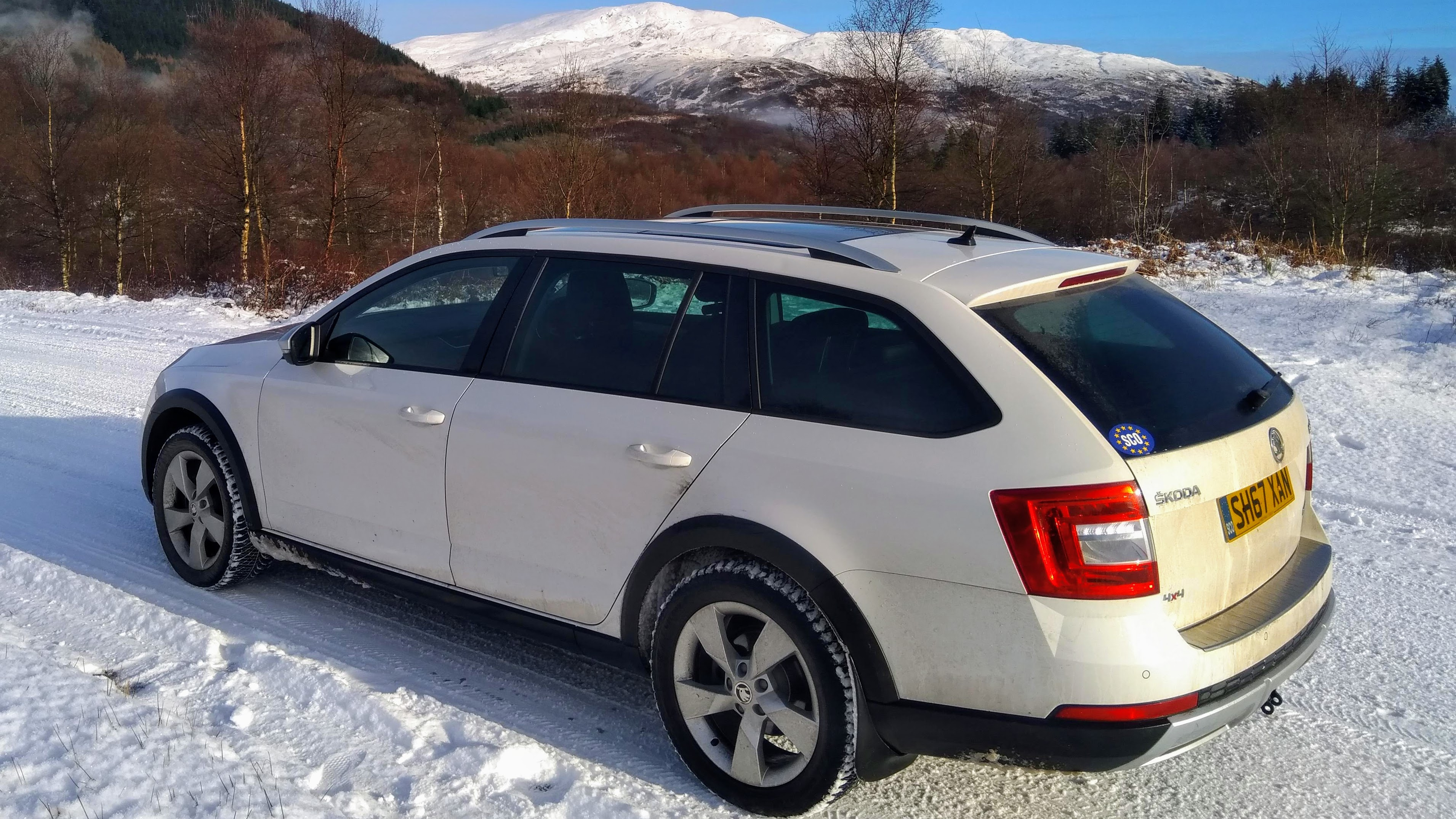
2017 facelift (rear view, Scout)

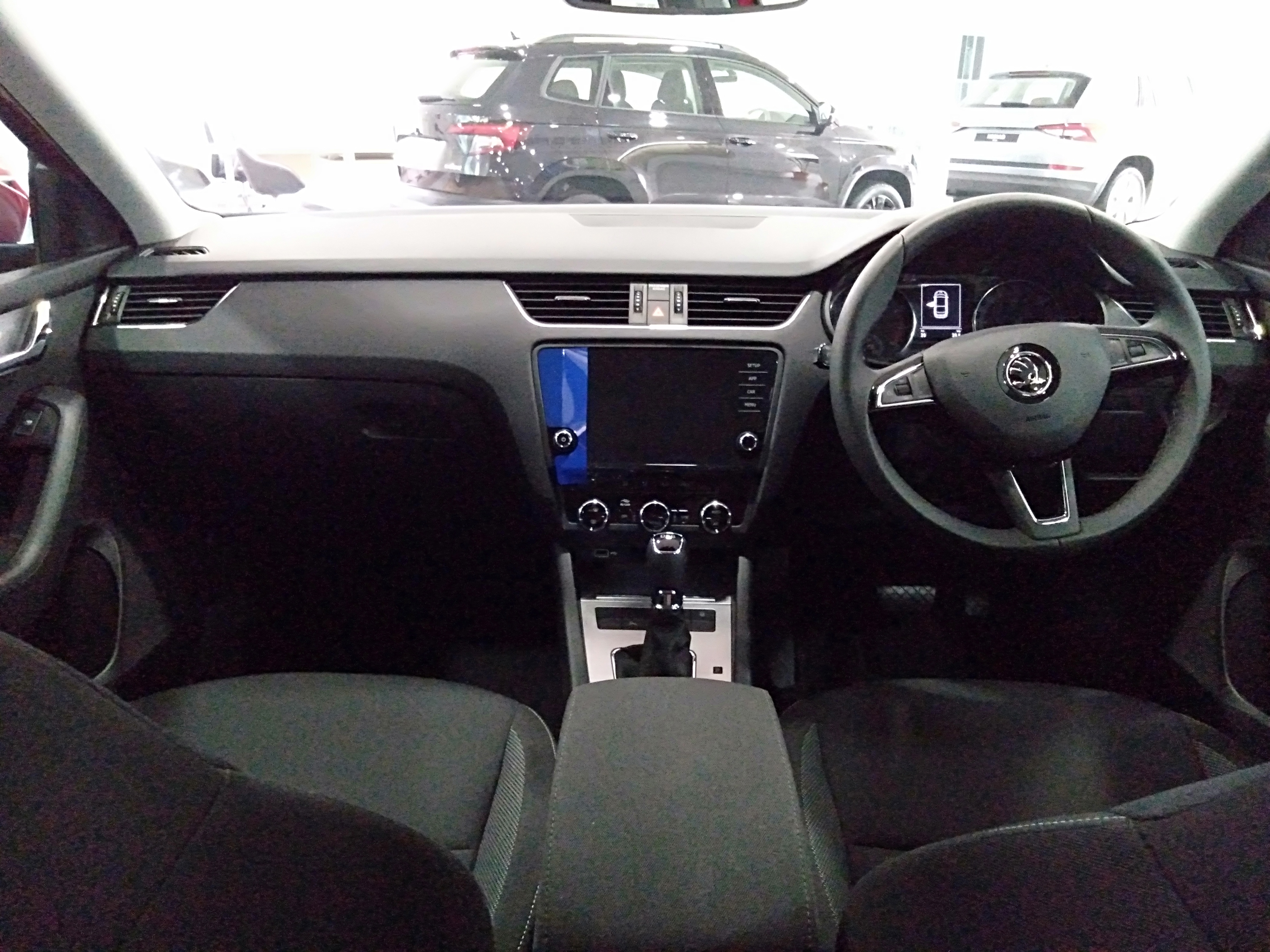
Interior (facelift, liftback)

=== Safety ===
Euro NCAP test results Škoda Octavia 1.6 Ambition (LHD) (2013)
Test	Points	%
Overall:	5 /5 stars	
Adult occupant:	33.6	93%
Child occupant:	42.4	86%
Pedestrian:	24.1	66%
Safety assist:	6	66%

ANCAP test results Skoda Octavia all front-wheel-drive variants (2013)
Test	Score
Overall	5 /5 stars
Frontal offset	15.87/16
Side impact	16/16
Pole	2/2
Seat belt reminders	2/3
Whiplash protection	Good
Pedestrian protection	Adequate
Electronic stability control	Standard

ANCAP test results Skoda Octavia all front-wheel-drive variants (2016)
Test	Score
Overall	5 /5 stars
Frontal offset	15.87/16
Side impact	15.96/16
Pole	2/2
Seat belt reminders	3/3
Whiplash protection	Good
Pedestrian protection	Adequate
Electronic stability control	Standard

== Fourth generation (Typ NX; 2020) ==
Škoda Octavia Mk4
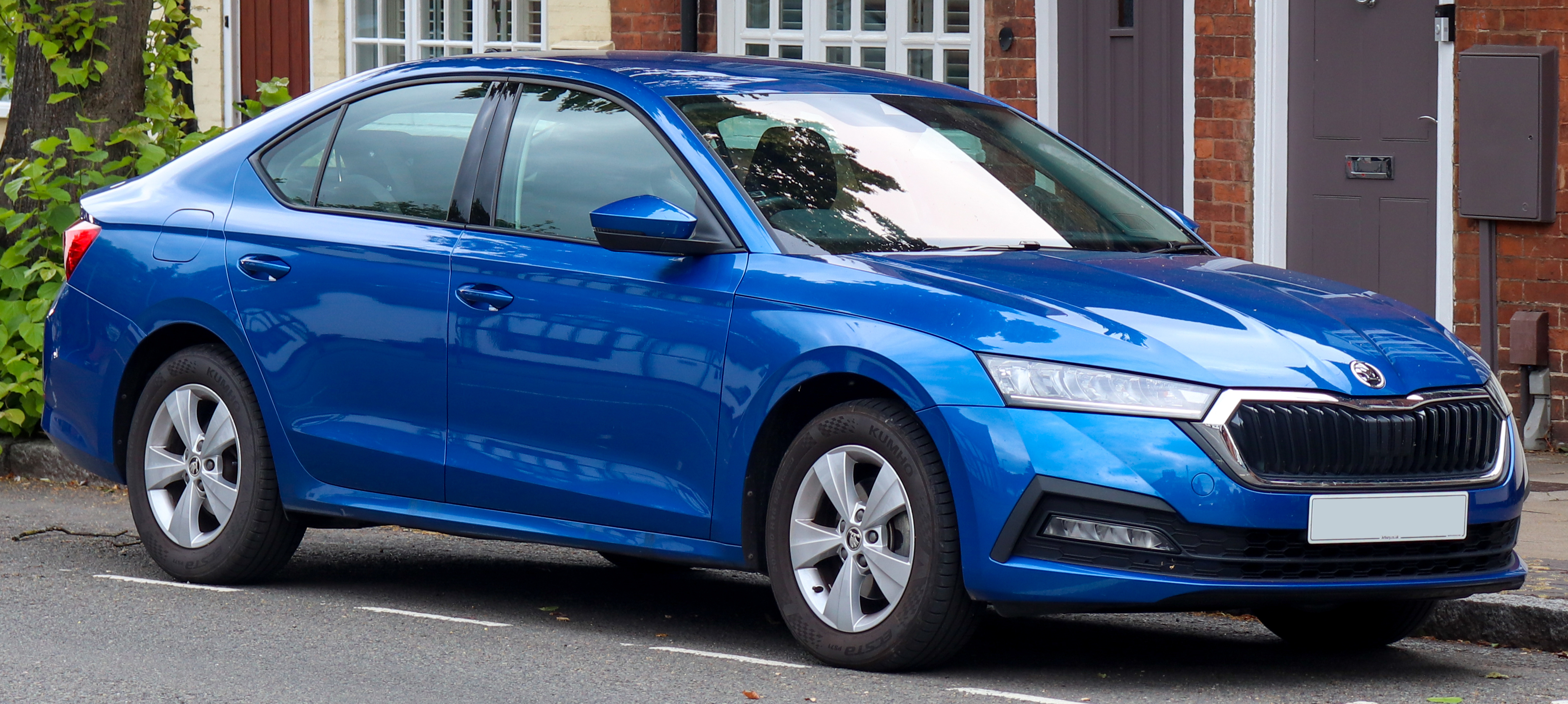

Overview
- Model code: NX
- Also called: Škoda Octavia Pro (China)
- Production: November 2019 – present (Global); 2021–2026 (China)
- Assembly: Czech Republic: Mladá Boleslav; Russia: Nizhny Novgorod (GAZ); China: Ningbo (SAIC-VW); India: Aurangabad (Škoda Auto-VW) (2021–2023); Kazakhstan: Kostanay(Allur, “Prague Auto")

Body and chassis
- Body style: 5-door liftback 5-door estate
- Platform: Volkswagen Group MQB Evo
- Related: Audi A3; SEAT León; Cupra Formentor; Volkswagen Golf Mk8

Powertrain
- Engine: Petrol: 1.0 L TSI 110 I3; 1.4 L TSI 150 I4; 1.5 L TSI 150 I4; 1.6 L MPI 110 I4; 2.0 L TSI 190 I4; 2.0 L TSI 250 I4; Petrol CNG: 1.5 L TGI 130 I4; Petrol PHEV: 1.4 L DGEA TSI turbo I4+electric motor, 150 kW (204 PS; 201 hp) (iV); 1.4 L DGEA TSI turbo I4+electric motor, 180 kW (245 PS; 241 hp) (RS iV); Petrol mild hybrid: 1.0 L TSI 110 I3; 1.5 L TSI 150 I4; Petrol hybrid: 1.5 L TSI I4 96 or 110 kW (131 or 150 PS; 129 or 148 hp); Diesel: 2.0 L TDI 115 I4; 2.0 L TDI 150 I4; 2.0 L TDI 200 I4
- Electric motor: 85 kW (116 PS; 114 hp) Permanent magnet AC synchronous motor (iV / RS iV); 125 kW (170 PS; 168 hp) Permanent magnet AC synchronous motor
- Power output: Petrol; 81–180 kW (110–245 PS; 109–241 hp); CNG; 96 kW (131 PS; 129 hp); MHEV; 110 kW (150 PS; 150 hp); FHEV (Since 2026); 100–125 kW (136–170 PS; 134–168 hp); PHEV; 150–180 kW (200–240 PS; 200–240 hp); Diesel; 85–147 kW (116–200 PS; 114–197 hp)
- Transmission: 6-speed manual transmission 6-speed automatic transmission 6/7-speed dual-clutch automatic DSG; 8-speed automatic Aisin AWF8F35/45; Single-speed TQ250 Transmission
- Hybrid drivetrain: MHEV (1.0 eTSI 110) (1.5 eTSI 150); Power-split hybrid (Octavia Hybrid); PHEV (Octavia iV PHEV)
- Battery: 1.6 kWh NMC (Octavia Hybrid); 13 kWh Li-ion (Octavia iV PHEV)

Dimensions
- Wheelbase: 2,669 mm (105.1 in); 2,730 mm (107.5 in) (Octavia Pro)
- Length: 4,689 mm (184.6 in); 4,753 mm (187.1 in) (Octavia Pro)
- Width: 1,829 mm (72.0 in); 1,788 mm (70.4 in) (Octavia Pro)
- Height: 1,470 mm (57.9 in) (liftback); 1,469 mm (57.8 in) (Octavia Pro); 1,468 mm (57.8 in) (estate)
- Kerb weight: 1,226–1,590 kg (2,703–3,505 lb)

Chronology
- Predecessor: Škoda Octavia Mk3; Škoda Rapid (NH3)

The fourth-generation Octavia was revealed in Prague on 11 November 2019. It was scheduled to be delivered to customers starting from June 2020.

The fourth generation Octavia features many new technologies. It is the first Škoda model to use a head-up display. Other new technologies include two 10" displays, wireless smartphone charging, up to 5 USB-C ports, a new Sound System by Canton, and the classic shifting stick for the automatic gearbox has been replaced with a small joystick. New safety features include taking control of steering in case of a possible accident, checking for oncoming vehicles when opening doors, and detection of the driver falling asleep or losing consciousness.

Since June 2020, the Octavia is sold as an estate and liftback with standard petrol and diesel engines. As well as a plug-in hybrid Octavia iV estate and liftback sport Octavia RS estate and liftback, CNG/petrol Octavia G-Tec estate and liftback.

The liftback version was also sold in China since 2021 as the Octavia Pro and sold alongside the third-generation models. Design wise, the Octavia Pro features an identical exterior design with the Octavia RS. It is longer compared to its European counterpart by 64 mm (2.5 in) with a 44 mm (1.7 in) longer wheelbase.

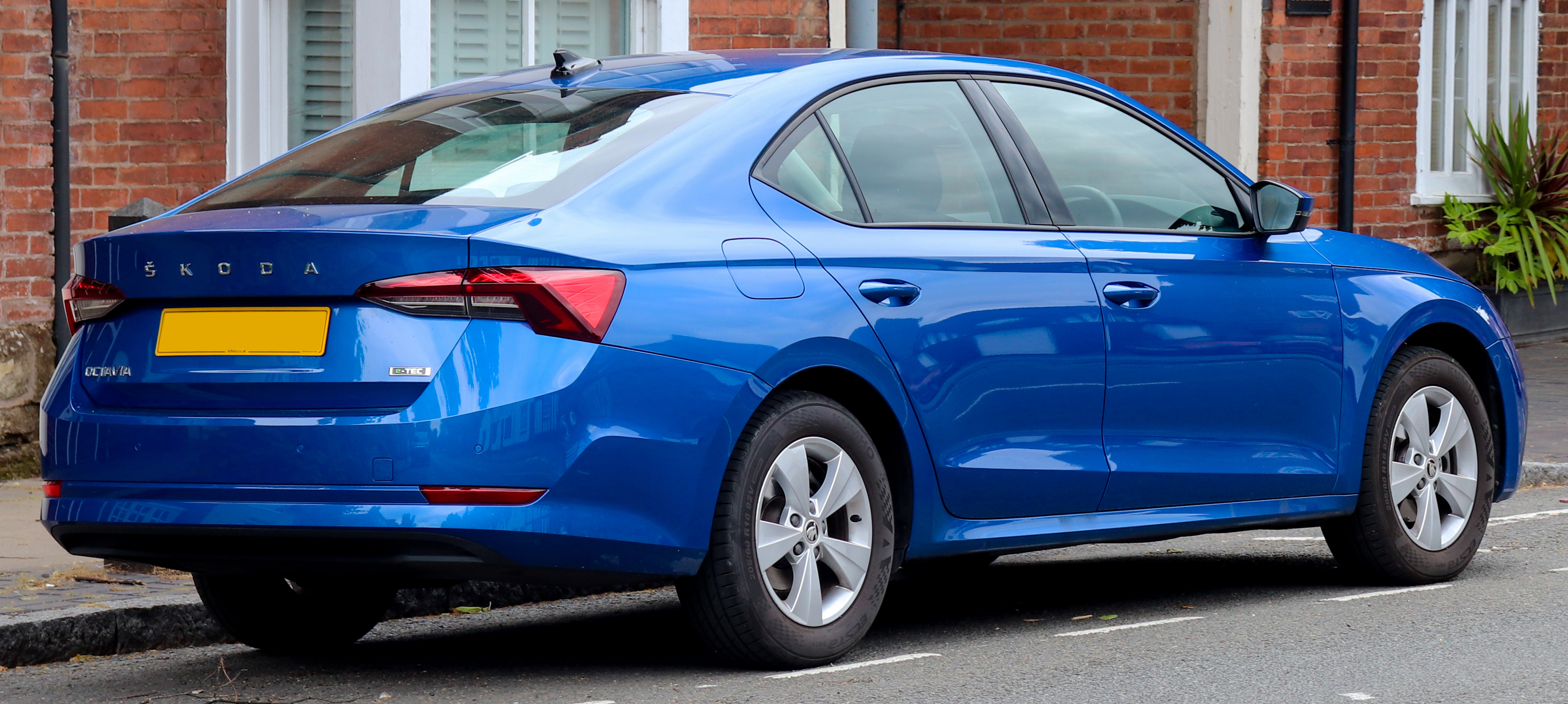
Liftback (pre-facelift)

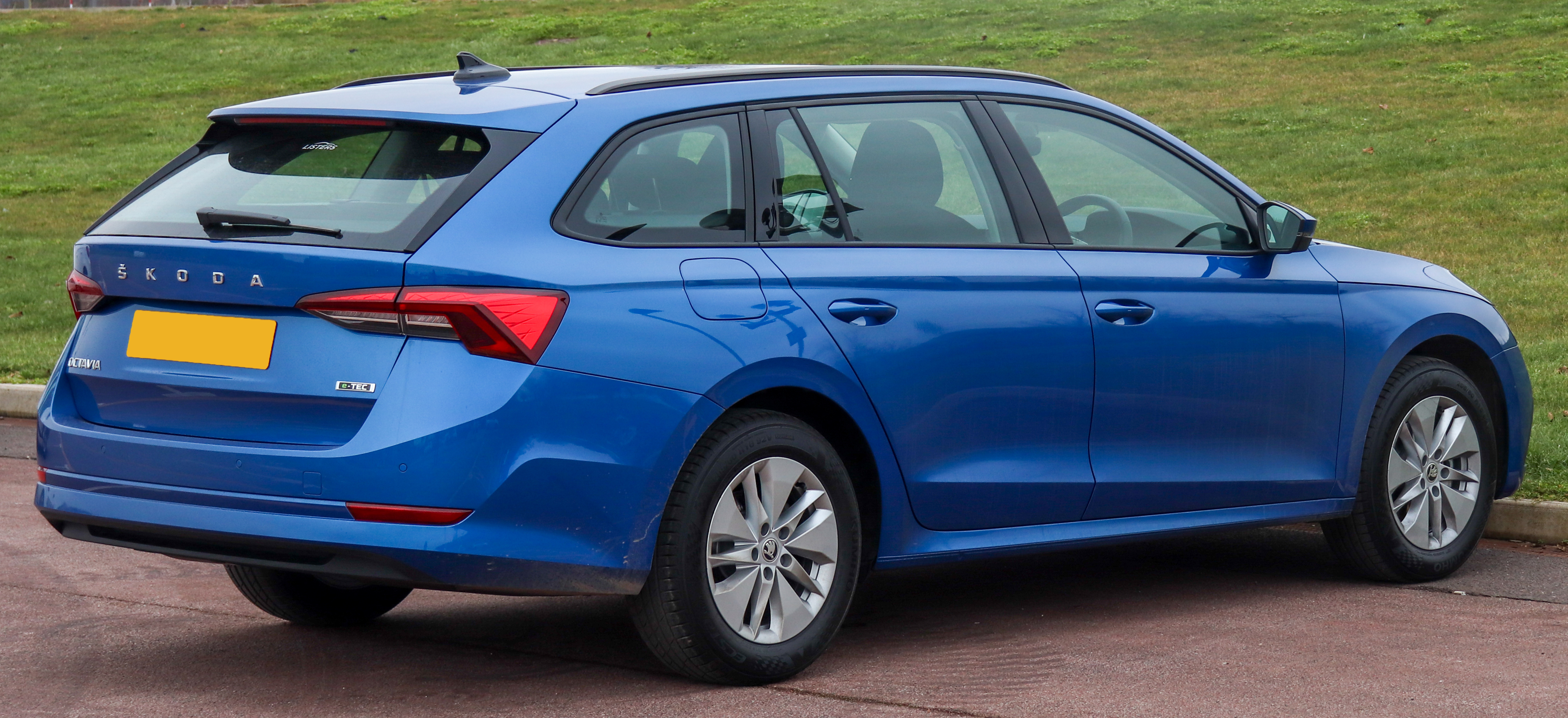
Combi/Estate (pre-facelift)

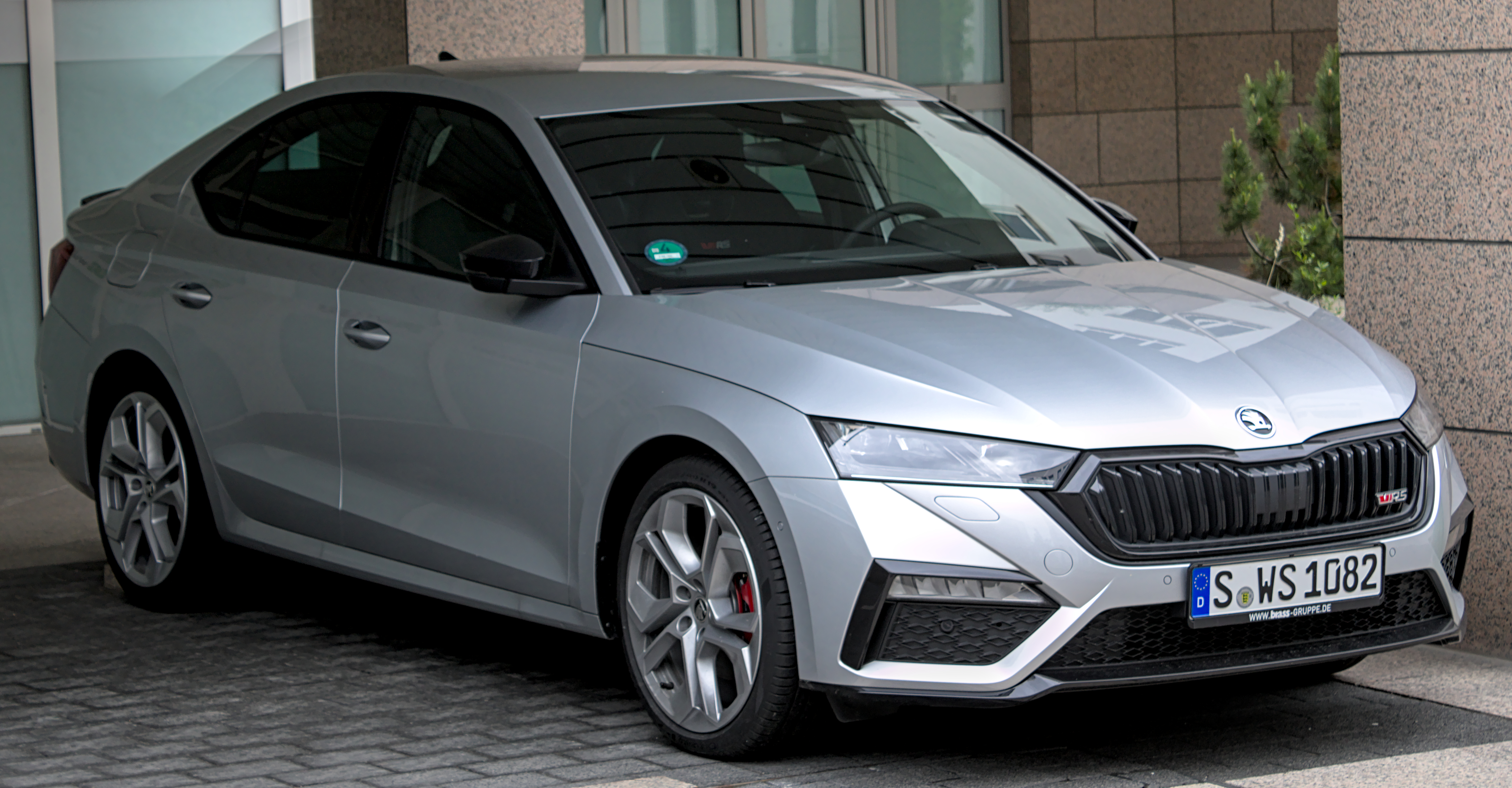
Octavia RS (liftback; pre-facelift)

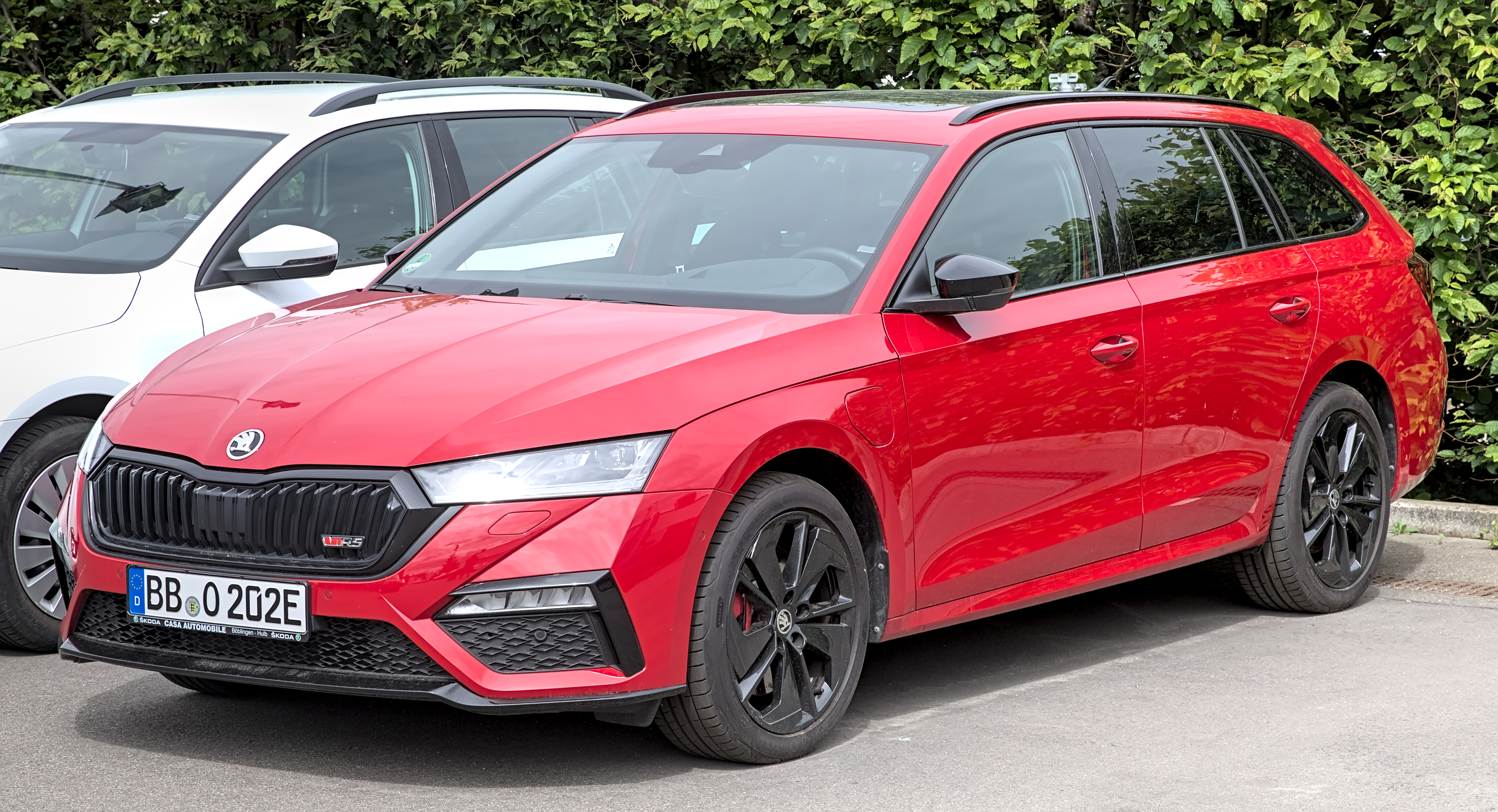
Octavia RS (Combi; pre-facelift)

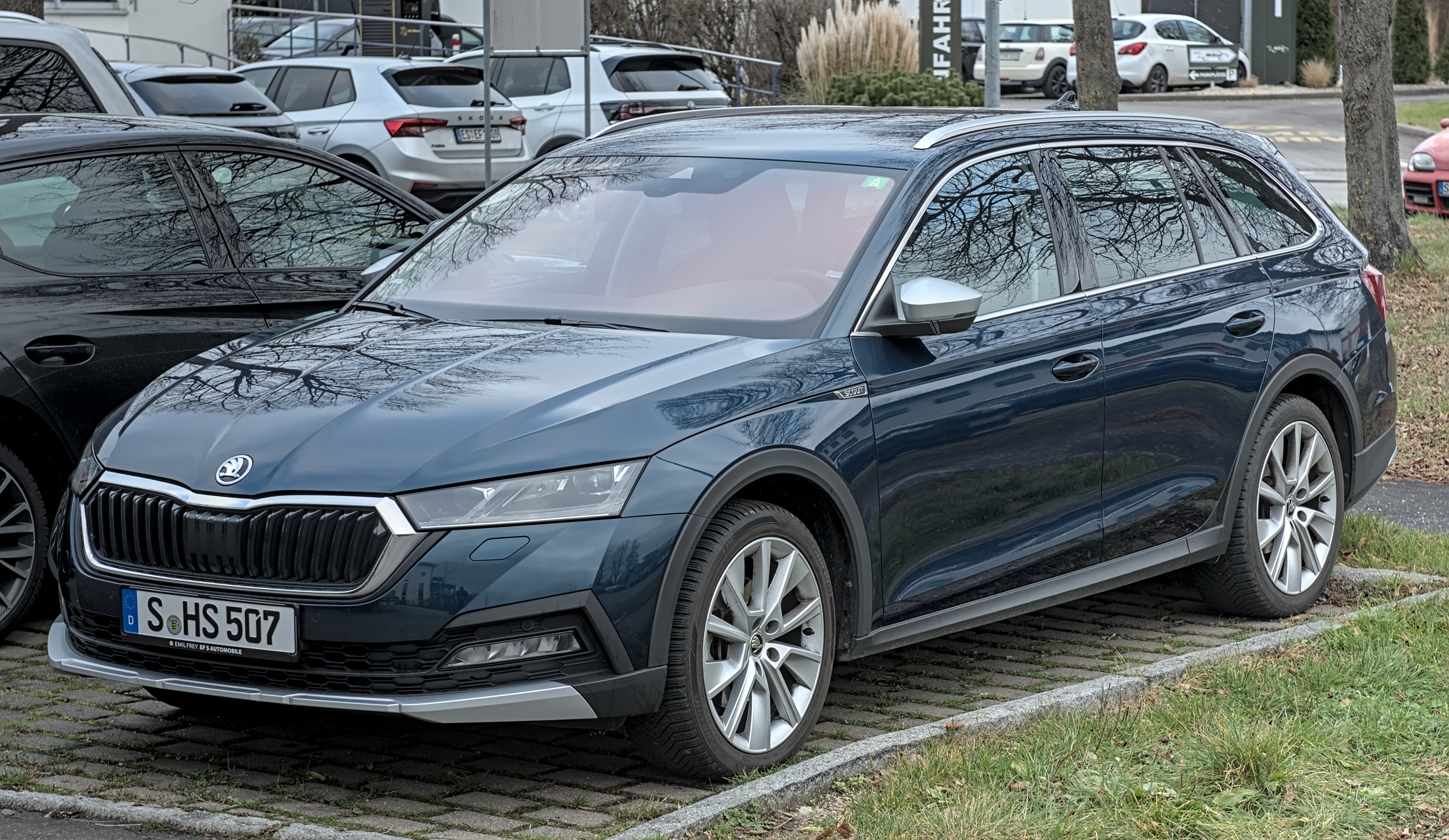
Octavia Scout (pre-facelift)

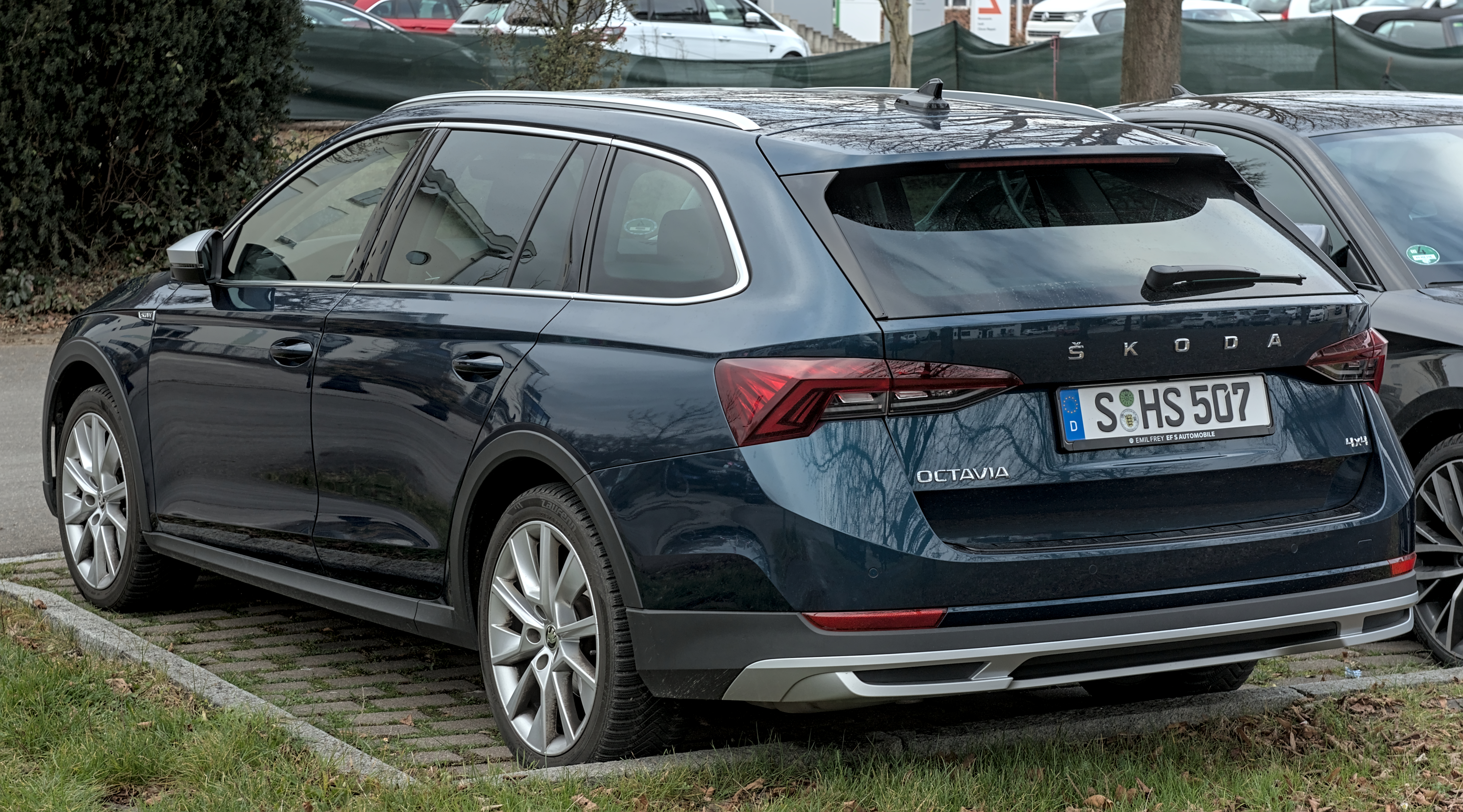
Octavia Scout (pre-facelift)

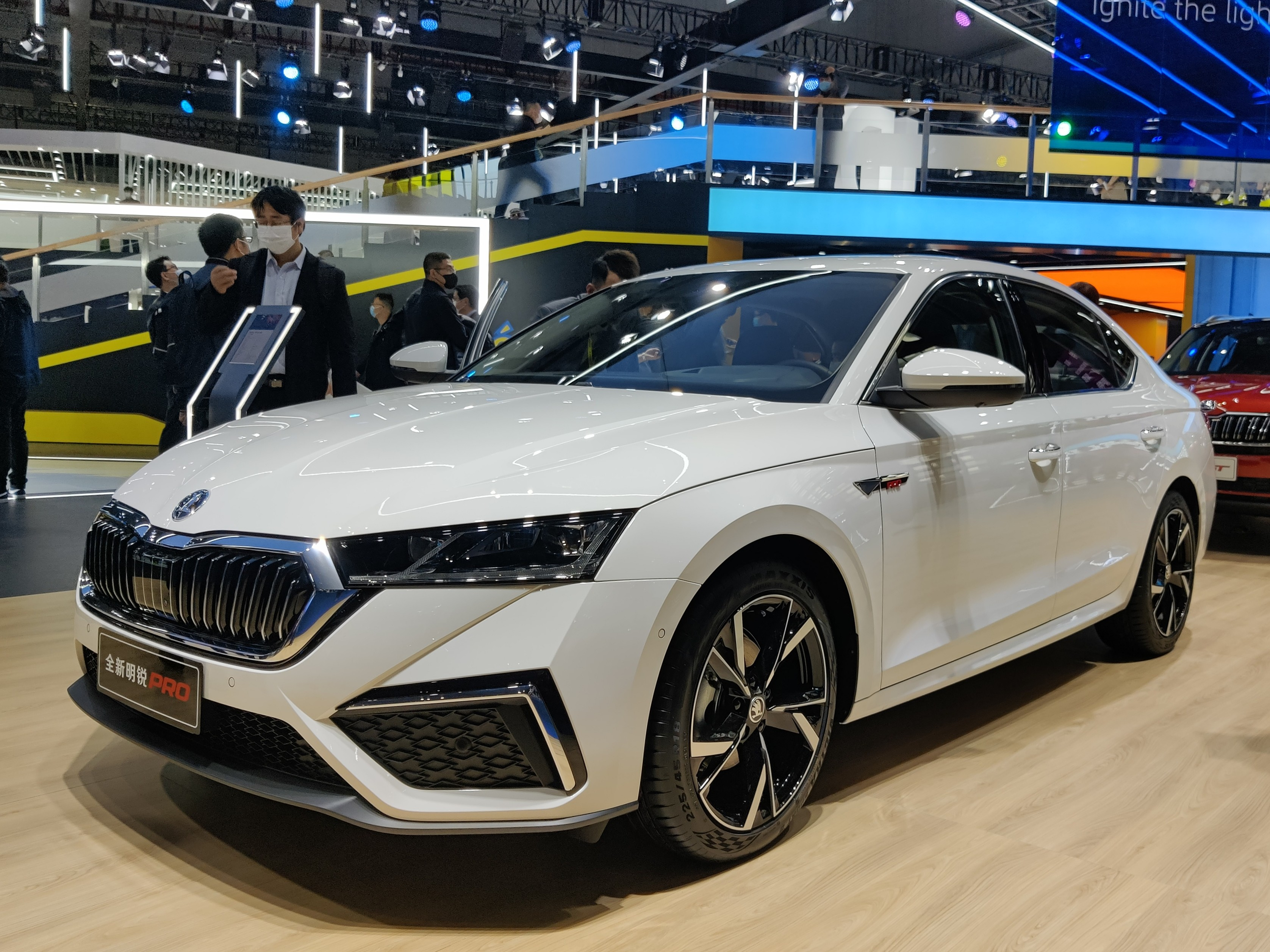
Octavia Pro (China)

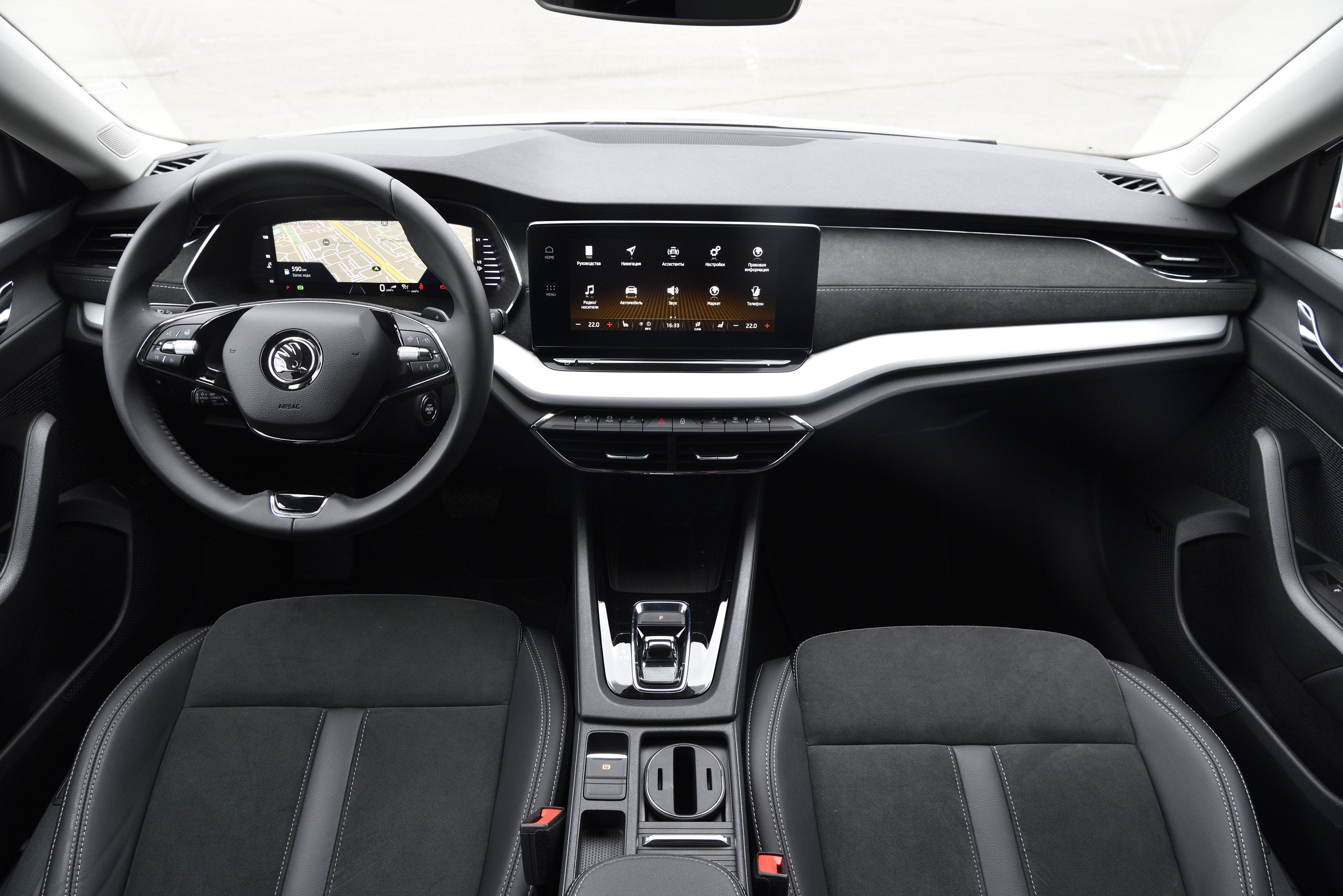
Interior

=== Facelift ===
A facelift for the Octavia Mk4 range was unveiled on 14 February 2024. Changes include a new grille, updated front and rear bumpers, new headlights (with the option of the new second-generation matrix LED type) and taillights, new exterior colours, new alloy wheel designs, the use of sustainable materials for seat upholstery and Simply Clever features, new colour choices and fabrics for the dashboard, updated graphics for instrument cluster, updated and added features for multimedia and safety, and increased power output for the high performance Octavia RS.

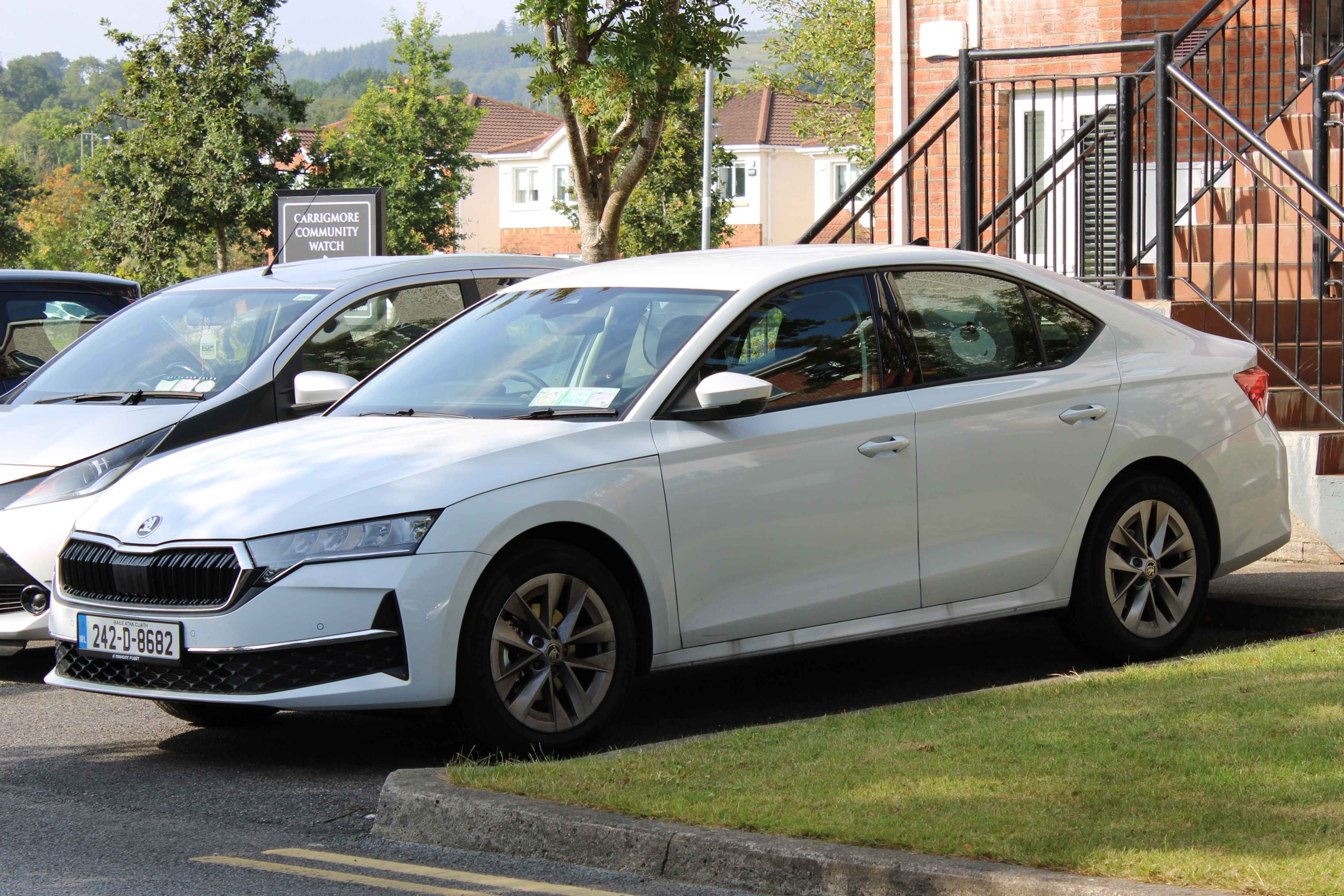
Liftback

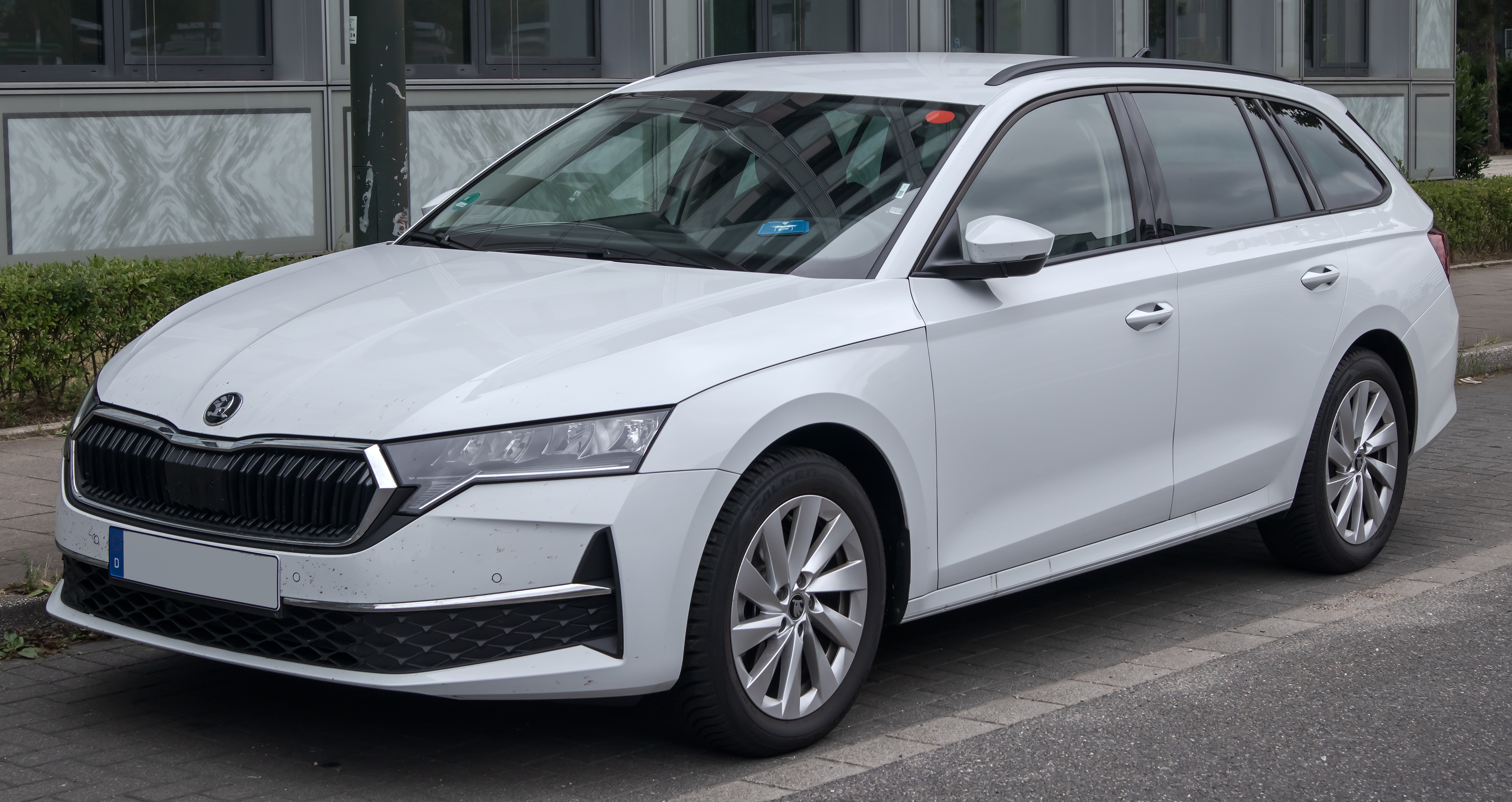
Octavia Combi (Facelift)

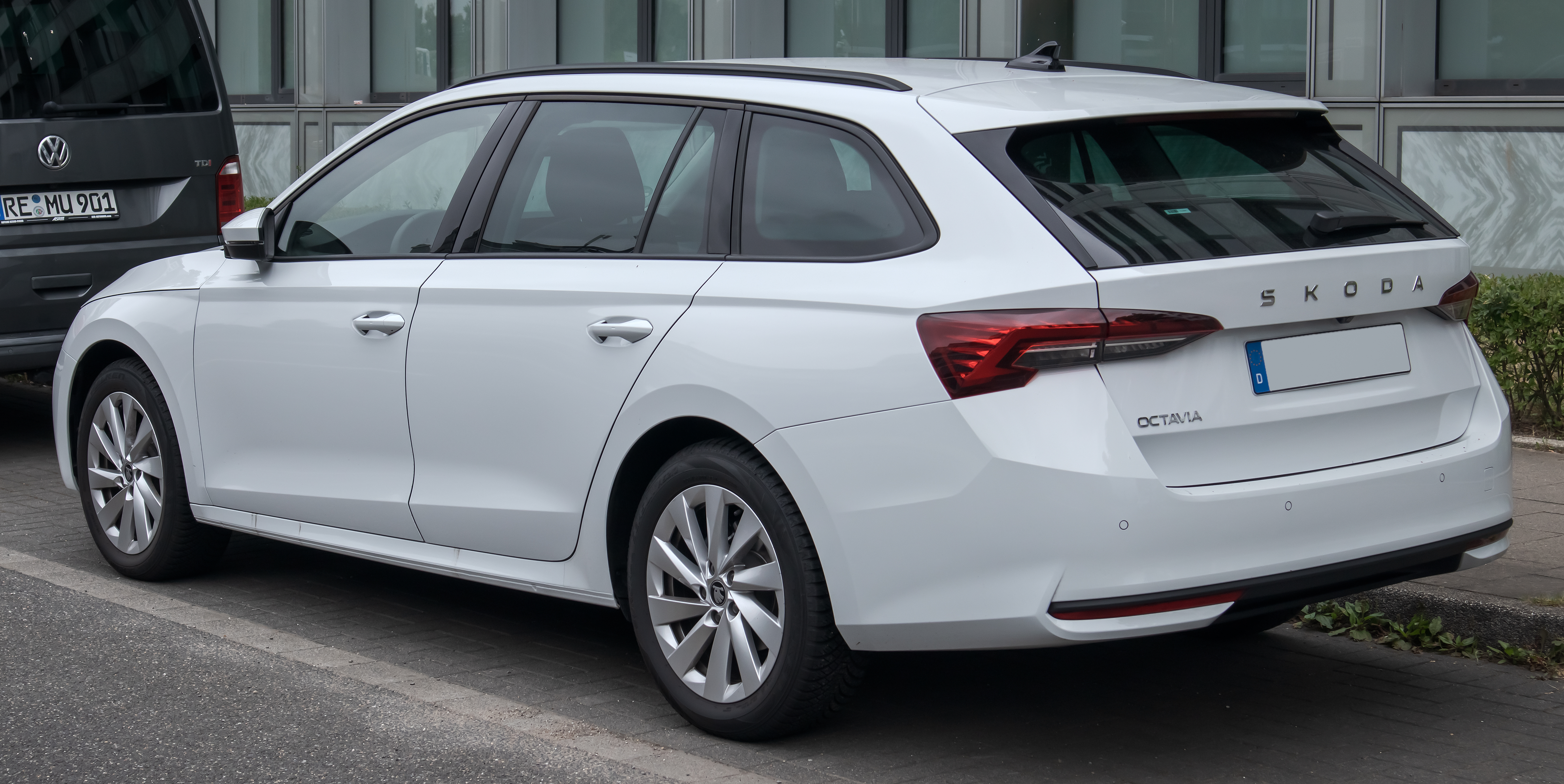
Rear View (Combi; facelift)

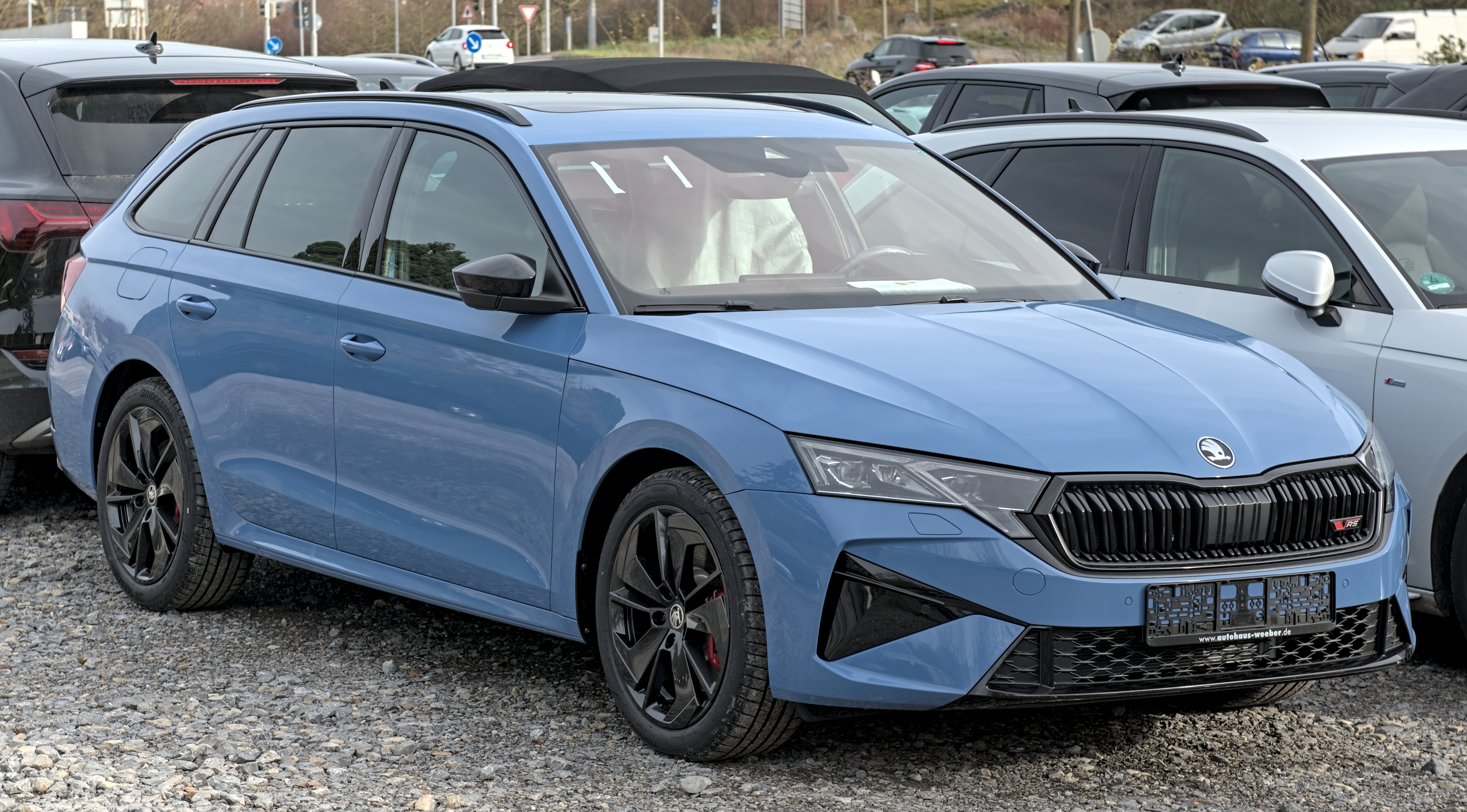
Octavia Combi RS

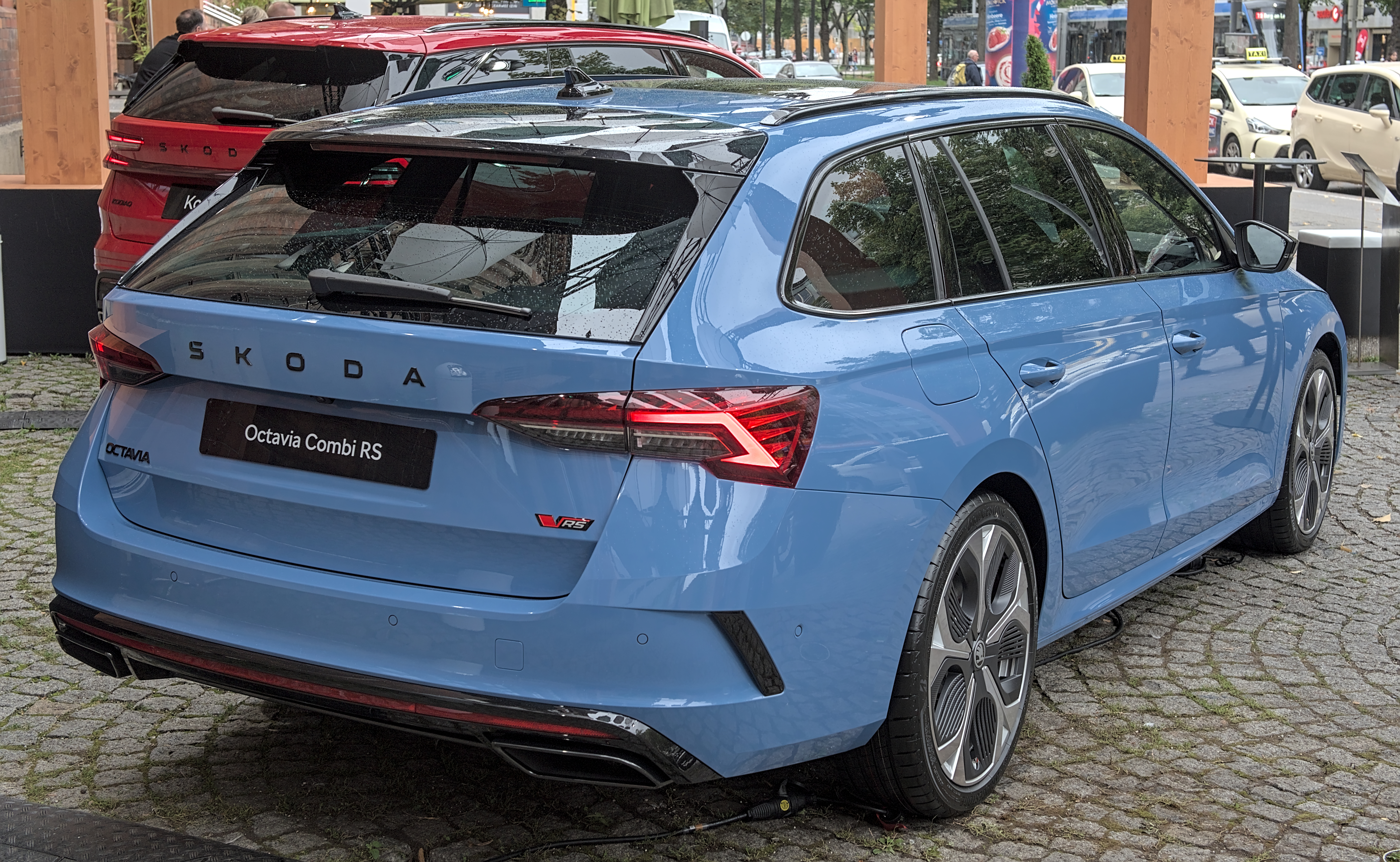
Rear View

=== Engines ===
Engine	Fuel type	Transmission	Max. power; rpm	Max. torque (rpm)	Top speed	0–100 km/h (0-62 mph)	Fuel consumption	CO_{2} emissions
1.0 TSI	petrol	6-speed manual, FWD	81 kW (110 hp); 5500	200 Nm (148 lb•ft); 2000-3000	202 km/h (126 mph)	10.9 s	4.7 L/100 km; 50 US MPG; 60 MPG (imperial)	107 g/km
1.4 TSI	petrol	6-speed manual / 8-Speed Automatic, FWD	110 kW (150 hp); 5000-6000	250 Nm (184 lb•ft); 1500-3500	222 km/h (138 mph)	8.2 s	4.8 L/100 km; 49 US MPG; 59 MPG (imperial)	131 g/km
1.4TSI PHEV	petrol & electric	6-speed automatic, FWD	150 kW (204 hp); 5000-6000	250 Nm (184.4 lb•ft); 1550-3500	220 km/h (137 mph)	7.5 s	0.98-1.06 L/100 km; 240-222 US MPG; 288-266 MPG (imperial)	20.92-23.85 g/km
1.4 TSI PHEV (for RS model)	petrol & electric	6-speed automatic, FWD	180 kW (245 hp); 5000-6000	400 Nm (295.02 lb•ft); 1500-3500	225 km/h (139 mph)	7.3 s	1.02- 1.17 L/100 km; 231-201 US MPG; 277-241 MPG (imperial)	25.58 - 26.89 g/km
1.5 TGI	CNG & petrol	6-speed manual / 7 speed automatic, FWD	96 kW (131 hp); 5000-6000	200 Nm (148.5 lb•ft); 1400-4000	218 km/h (mph)	9.5 s (Manual) 9.6 s (Automatic)	5.5-5.8 / 5.7-6.1 m^{3}/100 km	98.3-104.6 / 102.2-108.8 g/km
1.5 TSI	petrol	6-speed manual, FWD	110 kW (150 hp); 5000-6000	250 Nm (184 lb•ft); 1500-3500	224 km/h (139 mph)	8.4 s	4.8 L/100 km; 49 US MPG; 59 MPG (imperial)	111 g/km
1.6 MPI	petrol	6-speed automatic, FWD	81 kW (110 hp); 5800	152 Nm (114 lb•ft); 3800-4000	199 km/h (124 mph)	12.4 s	6.9 L/100 km; 34 US MPG; 41 MPG (imperial)	
2.0 TSI (for RS model)	petrol	6-speed manual / 7-speed automatic, FWD	180 kW (245 hp); 5000-6000	370 Nm (273 lb•ft); 1500-2500	250 km/h (155 mph)	6.8 s (Manual); 6.7 s (Automatic)	6.95 - 7.04 L/100 km; 34-33 US MPG; 41-40 MPG (imperial)	157.87 - 159.92 g/km
2.0 TSI AWD	petrol	7-speed automatic, AWD	140 kw (190 hp); 4200-6000	320 Nm (236 lb•ft) 1500-4100	239 km/h (149 mph)	6.8 s	6.9-7.3 L/100 km; 34-32 US MPG; 41-39 MPG (imperial)	157.6-166.7 g/km
2.0 TDI	diesel	6-speed manual, FWD	85 kW (115 hp); 2750-4250	300 Nm (221 lb•ft); 1500-2500	205 km/h (127 mph)	10.4 s	3.5 L/100 km; 67 US MPG; 80 MPG (imperial)	93 g/km
2.0 TDI	diesel	7-speed automatic, FWD	110 kW (150 hp); 3000-4200	340 Nm (251 lb•ft); 1700-2750	222 km/h (138 mph)	8.9 s	3.7 L/100 km; 64 US MPG; 76 MPG (imperial)	97 g/km
2.0 TDI	diesel	7-speed automatic, FWD/4WD	147 kW (200 hp); 3000-4200	400 Nm (295 lb•ft); 1700-2750	249 km/h (154 mph)	7.4 s	4.99 - 5.06 L/100 km; 47-46 US MPG; 57-56 MPG (imperial)	130.74 - 132.76 g/km

Liftback engines:

Engine	Fuel type	Transmission	Max. power; rpm	Max. torque (rpm)	Top speed	0–100 km/h (0-62 mph)	Fuel consumption	CO_{2} emissions
1.0 TSI	petrol	6-speed manual, FWD	81 kW (110 hp) 5500	200 Nm (148 lb•ft) 2000-3000	208 km/h (129 mph)	10.8 s	4.6 L/100 km; 51 US MPG; 61 MPG (imperial)	105 g/km
1.5 TSI	petrol	6-speed manual, FWD	110 kW (150 hp); 5000-6000	250 Nm (184 lb•ft); 1500-3500	230 km/h (143 mph)	8.2 s	4.7 L/100 km; 50 US MPG; 60 MPG (imperial)	109 g/km
2.0 TDI	diesel	6-speed manual, FWD	85 kW (115 hp); 2750-4250	300 Nm (221 lb•ft); 1500-2500	211 km/h (131 mph)	10.3 s	3.5 L/100 km; 67 US MPG; 81 MPG (imperial)	91 g/km
2.0 TDI	diesel	7-speed automatic, FWD	110 kW (150 hp); 3000-4200	340 Nm (295 lb•ft); 1700-2750	227 km/h (141 mph)	8.7 s	3.7 L/100 km; 64 US MPG; 76 MPG (imperial)	96 g/km

=== Awards ===
In January 2021, the Octavia Estate 1.4 TSI iV SE Technology was named Plug-in Hybrid of the Year by What Car? magazine. What Car? awarded the Octavia Estate five stars out of five in its review of the car.

=== Safety ===
==== ANCAP ====
ANCAP test results Skoda Octavia all variants excluding Scout (2019, aligned with Euro NCAP)
Test	Points	%
Overall:	5 /5 stars	
Adult occupant:	35.3	92%
Child occupant:	41.6	87%
Pedestrian:	35.5	73%
Safety assist:	10.2	79%

ANCAP test results Skoda Octavia all variants (2025, aligned with Euro NCAP)
Test	Points	%
Overall:	5 /5 stars	
Adult occupant:	34.22	85%
Child occupant:	40.04	81%
Pedestrian:	51.39	81%
Safety assist:	14.86	82%

ANCAP test results Skoda Octavia all variants (2022, aligned with Euro NCAP)
Test	Points	%
Overall:	5 /5 stars	
Adult occupant:	33.84	89%
Child occupant:	40.66	82%
Pedestrian:	37.11	68%
Safety assist:	13.7	81%

==== Euro NCAP ====
Euro NCAP test results Škoda Octavia Combi 1.5 TSI Ambition (LHD) (2019)
Test	Points	%
Overall:	5 /5 stars	
Adult occupant:	35.3	92%
Child occupant:	43.2	88%
Pedestrian:	35.5	73%
Safety assist:	10.3	79%

Euro NCAP test results Škoda Octavia Combi 1.5 TSI Selection (LHD) (2025)
Test	Points	%
Overall:	5 /5 stars	
Adult occupant:	34.2	85%
Child occupant:	40.2	82%
Pedestrian:	51.4	81%
Safety assist:	14.4	80%

== Sales ==
Year	Production
1996	1,168
1997	60,488
1998	117,616
1999	146,847
2000	153,790
2001	169,807
2002	163,198
2003	156,497
2004	181,067
2005	246,781
2006	269,774
2007	319,893
2008	355,037
2009	294,020
2010	357,142
2011	402,281
2012	406,360
2013	356,471
2014	397,433
2015	425,629
2016	445,415
2017	420,802
2018	400,210
2019	358,356
2020	233,902
2021	172,077
2022	141,499
2023	205,764
2024	214,210
2025	186,971

== Motorsport ==
The Škoda Octavia has been used in the World Rally Championship and the FIA 2-Litre World Rally Cup.
