= List of Volkswagen Group diesel engines =

Automotive manufacturer Volkswagen Group has produced diesel engines since the 1970s. Engines that are currently produced are listed in the article below, while engines no longer in production are listed in the List of discontinued Volkswagen Group diesel engines article.

== 1.4-2.0 litre EA288: 3&4 cylinder ==
The EA288 engine family is based on the EA189 engine family. EA288 diesel shares displacement, bore pitch, stroke and bore ratio with the EA189 and the new EA211 gasoline engines. It is a family of 3-cylinder and 4-cylinder diesel engines featuring modular diesel engine system (MDB (Modularer Diesel Motor Baukasten)), with dual-loop EGR system, with high pressure EGR and a cooled low-pressure EGR loops; variable valve train (VVT) with a camshaft adjuster, Bosch CRS 2-20 2000 bar common rail injection system, cylinder pressure control, a modular close-coupled after treatment system that includes a flow-through catalyst followed by a wall-flow diesel particulate filter (DPF). Euro 6 and US Tier 2 emission compliance is achieved via NOx adsorber-based system for smaller size vehicles or urea-SCR system for larger vehicles. Other features included low-friction bearings for the camshaft and balancer shafts, piston rings that have less pre-tension, a two-stage oil pump with volumetric flow control.

The engine's displacements were 1.4 litres (3 cylinders), 1.6 litres (4 cylinders) and 2.0 litres (4 cylinders), with power output between 66 and 176 kW.

The engine was to be first used in 2015 model years of Volkswagen Golf, Volkswagen Beetle, Volkswagen Passat, and Volkswagen Jetta.

=== 1.6 R4 16v TDI CR 55-88kW (EA288) ===
identification
parts code prefix: 04L
engine configuration & engine displacement
inline four-cylinder (R4/I4) Turbocharged Direct Injection (TDI) turbodiesel; 1,598 cc (97.5 cu in); bore x stroke: 79.5 mm × 80.5 mm (3.13 in × 3.17 in), stroke ratio: 0.99:1 – 'square engine', 399.5 cc per cylinder, compression ratio: 16.2:1

cylinder block & crankcase
grey cast iron; five main bearings, die-forged steel crankshaft

cylinder head & valvetrain
cast aluminium alloy; four valves per cylinder, 16 valves total, double overhead camshaft (DOHC)
aspiration
turbocharger, intercooler, water-cooled exhaust gas recirculation (EGR)
fuel system & engine management
common rail (CR) direct injection (DI) with eight-nozzle output piezo element injectors, rail pressure up to 2,000 bar (29,010 psi), European EU5 emissions standard (later EU6).
DIN-rated power & torque outputs, ID codes
59 kW (80 PS; 79 bhp) at 2,750-4,000 rpm; 230 N⋅m (170 lbf⋅ft) at 1,500-2,250 rpm — DGTC
66 kW (90 PS; 89 bhp) at 3,000 rpm; 250 N⋅m (184 lbf⋅ft) at 1,500-2,750 rpm — CLHB
66 kW (90 PS; 89 bhp) at 3,000 rpm; 250 N⋅m (184 lbf⋅ft) at 1,500-3,000 rpm — CXXA, DDYB
77 kW (105 PS; 103 bhp) at 3,000 rpm; 250 N⋅m (184 lbf⋅ft) at 1,500-2,750 rpm — CLHA
81 kW (110 PS; 109 bhp) at 3,000 rpm; 250 N⋅m (184 lbf⋅ft) at 1,500-3,000 rpm — CXXB, DBKA
81 kW (110 PS; 109 bhp) at 3,000 rpm; 250 N⋅m (184 lbf⋅ft) at 1,500-2,750 rpm — CRKB
85 kW (116 PS; 114 bhp) at 3,000 rpm; 250 N⋅m (184 lbf⋅ft) at 1,500-2,750 rpm — DDYA, DGTE
88 kW (120 PS; 118 bhp) at 3,000 rpm; 250 N⋅m (184 lbf⋅ft) at 1,500-2,750 rpm — DCXA, DCZA

=== 2.0 R4 16v TDI CR 81-176kW (EA288) ===
identification
Motor type: EA288 / parts code prefix: 04L
engine configuration & engine displacement
inline four-cylinder (R4/I4) Turbocharged Direct Injection (TDI) turbodiesel; 1,968 cc (120.1 cu in);bore x stroke: 81.0 mm × 95.5 mm (3.19 in × 3.76 in), stroke ratio: 0.85:1 – undersquare/long-stroke, 492.1 cc per cylinder, compression ratio: 16.2:1 (110 kW), 15.8:1 (140 kW), 15.5:1 (176 kW)
cylinder block & crankcase
grey cast iron; five main bearings, die-forged steel crankshaft, fracture-split forged steel connecting rods, two counter-rotating gear-driven balance shafts turning at twice the crankshaft speed
cylinder head & valvetrain
cast aluminium alloy; four valves per cylinder, 16 valves total, low-friction roller finger cam followers with automatic hydraulic valve clearance compensation, timing belt and double overhead camshaft (DOHC)
aspiration
hot-film air mass meter, electronically regulated variable geometry turbocharger integrated into cast iron exhaust manifold, air-to-water intercooler
fuel system & engine management
low-pressure fuel tank mounted fuel lift pump with underfloor electric fuel relay pump, timing belt-driven high-pressure injection pump delivering up to 2,000 bar (29,010 psi) pressure for the common rail (CR) fuel rail
exhaust system
water-cooled exhaust gas recirculation (EGR), catalytic converter, diesel particulate filter (DPF), nitrogen oxide catalytic converter, sulphur catalytic converter.
DIN-rated power & torque outputs, ID codes, applications
75 kW (102 PS; 101 bhp) at 2,900 - 4,000 rpm; 225 N⋅m (166 lbf⋅ft) at 1,300-2800 rpm — DFSC, DFSD, DFSF Caddy 2K
110 kW (150 PS; 148 bhp) at 3,000 – 4,000 rpm; 320 N⋅m (236 lbf⋅ft) at 1,750–3,000 rpm — Passat B8 Golf SV
110 kW (150 PS; 148 bhp) at 3,000 – 4,000 rpm; 340 N⋅m (251 lbf⋅ft) at 1,750–3,000 rpm — CRLB, CRMB, DFEA, DFEB, DFFA, DFGA Passat B8, T-Roc, Skoda Octavia Scout Mk3
110 kW (150 PS; 148 bhp) at 3,500 rpm; 320 N⋅m (236 lbf⋅ft) at 1,750–3,000 rpm — CRBC Audi A3, Golf VII, Golf VIII, SEAT Leon
135 kW (184 PS; 181 bhp) at 4,000 rpm; 380 N⋅m (280 lbf⋅ft) at 1,750–3,000 rpm — CUNA, CUPA Audi A3, Golf VII, SEAT Leon
140 kW (190 PS; 188 bhp) at 3,500 – 4,000 rpm; 400 N⋅m (295 lbf⋅ft) at 1,750–3,000 rpm — DDAA, DFCA Passat B8
140 kW (190 PS; 188 bhp) at 3,800 rpm; 400 N⋅m (300 lbf⋅ft) — CNHA Audi B8 A4, Volkswagen Passat 2015<
147 kW (200 PS; 197 bhp) at 3,800 rpm; 400 N⋅m (300 lbf⋅ft) — CNHA Volkswagen Golf GTD MK8, Škoda Octavia RS
150 kW (204PS) — DMZA Volkswagen Transporter T6.1 BiTDI 2020+
176 kW (239 PS; 236 bhp) at 4,000 rpm; 500 N⋅m (369 lbf⋅ft) — CUAA Volkswagen Passat 2015 TDI BiTurbo, Volkswagen Arteon

== 2.5 litre: 5 cylinders ==
=== 2.5 R5 SDI 40-55kW ===
identification
parts code prefix: ???
engine configuration & engine displacement
inline five-cylinder (R5) Suction Diesel Injection (SDI); 2,461 cc (150.2 cu in); bore x stroke: 81.0 mm × 95.5 mm (3.19 in × 3.76 in), stroke ratio: 0.85:1 – undersquare/long-stroke, 492.1 cc per cylinder, compression ratio: 19.0:1
cylinder block & crankcase
grey cast iron; six main bearings, die-forged steel crossplane crankshaft, 'bowl in piston' combustion chamber
cylinder head & valvetrain
cast aluminium alloy; two valves per cylinder, 10 valves total, hydraulic bucket tappets with automatic valve clearance compensation, timing belt-driven single overhead camshaft (SOHC), swirl-inducing intake ports
aspiration
cast aluminium alloy intake manifold, cast iron exhaust manifold (water-cooled in marine applications)
fuel system & engine management
rubber toothed belt-driven Bosch VP37 (German: VerteilerPumpe) electronic distributor injection pump, two-stage direct injection (DI) with five-hole injector nozzles; Bosch MDC Marine Diesel Control electronic engine control unit
mass
245 kg (540 lb) (Marine versions: dry weight, with DMF, all ancillaries and cooling system)
DIN-rated (Marine to ISO 8178-4) power & torque outputs, applications, ID codes
40 kW (54 PS; 54 bhp) at 2,500 rpm (16.3 kW/L); 155 N⋅m (114 lbf⋅ft) at 2,250 rpm — Volkswagen Marine SDI 55-5 (BCT: 02/02-on)
55 kW (75 PS; 74 bhp) at 3,600 rpm (22.3 kW/L); 155 N⋅m (114 lbf⋅ft) at 2,250 rpm — Volkswagen Marine SDI 75-5 (ANF: 02/02-on)
55 kW (75 PS; 74 bhp) (22.3 kW/L); 160 N⋅m (118 lbf⋅ft) at 2,250 rpm — Volkswagen LT (LT28 & LT35) (AGX: 05/96-04/01)
references
"Boat engines from Volkswagen Marine – Self-study programme M001 – Design and function" (PDF). vw-m.de. Volkswagen AG. April 2001. Archived from the original (PDF) on 19 July 2011.
"SDI 55-5 – technical data". vw-m.de. Volkswagen AG. Archived from the original on 19 July 2011.
"SDI 75-5 – technical data". vw-m.de. Volkswagen AG. Archived from the original on 19 July 2011.

=== 2.5 R5 TDI 65-121kW ===
This 2.5-litre inline five engine (R5), wholly designed and developed by Audi, was the first Turbocharged Direct Injection (TDI) diesel engine in 1989, initially used in the Audi 100. This engine was also used in some Volvo Cars models in the 1990s.

identification
parts code prefix: ???, ID codes: 1T, AAT, ACV, AEL, AHY, AJT, ANG, ANH, ANJ, AXG, BBR, BCU, BCV, BTW, Volvo D5252T
engine configuration & engine displacement
inline five-cylinder (R5) Turbocharged Direct Injection (TDI) turbodiesel; 2,461 cc (150.2 cu in); bore x stroke: 81.0 mm × 95.5 mm (3.19 in × 3.76 in), stroke ratio: 0.85:1 – undersquare/long-stroke, 492.1 cc per cylinder, compression ratio: 19.0:1
cylinder block & crankcase
grey cast iron; six main bearings, die-forged steel crossplane crankshaft, 'bowl in piston' combustion chamber
cylinder head & valvetrain
cast aluminium alloy; two valves per cylinder, 10 valves total, hydraulic bucket tappets with automatic valve clearance compensation, timing belt-driven single overhead camshaft (SOHC), swirl-inducing intake ports
aspiration
cast aluminium alloy intake manifold, cast iron exhaust manifold (water-cooled in marine applications), Garrett Variable Turbine Geometry (VTG) variable-vane turbocharger (water-cooled in marine applications), sea-water intercooler on Marine 108 kW and above
fuel system & engine management
rubber toothed belt-driven Bosch VP37 (German: VerteilerPumpe) electronic distributor injection pump, two-stage direct injection (DI) with five-hole injector nozzles, Bosch MDC Marine Diesel Control electronic engine control unit
mass
Marine variants: 255–265 kg (562–584 lb) (dry weight, with DMF, all ancillaries and cooling system)
EWG-rated power & torque outputs, application, ID code
80 kW (109 PS; 107 bhp) (32.5 kW/L) — Volkswagen Industrial Motor (BBR: 07/92->)
DIN-rated power & torque outputs, applications, ID codes
65 kW (88 PS; 87 bhp) (26.4 kW/L); 195 N⋅m (144 lbf⋅ft) at 1,900 rpm — Volkswagen Transporter (T4)
74 kW (101 PS; 99 bhp) at 2,600 rpm (30.1 kW/L); 275 N⋅m (203 lbf⋅ft) at 2,500 rpm — Volkswagen Marine TDI 100-5 (BCU: 02/02->)
75 kW (102 PS; 101 bhp) (30.5 kW/L); 250 N⋅m (184 lbf⋅ft) at 1,900 rpm — Volkswagen Transporter (T4)
80 kW (109 PS; 107 bhp) (32.5 kW/L); 280 N⋅m (207 lbf⋅ft) at 1,900 rpm — Volkswagen LT
85 kW (116 PS; 114 bhp) (34.5 kW/L); 265 N⋅m (195 lbf⋅ft) at 1,900 rpm — Audi C4 100
88 kW (120 PS; 118 bhp) at 3,250 rpm (35.8 kW/L); 275 N⋅m (203 lbf⋅ft) at 2,500 rpm — Audi C3 100, Volkswagen Marine TDI 120-5 (ANG: 02/02->)
103 kW (140 PS; 138 bhp) (41.9 kW/L); 290 N⋅m (214 lbf⋅ft) at 1,900 rpm — Audi C4 A6, as Volvo D5252T: Volvo 850, Volvo S70, Volvo V70 (first and second generation), early Volvo S80s (AEL/D5252T: 09/94->)
108 kW (147 PS; 145 bhp) at 4,000 rpm (43.9 kW/L); 310 N⋅m (229 lbf⋅ft) at 1,900 rpm — Volkswagen Marine TDI 150-5D (BCV: 02/02->)
111 kW (151 PS; 149 bhp) (45.1 kW/L); 295 N⋅m (218 lbf⋅ft) at 1,900 rpm — Volkswagen Transporter (T4) (AHY, AXG: xx/98-xx/03)
111 kW (151 PS; 149 bhp) at 3,500 rpm (45.1 kW/L); 310 N⋅m (229 lbf⋅ft) at 1,700-3,100 rpm — Volkswagen Marine TDI 140-5 (???: ??/??->)
111 kW (151 PS; 149 bhp) at 4,000 rpm (45.1 kW/L); 310 N⋅m (229 lbf⋅ft) at 2,500 rpm — Volkswagen Marine TDI 150-5 (ANH: 02/02->)
121 kW (165 PS; 162 bhp) at 4,000 rpm (49.2 kW/L); 310 N⋅m (229 lbf⋅ft) at 2,500 rpm — Volkswagen Marine TDI 165-5 (BTW: 04/05-on)
references
"Boat engines from Volkswagen Marine – Self-study programme M001 – Design and function" (PDF). vw-m.de. Volkswagen AG. April 2001. Archived from the original (PDF) on 19 July 2011.
"TDI 100-5 – technical data". vw-m.de. Volkswagen AG. Archived from the original on 19 July 2011.
"TDI 120-5 – technical data". vw-m.de. Volkswagen AG. Archived from the original on 19 July 2011.
"TDI 140-5 – technical data". vw-m.de. Volkswagen AG. Archived from the original on 19 July 2011.
"TDI 150-5 – technical data". vw-m.de. Volkswagen AG. Archived from the original on 19 July 2011.
"TDI 165-5 – technical data". vw-m.de. Volkswagen AG. Archived from the original on 19 July 2011.

=== 2.5 R5 TDI CR 65-120kW ===
identification
parts code prefix: ???, ID codes: ???
engine configuration & engine displacement
inline five-cylinder (R5) Turbocharged Direct Injection (TDI) turbodiesel; 2,461 cc (150.2 cu in); bore x stroke: 81.0 mm × 95.5 mm (3.19 in × 3.76 in), stroke ratio: 0.85:1 – undersquare/long-stroke, 492.1 cc per cylinder, compression ratio: 18.0:1
cylinder block & crankcase
grey cast iron GG350; six main bearings, die-forged steel crossplane crankshaft, 'bowl in piston' combustion chamber
cylinder head & valvetrain
cast aluminium alloy; two valves per cylinder, 10 valves total, hydraulic bucket tappets with automatic valve clearance compensation, timing belt-driven single overhead camshaft (SOHC), swirl-inducing intake ports
aspiration
turbocharger, intercooler; 80 kW and higher: Variable Turbine Geometry (VTG) variable-vane turbocharger
fuel system & engine management
common rail (CR) direct injection pump, pressure up to 1,600 bar; Bosch EDC16 electronic engine control unit (ECU)
exhaust system
diesel particulate filter (DPF)
DIN-rated power & torque outputs, ID codes
65 kW (88 PS; 87 bhp) at 3,500 rpm; 220 N⋅m (162 lbf⋅ft) at 2,000 rpm — BJJ
80 kW (109 PS; 107 bhp) at 3,500 rpm; 280 N⋅m (207 lbf⋅ft) at 2,000 rpm — BJK
100 kW (136 PS; 134 bhp) at 3,500 rpm; 320 N⋅m (236 lbf⋅ft) at 2,000 rpm — BJL
120 kW (163 PS; 161 bhp) at 3,500 rpm; 350 N⋅m (258 lbf⋅ft) at 2,000 rpm — BJM
application
Volkswagen Crafter
reference
"Volkswagen Crafter – Engine specification". Volkswagen-Vans.co.uk. Volkswagen Commercial Vehicles. Archived from the original on 11 January 2010.

=== 2.5 R5 TDI PD 96-128kW ===
identification
parts code prefix: AXD, ID codes: AXE, BNZ
engine configuration & engine displacement
inline five-cylinder (R5) Turbocharged Direct Injection (TDI) turbodiesel; 2,461 cc (150.2 cu in); bore x stroke: 81.0 mm × 95.5 mm (3.19 in × 3.76 in), stroke ratio: 0.85:1 – undersquare/long-stroke, 492.1 cc per cylinder,[compression ratio: 18.0:1
cylinder block & crankcase
aluminum alloy; six main bearings, die-forged steel 5-throw crankshaft, 'bowl in piston' combustion chamber
cylinder head & valvetrain
cast aluminum alloy; two valves per cylinder, 10 valves total, hydraulic bucket tappets with automatic valve clearance compensation, gear-driven single overhead camshaft (SOHC), swirl-inducing intake ports
aspiration
Variable Turbine Geometry (VTG) variable-vane turbocharger, intercooler
fuel system & engine management
camshaft-actuated Bosch Pumpe Düse Unit Injector direct injection
DIN-rated power & torque outputs
96 kW (131 PS; 129 bhp) — Volkswagen Transporter (T5)
128 kW (174 PS; 172 bhp) at 3,500 rpm; 400 N⋅m (295 lbf⋅ft) at 2,000 rpm
applications
Volkswagen Touareg, Volkswagen Transporter (T5)

== 2.5-3.0 litre: 6 cylinders ==
2.5 litre: 6 cylinders EA330

V6 Engine, Turbocharged Direct Injection (TDI) turbodiesel, 2496 cm^{3} (152.3 cu-in), bore x stroke: 78.3 mm x 86.4mm (3,08 x 3,4 in) , numbers of valves 24, compression ratio 19

1. 2.7 litre: 6 cylinders

=== 2.7 V6 TDI CR 120-140kW ===
This is a stroke-reduced version of the 3.0 V6 TDI CR

identification
parts code prefix: 4F0
engine configuration & engine displacement
90° V6 engine, Turbocharged Direct Injection (TDI) turbodiesel; 2,698 cc (164.6 cu in), bore x stroke: 83.0 mm × 83.1 mm (3.27 in × 3.27 in), stroke ratio: 1.00:1 – 'square engine', 449.6 cc per cylinder
cylinder block & crankcase
compacted vermicular graphite cast iron (GJV/CGI); four main bearings, oil cooler
cylinder heads & valvetrain
cast aluminium alloy; ??????
aspiration
single variable-geometry turbine (VGT) turbocharger
fuel system & engine management
common rail (CR) direct diesel injection, separate high-pressure pump and rail for each bank of cylinders, maximum injection pressure of 1,600 bar (23,210 psi), piezo injectors, up to five injections per piston cycle
DIN-rated power & torque outputs, applications, ID codes
120 kW (163 PS; 161 bhp) — Audi A4 (BSG: 11/05-06/08, CAM: 11/07-05/08, CGK: 06/08->), Audi A5 (CAM: 09/07-05/08, CGK: 05/08->), Audi A6 (BSG: 01/05-10/08, CAN: 10/08->)
132 kW (179 PS; 177 bhp) at 3,300-4,250 rpm; 380 N⋅m (280 lbf⋅ft) at 1,400-3,300 rpm — Audi A4 (BPP: 01/06-03/09), Audi A6 (BPP: 11/04-10/08)
140 kW (190 PS; 188 bhp) — Audi A4 (CAM: 11/07-05/08, CGK: 06/08->), Audi A5 (CAM: 07/07-05/08, CGK: 05/08->), Audi A6 (CAN: 10/08->)
references
"New 2.7 TDI model boosts Audi A6 in the UK" (Press release). Audi UK. 23 November 2004.
"Compacted Vermicular Cast Iron (GJV) for the Audi V6 diesel engine". ATZonline.com. GWV Fachverlage GmbH. October 2004.

=== EA 897 ===
VW EA 897 is a diesel engine series of Volkswagen AG, which was developed by Audi. The series comprises six cylinder – V-engines with 3.0 liter displacement and is used in various vehicles of the Volkswagen Group since 2010. The engines are produced by Audi Hungaria Zrt. in Győr .

The Gen3 variant increases engine power up to 286 PS (210 kW; 282 bhp) on Audi Q5.

=== 3.0 V6 24v TDI CR 150–210 kW ===
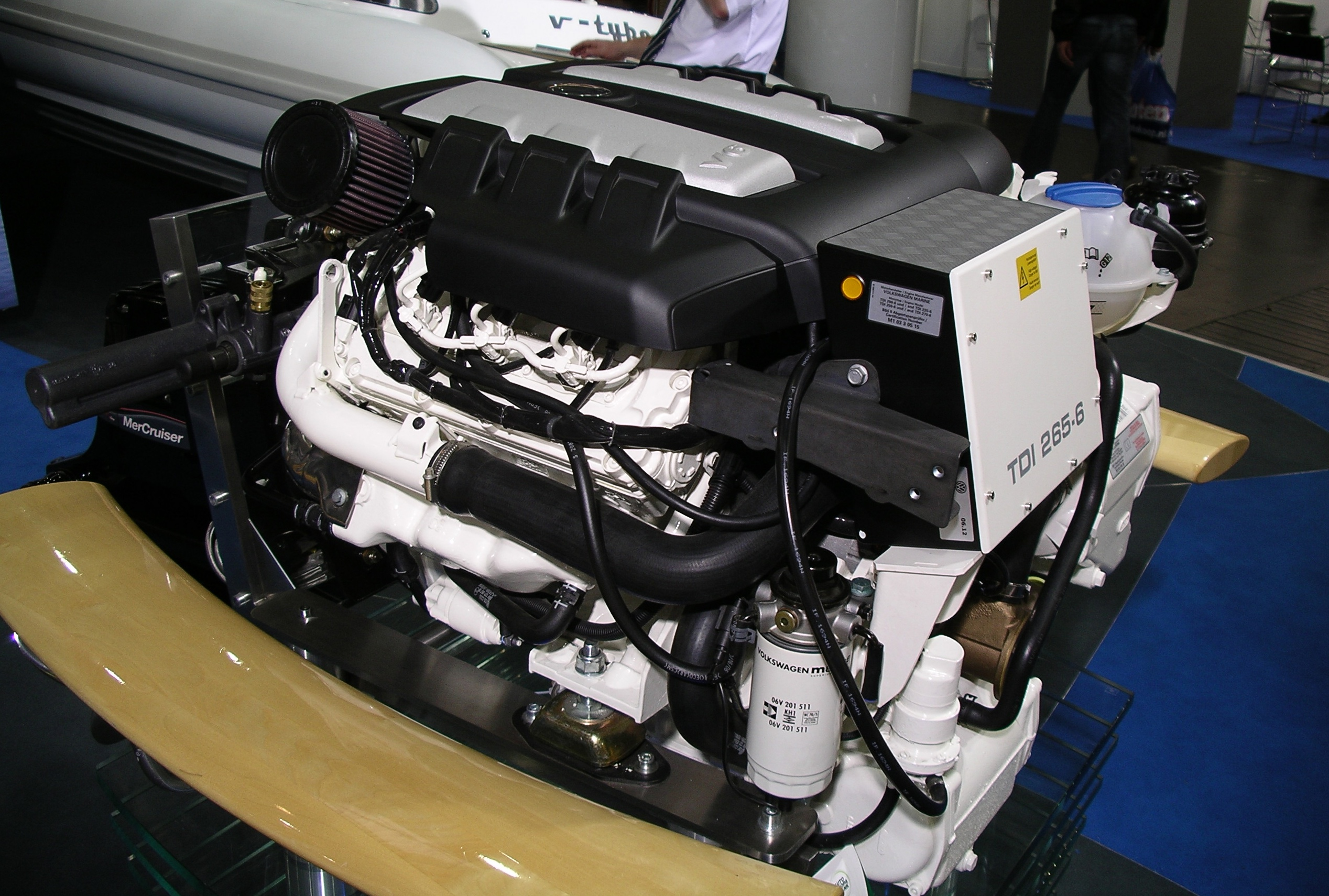
Volkswagen Marine 3.0-litre V6 TDI 265-6 marine engine. This is a marine-modified version of the 3.0 V6 24v TDI CR automobile engine.

This common rail V6 turbodiesel was developed by Audi, and first installed in the Audi D3 A8 in 2004. Subsequently, made available for all longitudinal engined Audis, along with the same engine orientation in Volkswagen Passenger Cars 'premium' models and Volkswagen Marine applications. Also related to VW's diesel emissions scandal.

identification
parts code prefix: 059
engine configuration and engine displacement
90° V6 engine, Turbocharged Direct Injection (TDI) turbodiesel; 2,967 cc (181.1 cu in); bore x stroke: 83.0 mm × 91.4 mm (3.27 in × 3.60 in), stroke ratio: 0.91:1 – undersquare/long-stroke, 494.5 cc per cylinder, compression ratio 17.0:1
cylinder block and crankcase
compacted vermicular graphite cast iron (GJV/CGI) with UV laser-honed exposed bores; cast bed-plate reinforcing lower bearing frame incorporating four main bearings each affixed with four bolts, balance shaft, die-forged steel crossplane crankshaft with offset crankpins to create an even firing order, simplex roller chain-driven contra-rotating balance shaft mounted within the 'vee', diagonal fracture-split connecting rods, oil-channel–cooled pistons with 'bowl in piston' combustion chamber, two-part oil sump with multi-chamber baffled insert, chain-driven ancillaries, oil filter module (incorporating cyclonic oil separator and water-to-oil cooler) mounted within the 'vee'
cylinder heads & valvetrain
cast aluminium alloy; four valves per cylinder, 24 valves total, low-friction roller finger cam followers with hydraulic valve clearance compensation, double overhead camshafts driven by four simplex roller chains and spur gears (hybrid relay method), dual inlet ports, siamesed exhaust ports
aspiration
hot-film air mass meter, two separate cast alloy intake manifolds, one BorgWarner variable geometry turbocharger (VGT) with electric boost control fitted within the Vee (water-cooled on Marine variants), maximum absolute pressure 2.3 bar (33 psi), two parallel side-mounted intercoolers (SMICs), sea-water tube intercooler on Marine variants, two cast iron exhaust manifolds (water-cooled on Marine variants)
fuel system, exhaust system and engine management
common rail (CR) diesel direct injection, initially one later two separate timing belt-driven high-pressure injection pumps and rail for each cylinder bank, rail pressure of 230 to 1,600 bar (3,340 to 23,210 psi), centrally sited seven-hole piezo injectors, dual pilot injection and up to five main injection pulses per piston cycle; water-cooled exhaust gas recirculation (EGR), catalytic converter and diesel particulate filter (DPF); Bosch EDC16 electronic engine control unit (ECU), Bosch MDC16 CP34 Marine Diesel Control on Marine variants
Dimensions
length: 444 mm (17.5 in), mass: 219 kg (483 lb) (automotive), 325 kg (717 lb) (Marine variants – dry weight, including DMF, cooling system and all ancillaries)
DIN-rated power and torque outputs, applications, ID codes
150 kW (204 PS; 201 bhp) at 3,500 rpm (50.6kW/L, 68.8PS/L); 450 N⋅m (332 lbf⋅ft) at 1,400 rpm — Audi B7 A4 (BKN: 11/04-03/09), Audi Q7 4L (CJMA: 10/10-03/15)
155 kW (211 PS; 208 bhp) (52.2kW/L, 71.1PS/L) — Audi Q7 (BUN: 03/06-11/07), Volkswagen Touareg (BUN: 04/06-11/07, CAS: 11/07->)
160 kW (218 PS; 215 bhp) at 3,250-4,750 rpm (53.9kW/L, 73.4PS/L); 500 N⋅m (369 lbf⋅ft) at 1,250-3,000 rpm — Audi A6#C7, Audi A7 (2014+)
165 kW (224 PS; 221 bhp) at 4,200 rpm (55.6kW/L, 75.5PS/L); 500 N⋅m (369 lbf⋅ft) at 2,000 rpm – Audi C6 A6 (BMK: 04/04-05/06), Volkswagen Phaeton (BMK: 05/04-05/07), Volkswagen Touareg (BKS: 11/04-05/08, CATA: 02/09->), Volkswagen Marine TDI 225-6 (BSP: 02/06->)
165 kW (224 PS; 221 bhp) at 4,500 rpm (55.6kW/L, 75.5PS/L); 550 N⋅m (406 lbf⋅ft) at 1,500 rpm – 2,500 rpm – Volkswagen Amarok (DDXC: 10/16->)
171 kW (232 PS; 229 bhp) at 4,000 rpm (57.6kW/L, 78.2PS/L); 500 N⋅m (369 lbf⋅ft) at 1,750 rpm, 450 N⋅m (332 lbf⋅ft) between 1,400-3,250 rpm — Audi B7 A4 (ASB: 01/06-03/09), Audi C6 A6 (ASB: 05/06-10/08), Audi D3 A8 (ASB: 01/04->), Audi Q7 (BUG: 03/06-05/08), Volkswagen Phaeton (CARA: 06/07-11/08)
176 kW (239 PS; 236 bhp) at 4,000 rpm (59.3kW/L, 80.6PS/L); 500 N⋅m (369 lbf⋅ft) at 1,500–3,000 rpm — Audi B7 A4 (CAP: 11/07-05/08), Audi B8 A4 (CCW: 04/08-7/11, CCL: 11/09-7/11>), Audi A5 (CAP: 06/07-05/08, CCW: 03/08->), Audi C6 A6 (CDY: 10/08->), Audi Q5 (CCW: 11/08->), Audi Q7 (CASA: 11/07-05/10, CCMA: 11/08->), Porsche Cayenne (2009->), Volkswagen Phaeton (CARA: 03/07-06/07, CEXA: 06/08-05/10), Volkswagen Touareg (CASA/CASB/CASC: 11/07->)
180 kW (245 PS; 241 bhp) at 4,000-4,500 rpm; 550 N⋅m (406 lbf⋅ft) at 1,450-3,250 rpm — Audi A4#B8, Audi A5 (2011+); Audi A6#C7, Audi A7 (2010-2014), Volkswagen Touareg (2011+)
195 kW (265 PS; 261 bhp) at 4,200 rpm (65.7kW/L, 89.3PS/L); 550 N⋅m (406 lbf⋅ft) at 2,000 rpm — Volkswagen Marine TDI 265-6 (CEZA: 12/07->)
200 kW (272 PS; 268 bhp) at 3,500-4,250 rpm; 580 N⋅m (428 lbf⋅ft) at 1,250-3,250 rpm — Audi A6#C7, Audi A7 (2014-2017)
210 kW (286 PS; 282 bhp) at 4,000 rpm; 620 N⋅m (457 lbf⋅ft) at 1,750-3,000 rpm — Audi A4, Audi A5, Audi A6#C8, Audi A7, Audi A8, Audi Q7, Audi Q8 (2017+)
references
ID & detail from ETKA
"New Audi A6 – in depth". WorldCarFans.com. Audi AG. 8 April 2004.
"New VW Touareg V6 TDI". WorldCarFans.com. 17 November 2004.
"Compacted Vermicular Cast Iron (GJV) for the Audi V6 diesel engine". ATZonline.com. GWV Fachverlage GmbH. October 2004.
"Compacted Graphite Iron – a material solution for modern diesel engine cylinder blocks and heads" (PDF). FoundryInfo-India.org. SinterCast, Sweden. February 2008. p. 3 of 7 (95). Archived from the original (PDF) on 26 July 2011.
"Boat engines from Volkswagen Marine – Self-study programme M002 – Design and Operation" (PDF). vw-m.de. Volkswagen AG. August 2006. Archived from the original (PDF) on 19 July 2011.
"Volkswagen Marine – engines for planing boats" (PDF). vw-m.de. Volkswagen AG. January 2009. Archived from the original (PDF) on 3 October 2011.
"TDI 225-6 – technical data". vw-m.de. Volkswagen AG. Archived from the original on 19 July 2011.
"TDI 265-6 – technical data". vw-m.de. Volkswagen AG. Archived from the original on 3 October 2011.
"Self Study Program 820133 The 3.0L V6 TDI Engine (Generation 2) Design and Function" (PDF). Volkswagen Group of America, Inc, Volkswagen Academy. 2013.

=== 3.0 V6 24v BiTDI CR 230 kW ===
DIN-rated power and torque outputs, applications, ID codes
230 kW (313 PS; 308 bhp) at 3,900 – 4,500 rpm; 650 N⋅m (479 lbf⋅ft) at 1,450 – 2,800 rpm, Audi A6, Audi A7, Audi SQ5 TDI (CGQB: pre-2014)
235 kW (320 PS; 315 bhp) at 3,900 – 4,500 rpm; 650 N⋅m (479 lbf⋅ft) at 1,450 – 2,800 rpm, Audi A6, Audi A7 (CVUA: 06/2014->)
240 kW (326 PS; 322 bhp) at 4,000 – 4,500 rpm; 650 N⋅m (479 lbf⋅ft) at 1,450 – 2,800 rpm, Audi A6, Audi SQ5, Audi A7 (CVUB: 06/2016->)
230 kW (313 PS; 308 bhp) at 3,850 – 4,500 rpm; 700 N⋅m (516 lbf⋅ft) at 2,500 – 3,100 rpm, Audi A6, Audi A7 (CVUC: 05/2012->)

references
ID & detail from ETKA
"New Audi A6 – in depth". WorldCarFans.com. Audi AG. 8 April 2004.
"New VW Touareg V6 TDI". WorldCarFans.com. 17 November 2004.
"Compacted Vermicular Cast Iron (GJV) for the Audi V6 diesel engine". ATZonline.com. GWV Fachverlage GmbH. October 2004.
"Compacted Graphite Iron – a material solution for modern diesel engine cylinder blocks and heads" (PDF). FoundryInfo-India.org. SinterCast, Sweden. February 2008. p. 3 of 7 (95). Archived from the original (PDF) on 26 July 2011.
"Boat engines from Volkswagen Marine – Self-study programme M002 – Design and Operation" (PDF). vw-m.de. Volkswagen AG. August 2006. Archived from the original (PDF) on 19 July 2011.
"Volkswagen Marine – engines for planing boats" (PDF). vw-m.de. Volkswagen AG. January 2009. Archived from the original (PDF) on 3 October 2011.
"TDI 225-6 – technical data". vw-m.de. Volkswagen AG. Archived from the original on 19 July 2011.
"TDI 265-6 – technical data". vw-m.de. Volkswagen AG. Archived from the original on 3 October 2011.

== 4.0-4.2 litre: 8 cylinder ==
=== 4.2 V8 TDI (Technically – 4.1 L) CR 235-257kW ===
This Audi engine is an entirely redeveloped and bored-out evolution of the superseded 4.0 V8 TDI CR, now with 90 mm (3.54 in) cylinder spacing between bore centres, and again with roller chain drive for the overhead camshafts and ancillaries. Just like its 4.0 V8 TDI predecessor, this all-new 4.2 V8 TDI retains the mantle of the world's highest power output car with a diesel V8. This engine is manufactured at Győr, Hungary by AUDI AG subsidiary Audi Hungaria Motor Kft.

identification
parts code prefix: 057.C
engine configuration & engine displacement
90° V8 engine, Turbocharged Direct Injection (TDI) turbodiesel; 4,134 cc (252.3 cu in); bore x stroke: 83.0 mm × 95.5 mm (3.27 in × 3.76 in), stroke ratio: 0.87:1 – undersquare/long-stroke, 516.7 cc per cylinder, 90 mm (3.54 in) cylinder spacing, compression ratio: 16.5:1, water-cooled alternator
cylinder block & crankcase
compacted vermicular graphite cast iron (GJV/CGI), 62 kg (137 lb); UV laser-honed exposed bore; cast reinforcing bed-plate lower frame incorporating five main bearings (each 'bearing' affixed by four bolts), die-forged chrome molybdenum alloy steel crossplane crankshaft with first and second order forces and moments avoided, three-part oil sump consisting of cast alloy upper section, a middle baffle section and pressed steel lower section, diagonally fracture-split connecting rods, cast aluminium alloy Kolbenschmidt pistons (Mahle on CCFA), simplex roller chain-driven ancillaries, oil filter module (incorporating oil separator and water-to-oil cooler) mounted within the 'vee' (externally mounted on Marine variants)
cylinder heads & valvetrain
cast aluminium alloy; four valves per cylinder, 32 valves total, operated by low-friction roller finger cam followers with automatic hydraulic valve clearance compensation, double overhead camshafts – the inlets driven in a relay method at the rear (flywheel) end of the engine by four simplex roller chains and the exhausts driven from the inlets by automatic slack adjusting spur gears at the front end, two unequal-length swirl-inducing switchable inlet ports, siamesed unequal-length exhaust ports
aspiration – automotive
two air filters, two hot-film air mass meters, 'biturbo': two water-cooled turbochargers with electrically direct-actuated Variable Turbine Geometry (VTG) vanes (one turbo per cylinder bank) operating up to 226,000 rpm with a maximum electrically regulated boost of 2.5 bar (36 psi), two side-mounted air-to-air fan-assisted (not on Q7) intercoolers (SMICs), two separate cast alloy intake manifolds interconnected by a "feedthrough" system to equalise the pressure in the two cylinder banks, two-position variable swirl flaps integrated into the intake tract. Engines introduced from 2014 include 2 variable geometry turbocharger with maximum 1.7 bar (25 psi) of relative boost pressure.
aspiration – Marine
air filter with hot-film air mass meter, one water-cooled turbocharger with electric boost pressure control mounted within the vee, sea-water tube intercooler, two separate cast alloy intake manifolds interconnected by a "feedthrough" system to equalise the pressure in the two cylinder banks, two-position variable swirl flaps integrated into the intake tract
fuel system & engine management
common rail (CR) direct diesel injection: electric low-pressure fuel lift pump, one timing belt-driven 1,600 bar (23,210 psi) injection pump, two common rail fuel rails (one per cylinder bank), piezo-electric operated fuel injectors with eight-hole nozzles for homogeneous fuel delivery, single and double pilot injection, up to four main injection actuations per piston cycle; Bosch EDC16 CP electronic engine control unit (ECU), Bosch MDC Marine Diesel Control on Marine variant. Engines introduced from 2014 has increased fuel pressure to 2,000 bar (29,008 psi).
exhaust system
two air-gap insulated fan-branch alloy steel exhaust manifolds, two close-coupled maintenance-free oxidizing catalytic converters, two silicon carbide diesel particulate filters, Euro4 emissions standard compliant
dimensions
length: 520 mm (20.5 in), mass: 255–257 kg (562–567 lb) (automotive – 15 kg (33 lb) lighter than its 4.0 V8 TDI predecessor, 4 kg (9 lb) lighter than the all-aluminium alloy Mercedes-Benz 4.0 V8 CDI diesel engine), 368 kg (811 lb) (Marine variant: dry weight, including DMF, cooling system & all ancillaries)
DIN-rated power & torque outputs, ID codes
BMC: 235 kW (320 PS; 315 bhp)
BVN: 240 kW (326 PS; 322 bhp) at 3,750 rpm; 650 N⋅m (479 lbf⋅ft) at 1,600-3,500 rpm
BTR: 240 kW (326 PS; 322 bhp) at 3,750 rpm; 760 N⋅m (561 lbf⋅ft) at 1,800-2,500 rpm
CCFA: 250 kW (340 PS; 335 bhp)
CEM: 257 kW (349 PS; 345 bhp) at 4,200 rpm; 800 N⋅m (590 lbf⋅ft) at 1,900 rpm
CTEC: 283 kW (385 PS; 380 bhp) at 3,750 rpm; 850 N⋅m (627 lbf⋅ft) at 2,000-2,750 rpm
applications
Audi D3 A8 4.2 TDI quattro (BMC: 01/05-06/05, BVN: 07/05->), Audi Q7 4.2 TDI (BTR: 03/07-06/09, CCFA: 06/09->), Volkswagen Marine TDI 350-8 (CEM: 02/09->), Volkswagen Touareg, Porsche Cayenne
references
"New Audi A8 4.2 TDI quattro". WorldCarFans.com. AUDI AG – press release. 19 May 2005.
"Audi A8 new engines in detail". WorldCarFans.com. AUDI AG – press release. 9 June 2005.
"Audi Q7 4.2 TDI in depth". WorldCarFans.com. AUDI AG – press release. 2 May 2007.
"Compacted Graphite Iron – a material solution for modern diesel engine cylinder blocks and heads" (PDF). FoundryInfo-India.org. SinterCast, Sweden. February 2008. p. 3 of 7 (95). Archived from the original (PDF) on 26 July 2011.
"Volkswagen Marine – engines for planing boats" (PDF). vw-m.de. Volkswagen AG. January 2009. Archived from the original (PDF) on 3 October 2011.
"TDI 350-8 – technical data". vw-m.de. Volkswagen AG. Archived from the original on 3 October 2011.
"Audi TDI Chronicle: 2014 4.2 TDI". Audi AG.

=== 4.0 V8 TDI 310-320kW ===
A successor to the 4.2 TDI. The engine includes 2 turbochargers, 48-volt electrical system, 7 kW electric compressor, Bosch CRS 3.25 engine management.

A turbocharger serves to supply engine boost and spools up the passive turbocharger.

identification
parts code prefix: EA 898
engine configuration & engine displacement
90° V8 engine, Turbocharged Direct Injection (TDI) turbodiesel; 3,956 cc (241.4 cu in); bore x stroke: 83.0 mm × 91.4 mm (3.27 in × 3.60 in), stroke ratio: 0.91:1 – undersquare/long-stroke, 494.5 cc per c[ylinder, 90 mm (3.54 in) cylinder spacing, compression ratio: 16.0:1, water-cooled alternator

==== DIN-rated power and torque outputs, applications, ID codes ====
310 kW (421 PS; 416 bhp) at 3,500-5,000 rpm; 850 N⋅m (627 lbf⋅ft) at 1,000-3,250 rpm, Porsche Panamera II 4S Diesel (2016–2018)

320 kW (435 PS; 429 bhp) at 3,750-5,000 rpm; 900 N⋅m (664 lbf⋅ft) at 1,000-3,250 rpm, Audi SQ7 (2016–2020), Audi SQ8 (2019–2020), Audi A8 D5 (2013–2017), Bentley Bentayga (2017–2020), Volkswagen Touareg (2018–2021)

==== Production ====
The engine was developed in Ingolstadt.

== 4.9 litre: 10 cylinders ==
=== 4.9 V10 20V TDI PD 230kW ===
identification
engine code: AJS
engine configuration & engine displacement
90° V10 engine, Turbocharged Direct Injection (TDI) turbodiesel; 4,921 cc (300.3 cu in); bore x stroke: 81.0 mm × 95.5 mm (3.19 in × 3.76 in), 492.1 cc per cylinder
DIN-rated power & torque output, ID code
230 kW (313 PS; 308 bhp) at 3,750 rpm – 46.7 kW (63.5 PS; 62.6 bhp) per liter; 750 N⋅m (553 lbf⋅ft) at 2,000 rpm
applications
Volkswagen Touareg V10 TDI (2002-2008)
Volkswagen Phaeton V10 TDI 4motion (2003-2007)

== 5.9 litre: 12 cylinders ==
=== 5.9 V12 48V TDI CR DPF 368kW ===
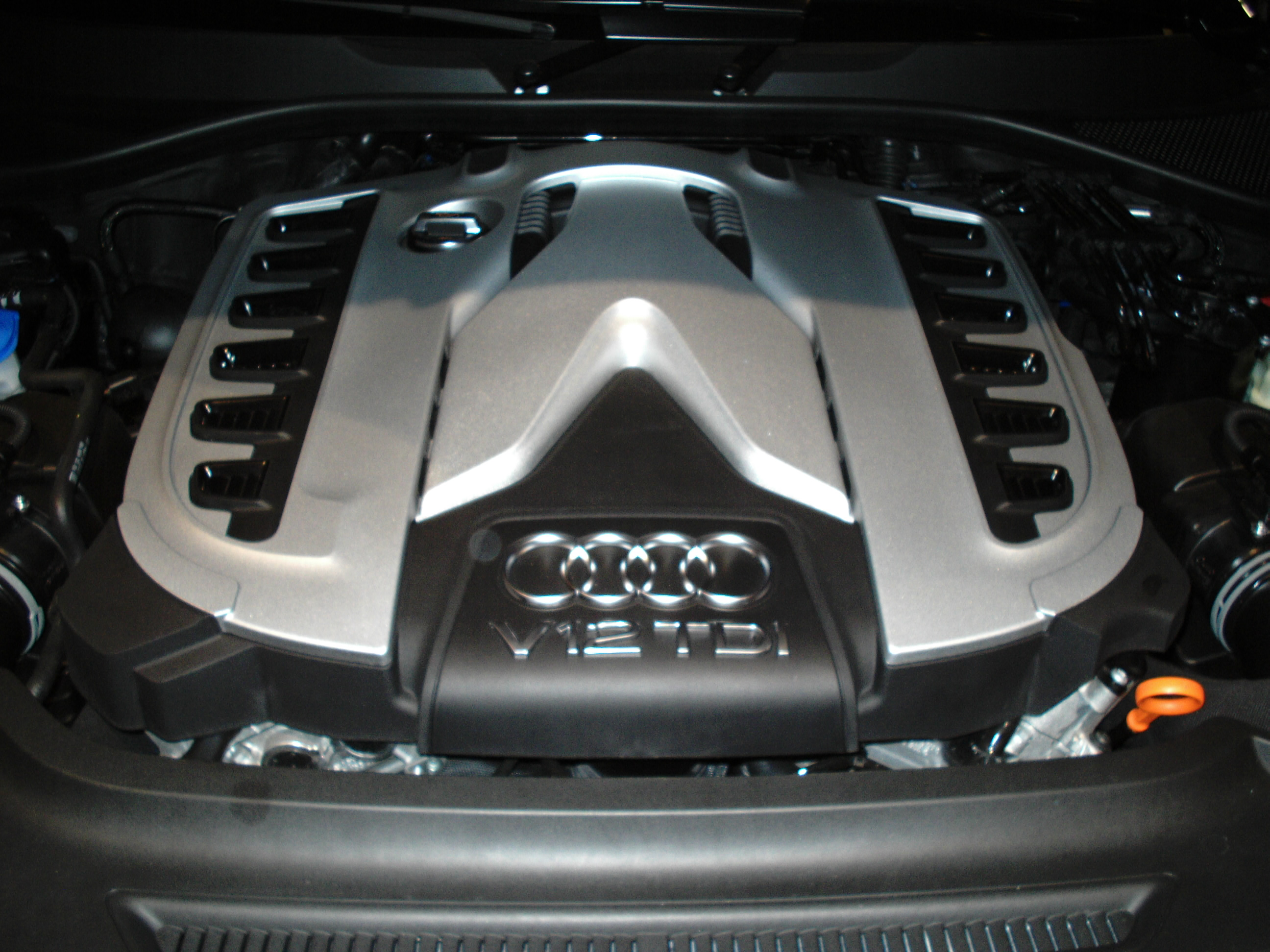
Front view of the installed V12 TDI engine in the Audi Q7 V12 TDI quattro

identification
parts code prefix: 05A
engine configuration & engine displacement
60° V12 engine, Turbocharged Direct Injection (TDI) turbodiesel; 5,934 cc (362.1 cu in); bore x stroke: 83.0 mm × 91.4 mm (3.27 in × 3.60 in), stroke ratio: 0.91:1 – undersquare/long-stroke, 494.5 cc per cylinder; 90 mm (3.54 in) cylinder spacing; 17 mm (0.67 in) cylinder bank offset; compression ratio: 16.0:1; two oil coolers (one: water/oil, the other: air/oil); four coolant radiators; water-cooled alternator
cylinder block & crankcase
GJV-450 compacted vermicular graphite cast iron (GJV/CGI); nodular graphite reinforced cast iron bedplate frame with seven main bearings and four bolts per bearing, die-forged chrome and molybdenum steel alloy crossplane crankshaft, diagonally fracture-cracked forged connecting rods, aluminium forged Mahle pistons, two-part cast aluminium alloy baffled oil sump
cylinder heads & valvetrain
composite lower section made from low-pressure die cast aluminium alloy with integrated intake and exhaust ports, middle section for guiding engine oil flow, and the top section is a pressure-cast ladder frame for the overhead camshafts; four valves per cylinder, 48 valves total, low-friction roller finger cam followers with automatic hydraulic valve clearance compensation, double overhead camshaft – the exhaust camshafts driven from the flywheel side via a two-stage chain drive utilising three 3/8" simplex roller chains, and the inlet camshafts driven from the exhaust camshafts by gears at the front of the engine; two unequal-length swirl-inducing switchable inlet ports, siamesed unequal-length exhaust ports
aspiration
two air filters, two hot-film air mass meters; 'biturbo': two water-cooled turbochargers with electrically controlled Variable Turbine Geometry (VTG) (one turbo per cylinder bank) and an electronically regulated boost pressure of up to 2.6 bar (38 psi), two all-alloy side-mounted intercoolers; cast alloy intake manifold with dual adjustable turbulence flaps
fuel system & engine management
Bosch 2,000 bar (29,010 psi) common rail (CR) (one rail per cylinder bank) direct injection: with two chain-driven high-pressure fuel pumps, fuel cooler for return line, twelve combustion chamber-sited eight-hole (0.12 mm (0.0047 in)) piezo injectors with multi-pulse injection (up to five injection operations per piston cycle, including pre- and post- ignition injection); two Bosch EDC electronic engine control units (ECUs) working on the 'master and slave' concept; water-cooled vacuum-actuated exhaust gas recirculation (EGR) with up to 50% recirculation rate at partial engine load; European Euro5 emissions standard compliant
exhaust system
double flow exhaust pipes with two catalysts and two diesel particulate filters (DPF); two lambda sensors, two exhaust gas temperature sensors
dimensions
length: 684 mm (26.9 in) (just 166 mm (6.5 in) longer than the V8 TDI),
DIN-rated power & torque output, ID code
368 kW (500 PS; 493 bhp) at 4,000 rpm – 62.0 kW (84.3 PS; 83.1 bhp) per litre; 1,000 N⋅m (738 lbf⋅ft) at 1,750-3,000 rpm — CCGA
application
Audi Q7 V12 TDI quattro (09/08->)
references
"The World's most powerful diesel passenger car". AudiWorld.com. AUDI AG. 11 September 2006. Archived from the original on 3 November 2006.
"Audi introduces V12 diesel passenger car concept (with images)". GreenCarCongress.com. BioAge Group, LLC. 7 January 2007.
"The ultimate high-performance SUV – the new Audi Q7 V12 TDI quattro". Audi-MediaServices.com. AUDI AG – press release. 2 March 2008.
"Compacted Graphite Iron – a material solution for modern diesel engine cylinder blocks and heads" (PDF). FoundryInfo-India.org. SinterCast, Sweden. February 2008. p. 3 of 7 (95). Archived from the original (PDF) on 26 July 2011.

== Scania truck engines ==
=== 8.9 EU4 169-228kW ===
engine configuration & engine displacement
inline five-cylinder, turbodiesel; 8.9 L (543 cu in)
aspiration
turbocharger, intercooler
fuel system & engine management
Scania PDE (German: Pumpe-Düse-Einspritzung) high-pressure Unit Injector direct injection system, exhaust gas recirculation, Euro4 compliant
DIN-rated power & torque outputs
169 kW (230 PS; 227 bhp) at 1,800 rpm; 1,050 N⋅m (774 lbf⋅ft) at 1,100-1,500 rpm
198 kW (269 PS; 266 bhp) at 1,800 rpm; 1,150 N⋅m (848 lbf⋅ft) at 1,100-1,450 rpm
228 kW (310 PS; 306 bhp) at 1,800 rpm; 1,550 N⋅m (1,143 lbf⋅ft) at 1,100-1,350 rpm
applications
Scania trucks
reference
"Scania Euro4, 9-litre". Scania.co.uk. Scania (Great Britain) Limited.

=== 9.3 EU5 169-235kW ===
engine configuration & engine displacement
inline five-cylinder, turbodiesel; 9.3 L (568 cu in)
aspiration
Variable Turbine Geometry (VTG) variable-vane turbocharger, intercooler
fuel system & engine management
Cummins / Scania XPI extra-high-pressure common rail direct injection, exhaust gas recirculation, diesel particulate filter, Euro5 compliant
DIN-rated power & torque outputs
169 kW (230 PS; 227 bhp) at 1,900 rpm; 1,050 N⋅m (774 lbf⋅ft) at 1,000-1,500 rpm
206 kW (280 PS; 276 bhp) at 1,900 rpm; 1,400 N⋅m (1,033 lbf⋅ft) at 1,000-1,350 rpm
235 kW (320 PS; 315 bhp) at 1,900 rpm; 1,600 N⋅m (1,180 lbf⋅ft) at 1,100-1,200 rpm
applications
Scania trucks
references
"Scania Euro5, 9-litre". Scania.co.uk. Scania (Great Britain) Limited. Archived from the original on 28 April 2009.
"Fuel Systems – Extreme Pressure Injection (XPI) System". Cummins.com. Cummins Inc. Archived from the original on 20 July 2009.

=== 11.7 DC12/DT12 EU4 250-353kW ===
engine configuration & engine displacement
inline six-cylinder, turbodiesel; 11.7 L (714 cu in)
aspiration
turbocharger, intercooler
fuel system & engine management
Cummins / Scania HPI high-pressure Unit Injector direct injection system, exhaust gas recirculation, Euro4 compliant
DIN-rated power & torque outputs
250 kW (340 PS; 335 bhp) at 1,800 rpm; 1,700 N⋅m (1,254 lbf⋅ft) at 1,100-1,350 rpm
280 kW (381 PS; 375 bhp) at 1,800 rpm; 1,900 N⋅m (1,401 lbf⋅ft) at 1,100-1,350 rpm
309 kW (420 PS; 414 bhp) at 1,900 rpm; 2,100 N⋅m (1,549 lbf⋅ft) at 1,100-1,350 rpm
353 kW (480 PS; 473 bhp) at 1,900 rpm; 2,250 N⋅m (1,660 lbf⋅ft) at 1,100-1,450 rpm
applications
Scania trucks
references
"Scania Euro4, 12-litre". Scania.co.uk. Scania (Great Britain) Limited.
"Fuel Systems – High Pressure Injection (HPI) Systems". Cummins.com. Cummins Inc. Archived from the original on 20 July 2009.

=== 11.7 DC12 EU5 280-309kW ===
engine configuration & engine displacement
inline six-cylinder, turbodiesel; 11.7 L (714 cu in)
aspiration
turbocharger, intercooler
fuel system & engine management
Cummins / Scania HPI high-pressure Unit Injector direct injection, Scania selective catalytic reduction (SCR) – catalytic converter with AdBlue urea injection, Euro5 compliant
DIN-rated power & torque outputs
280 kW (381 PS; 375 bhp) at 1,800 rpm; 1,900 N⋅m (1,401 lbf⋅ft) at 1,100-1,400 rpm
309 kW (420 PS; 414 bhp) at 1,800 rpm; 2,100 N⋅m (1,549 lbf⋅ft) at 1,000-1,400 rpm
applications
Scania trucks
references
"Scania Euro5, 12-litre". Scania.co.uk. Scania (Great Britain) Limited. Archived from the original on 28 April 2009.
"Fuel Systems – High Pressure Injection (HPI) Systems". Cummins.com. Cummins Inc. Archived from the original on 20 July 2009.

=== 12.7 DC13 EU5 265-353kW ===
engine configuration & engine displacement
inline six-cylinder, turbodiesel; 12.7 L (775 cu in)
aspiration
variable-vane geometry turbocharger (VGT), intercooler
fuel system & engine management
Cummins / Scania XPI extra-high-pressure common rail direct injection, two-way exhaust gas recirculation, Euro5 compliant
DIN-rated power & torque outputs
265 kW (360 PS; 355 bhp) at 1,900 rpm; 1,850 N⋅m (1,364 lbf⋅ft) at 1,000-1,300 rpm
294 kW (400 PS; 394 bhp) at 1,900 rpm; 2,100 N⋅m (1,549 lbf⋅ft) at 1,000-1,300 rpm
324 kW (441 PS; 434 bhp) at 1,900 rpm; 2,300 N⋅m (1,696 lbf⋅ft) at 1,000-1,300 rpm
353 kW (480 PS; 473 bhp) at 1,900 rpm; 2,500 N⋅m (1,844 lbf⋅ft) at 1,000-1,300 rpm
applications
Scania trucks
references
"Scania Euro5, 13-litre". Scania.co.uk. Scania (Great Britain) Limited. Archived from the original on 28 April 2009.
"Fuel Systems – Extreme Pressure Injection (XPI) System". Cummins.com. Cummins Inc. Archived from the original on 20 July 2009.

=== 15.6 V8 DC16 368-544kW ===
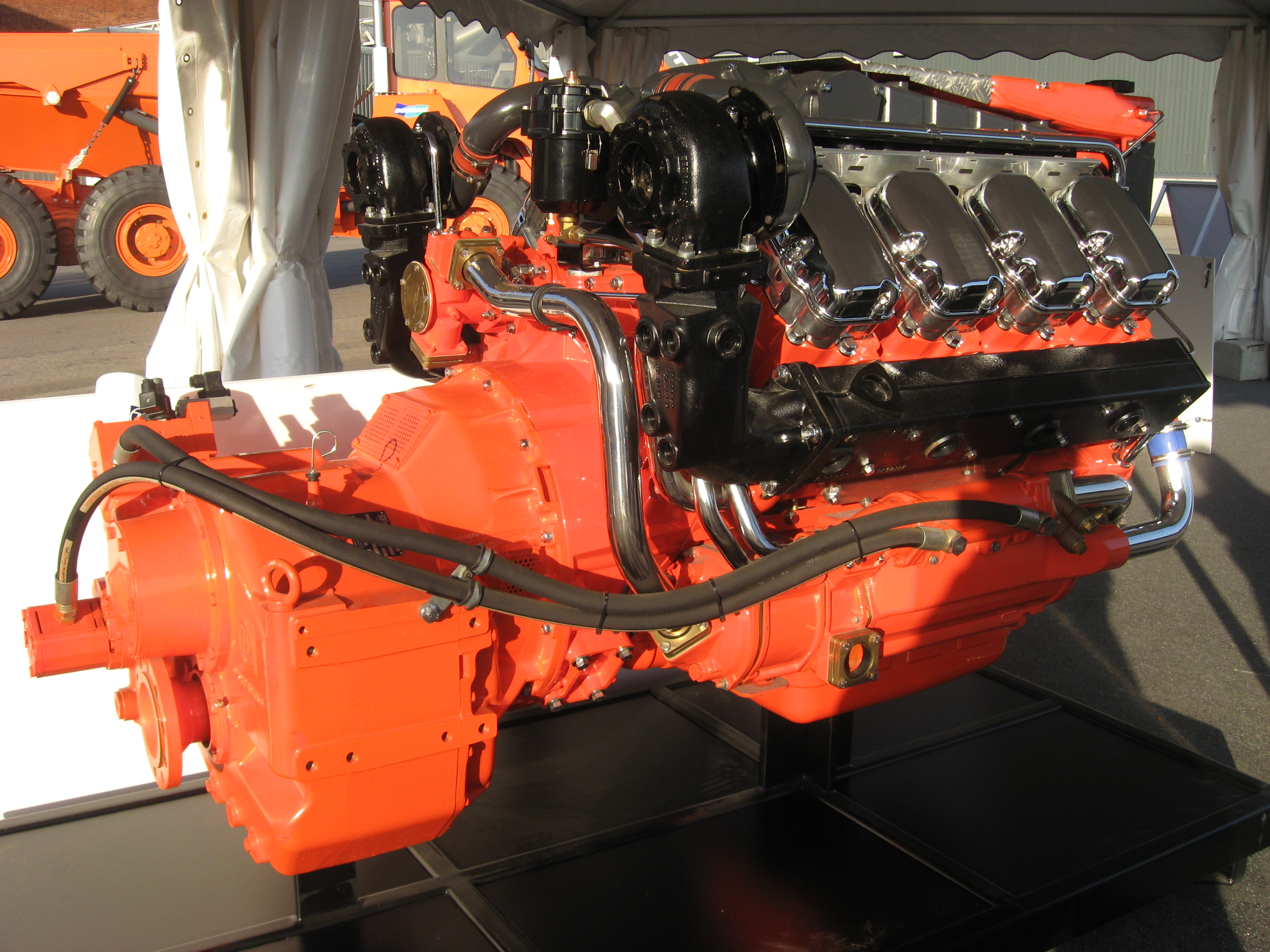
Scania V8 16-litre marine engine with reverse.

engine configuration & engine displacement
90° V8 engine, turbodiesel; 15,607 cc (952.4 cu in); bore x stroke: 127.0 mm × 154.0 mm (5.00 in × 6.06 in), stroke ratio: 0.82:1 – undersquare/long-stroke, 1,950.8 cc per cylinder
aspiration
turbocharger, intercooler
fuel system & engine management
Scania PDE high-pressure Unit Injector system, Scania selective catalytic reduction (SCR) – catalytic converter with AdBlue urea injection
DIN-rated power & torque outputs – Euro4
368 kW (500 PS; 493 bhp) at 1,900 rpm; 2,400 N⋅m (1,770 lbf⋅ft) at 1,100-1,400 rpm
412 kW (560 PS; 553 bhp) at 1,900 rpm; 2,700 N⋅m (1,991 lbf⋅ft) at 1,100-1,400 rpm
456 kW (620 PS; 612 bhp) at 1,900 rpm; 3,000 N⋅m (2,213 lbf⋅ft) at 1,100-1,400 rpm
DIN-rated power & torque outputs – Euro5
368 kW (500 PS; 493 bhp) at 1,800 rpm; 2,500 N⋅m (1,844 lbf⋅ft) at 1,000-1,350 rpm
412 kW (560 PS; 553 bhp) at 1,900 rpm; 2,700 N⋅m (1,991 lbf⋅ft) at 1,000-1,400 rpm
456 kW (620 PS; 612 bhp) at 1,900 rpm; 3,000 N⋅m (2,213 lbf⋅ft) at 1,000-1,400 rpm
544 kW (740 PS; 730 bhp) at 2,000 rpm; 3,600 N⋅m (2,655 lbf⋅ft) at 1,000-1,400 rpm reference: https://web.archive.org/web/20121112032602/http://www3.scania.com/en/New-V8-truck-range/The-new-730hp-engine/
applications
Scania trucks
references
"Scania Euro4, 16-litre". Scania.co.uk. Scania (Great Britain) Limited.
"Scania Euro5, 16-litre". Scania.co.uk. Scania (Great Britain) Limited. Archived from the original on 28 April 2009.

== Data table ==
The following table contains a selection of current and historical Volkswagen Group compression-ignition diesel engines for comparison of performance and operating characteristics:

engine model	engine disp.: (cc)	engine config.	valvetrain	max. power: kW (PS)	rpm for max. power	torque at max. power: Nm	max. torque: Nm (lb·ft)	rpm for max. torque	power at max. torque: kW	specific power: kW/L (PS/L)	max MEP: bar	MEP at max. power: bar	max operating revs: rpm	dates installed (all unless PS stated in 1st col.)
1.2 TDI 3L	1,191	inline 3 (R3)	6v SOHC	45 (61)	4,000	107	140 (103)	1,800- 2,400	26-35	37.8 (51.2)	14.8	11.3		06/1999- 08/2005
1.4 TDI	1,422	inline 3 (R3)	6v SOHC	59 (80)	4,000	141	195 (144)	2,200	45	41.5 (56.3)	17.2	12.4		05/1999- present
1.6 TDI CR	1,598	inline 4 (R4)	16v DOHC	85 (116)	4,400	184	250 (184)	2,000- 2,500	31-65	53.2 (72.6)	19.7	14.5		??/????- present
1.7 D	1,716	inline 4 (R4)	8v SOHC	42 (57)	4,500	89	103 (76)	2,800	30	24.5 (33.2)	7.5	6.5		10/1986- 05/1992
1.7 SDI	1,716	inline 4 (R4)	8v SOHC	44 (60)	4,200	100	115 (85)	2,200	26	25.6 (35.0)	8.4	7.3		??/????- ??/????
1.9 D	1,896	inline 4 (R4)	8v SOHC	47 (64)	4,300	104	124 (91)	2,500- 3,200	33-42	24.8 (33.8)	8.2	6.9		??/????- present
1.9 SD	1,896	inline 4 (R4)	8v SOHC	36 (49)	3,000	115	121 (89)	1,800	23	19.0 (25.8)	8	7.6		??/????- present
1.9 SDI	1,896	inline 4 (R4)	8v SOHC	50 (68)	4,000	119	133 (98)	1,800	25	26.4 (35.9)	8.8	7.9		07/1995- present
1.9 TD	1,896	inline 4 (R4)	8v SOHC	55 (75)	4,200	125	150 (111)	2,000	31	29.0 (39.6)	9.9	8.3		
1.9 TDI	1,896	inline 4 (R4)	8v SOHC	66 (90)	3,750	168	210 (155)	1,900	42	34.8 (47.5)	13.9	11.1		09/1991- present
1.9 TDI PD	1,896	inline 4 (R4)	8v SOHC	110 (150)	4,000	229	320 (236)	1,900	58	58.2 (78)	20.5	15.2	5200	01/1998- present
2.0 SDI PD	1,968	inline 4 (R4)	8v SOHC	55 (75)	4,200	125	140 (103)	2,400	35	27.9 (38.1)	8.9	8		
2.0 TDI PD; 140 PS	1,968	inline 4 (R4)	8v DOHC	103 (140)	4,000	246	320 (236)	1,800	60	52.3 (71.1)	20.4	15.7		
2.0 TDI PD 16v 170 PS	1,968	inline 4 (R4)	16v DOHC	125 (170)	4,200	284	350 (258)	1,800- 2,500	66-92	63.5 (86.4)	22.3	18.1		
2.0 TDI CR; 240 PS	1,968	inline 4 (R4)	16v DOHC	176 (240)	4,000	420	500 (370)	1,750- 2,500	92-131	89.4 (122)	31.9	26.8		
2.5 R5 SDI; 75 PS	2,461	inline 5 (R5)	10v SOHC	55 (75)	3,600	146	155 (114)	2,250	37	22.3 (30.5)	7.9	7.4		05/1996- present
2.5 R5 TDI CR	2,461	inline 5 (R5)	10v SOHC	120 (163)	3,500	327	350 (258)	2,000	73	48.8 (66.3)	17.9	16.7		
2.5 R5 TDI PD	2,461	inline 5 (R5)	10v SOHC	128 (174)	3,500	349	400 (295)	2,000	84	52.0 (70.7)	20.4	17.8		
2.7 V6 TDI	2,698	V6 engine	24v DOHC	132 (179)	3,300- 4,250	382-297	380 (280)	1,400- 3,300	56-131	48.9 (66.3)	17.7	17.8		11/2004- present
3.0 V6 TDI; 204 PS	2,967	V6 engine	24v DOHC	150 (204)	3,500	409	450 (332)	1,400	66	50.6 (68.8)	19.1	17.3		11/2004- 03/2009
3.0 V6 TDI; 232 PS	2,967	V6 engine	24v DOHC	171 (232)	4,000	408	500 (369)	1,750	92	57.6 (78.2)	21.2	17.3		01/2004- 09/2014
3.0 V6 24v BiTDI CR; 320 PS	2,967	V6 engine	24v DOHC	235 (320)	3,900-4,500	575-499	650 (479)	1,450 – 2,800	99-191	79.2 (107.9)	27.5	24.4		06/2014- present
3.3 V8 TDI	3,328	V8 engine	32v DOHC	165 (224)	4,000	394	480 (354)	1,800- 3,000	90-151	49.6 (67.3)	18.1	14.9		12/1999- 09/2002
4.0 V8 TDI	3,936	V8 engine	32v DOHC	202 (275)	3,750	514	650 (479)	1,800- 2,500	123-170	51.3 (69.9)	20.8	16.4		05/2003- 07/2005
4.2 V8 TDI	4,134	V8 engine	32v DOHC	257 (349)	4,200	584	800 (590)	1,900	159	62.2 (84.4)	24.3	17.8		01/2005- present
4.0 V8 TDI	3,956	V8 engine	32v DOHC	320 (435)	3,750-5,000	900	664	1,000-3,250						05/2016- present
5.0 V10 TDI; 351 PS	4,921	V10 engine	20v SOHC	258 (351)	3,500	704	850 (627)	2,000	178	52.4 (71.3)	21.7	18		11/2002- present
6.0 V12 TDI CR; DPF (Audi Q7)	5,934	V12 engine	48v DOHC	368 (500)	4,000	879	1,000 (738)	1,750- 3,000	183-314	62.0 (84.3)	21.2	18.6		09/2008- present
engine model	engine disp.: (cc / cc)	engine config.	valvetrain	max. power: kW (PS)	rpm for max. power	torque at max. power: Nm	max. torque: Nm (lb·ft)	rpm for max. torque	power at max. torque: kW	specific power: kW/L (PS/L)	max MEP: bar	MEP at max. power: bar	max operating revs: rpm	dates installed (all unless PS stated in 1st col.)

== See also ==
- List of Volkswagen Group petrol engines
- G-Lader
- G60 – for detailed development info and progression of forced induction in Volkswagen Group engines
- List of engines used in Chrysler products
