= Parts book =

Catalog published by manufacturers

A parts book, parts catalogue or illustrated part catalogue is a book published by a manufacturer which contains the illustrations, part numbers and other relevant data for their products or parts thereof.

Parts books were often issued as microfiche since the 1970s, though this has fallen out of favour. Now, many manufacturers offer this information digitally in an electronic parts catalogue. This can be locally installed software, or a centrally hosted web application. Usually, an electronic parts catalogue enables the user to virtually disassemble the product into its components to identify the required part(s).

In the automotive industry, electronic parts catalogues are also able to access specific vehicle information, usually through an online look-up of the vehicle identification number. This will identify specific models, allowing the user to correctly identify the required part and its relevant part number.

== See also ==
- ETKA
- Product information management
- Parts locator
- Electronic Parts Catalogue (EPC)
