= Horsepower =

Unit of power

- One imperial horsepower lifts 550 pounds (250 kg) by 1 foot (30 cm) in 1 second.

General information
- Unit of: power
- Symbol: hp

Horsepower (hp) is a unit of measurement of power, or the rate at which work is done, usually in reference to the output of engines or motors. There are many different standards and types of horsepower. Two common definitions in use are the imperial horsepower, abbreviated hp or bhp, which is about 745.7 watts, and the metric horsepower, also represented as cv or PS, which is approximately 735.5 watts. The electric horsepower, hpE, is exactly 746 watts, while the boiler horsepower is 9809.5 or 9811 watts, depending on the exact year.

The term was adopted in the late 18th century by Scottish engineer James Watt to compare the output of steam engines with the power of draft horses. It was later expanded to include the output power of other power-generating machinery such as piston engines, turbines, and electric motors. The definition of the unit varied among geographical regions. Most countries now use the SI unit watt for measurement of power. With the implementation of the EU Directive 80/181/EEC on 1 January 2010, the use of horsepower in the EU is permitted only as a supplementary unit.

== History ==
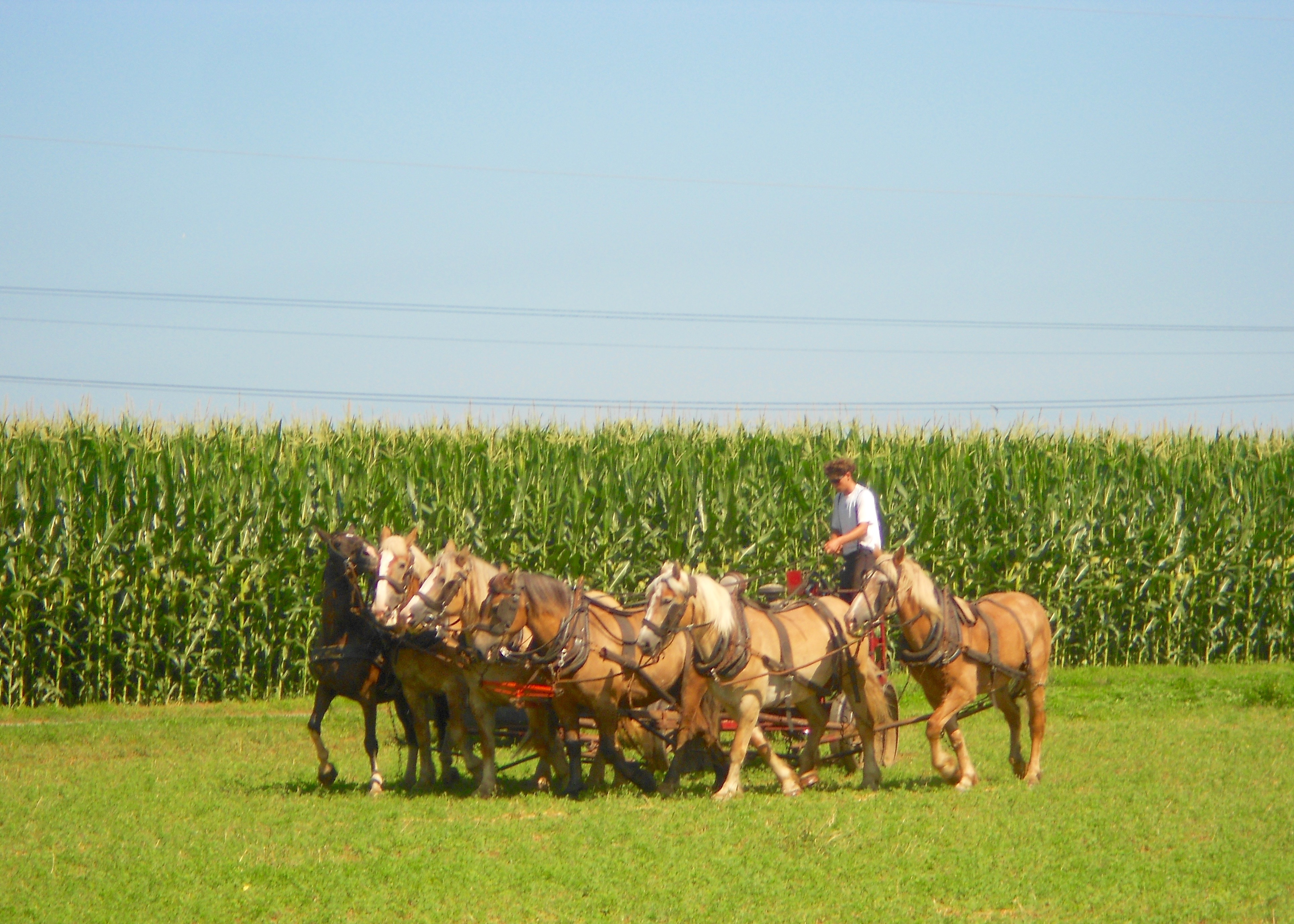
A team of six horses mowing hay in East Lampeter Township, Pennsylvania, U.S.

The development of the steam engine provided a reason to compare the output of horses with that of the engines that could replace them. In 1702, Thomas Savery wrote in The Miner's Friend:

So that an engine which will raise as much water as two horses, working together at one time in such a work, can do, and for which there must be constantly kept ten or twelve horses for doing the same. Then I say, such an engine may be made large enough to do the work required in employing eight, ten, fifteen, or twenty horses to be constantly maintained and kept for doing such a work ...

The idea was later used by James Watt to help market the Watt steam engine, an improved Newcomen steam engine. He had previously agreed to take royalties of one-third of the savings in coal from the older Newcomen steam engines. This royalty scheme did not work with customers who did not have existing steam engines but used horses instead.

Watt determined that a horse could turn a mill wheel 144 times in an hour (or 2.4 times a minute). The wheel was 12 feet (3.7 m) in radius; therefore, the horse travelled 2.4 × 2π × 12 feet in one minute. Watt judged that the horse could pull with a force of 180 pounds-force (800 N). So:

Engineering in History recounts that John Smeaton initially estimated that a horse could produce 22,916 ft⋅lb (31,070 J) per minute. John Desaguliers had previously suggested 44,000 ft⋅lb (59,700 J) per minute, and Thomas Tredgold suggested 27,500 ft⋅lb (37,300 J) per minute. "Watt found by experiment in 1782 that a 'brewery horse' could produce 32,400 ft⋅lb [43,929 J] per minute." James Watt and Matthew Boulton standardized that figure at 33,000 ft⋅lb (44,742.0 J) per minute the next year.

A common legend states that the unit was created when one of Watt's first customers, a brewer, specifically demanded an engine that would match a horse, and chose the strongest horse he had and driving it to the limit. In that legend, Watt accepted the challenge and built a machine that was actually even stronger than the figure achieved by the brewer, and the output of that machine became the horsepower.

In 1993, R. D. Stevenson and R. J. Wassersug published correspondence in Nature summarizing measurements and calculations of peak and sustained work rates of a horse. Citing measurements made at the 1925 Iowa State Fair, they reported that the peak power over a few seconds has been measured to be as high as 14.88 hp (11.10 kW) and also observed that for sustained activity, a work rate of about 1 hp (0.75 kW) per horse is consistent with agricultural advice from both the 19th and 20th centuries and also consistent with a work rate of about four times the basal rate expended by other vertebrates for sustained activity.

When considering human-powered equipment, a healthy human can produce about 1.2 hp (0.89 kW) briefly (see orders of magnitude) and sustain about 0.1 hp (0.07 kW) indefinitely; trained athletes can manage up to about 2.5 hp (2 kW) briefly and 0.35 hp (0.26 kW) for a period of several hours. The Jamaican sprinter Usain Bolt produced a maximum of 3.5 hp (2.6 kW) 0.89 seconds into his 9.58 second 100-metre (109.4 yd) sprint world record in 2009.

In 2023 a group of engineers modified a dynamometer to be able to measure how much power a horse can produce. This horse was measured to 5.7 hp (4.3 kW).

== Calculating power ==
When torque T is in pound-foot units, rotational speed N is in rpm, the resulting power in horsepower is

$$\{P\}_\mathrm{hp} = \frac{\{T\}_\mathrm{ft {\cdot} lbf} \{N\}_\mathrm{rpm}}{5252}.$$

The constant 5252 is the rounded value of (33,000 ft⋅lbf/min)/(2π rad/rev).

When torque T is in inch-pounds,

$$\{P\}_\mathrm{hp} = \frac{\{T\}_\mathrm{in {\cdot} lbf} \{N\}_\mathrm{rpm}}{63{,}025}.$$

The constant 63,025 is the approximation of

$$33{,}000~\frac{\text{ft} {\cdot} \text{lbf}}{\text{min}} \times \frac{12~\frac{\text{in}}{\text{ft}}}{2\pi~\text{rad}} \approx 63{,}025 \frac{\text{in} {\cdot} \text{lbf}}{\text{min}}.$$

== Definitions ==
=== Imperial horsepower ===
Assuming the third CGPM (1901, CR 70) definition of standard gravity, g_{n} = 9.80665 m/s^{2}, is used to define the pound-force as well as the kilogram force, and the international avoirdupois pound (1959), one imperial horsepower is:

1 hp	≡ 33,000 ft·lbf/min	by definition
	= 550 ft⋅lbf/s	since	1 min = 60 s
	= 550 × 0.3048 × 0.45359237 m⋅kgf/s	since	1 ft ≡ 0.3048 m and 1 lb ≡ 0.45359237 kg
	= 76.0402249068 kg_{f}⋅m/s
	= 76.0402249068 × 9.80665 kg⋅m^{2}/s^{3}	since	g = 9.80665 m/s^{2}
	= 745.69987158227022 W ≈ 745.700 W	since	1 W ≡ 1 J/s = 1 N⋅m/s = 1 (kg⋅m/s^{2})⋅(m/s)

Or given that 1 hp = 550 ft⋅lbf/s, 1 ft = 0.3048 m, 1 lbf ≈ 4.448 N, 1 J = 1 N⋅m, 1 W = 1 J/s: 1 hp ≈ 745.7 W

=== Metric horsepower (PS, KM, cv, hk, pk, k, ks, ch) ===
One metric horsepower is needed to lift 75 kilograms by 1 metre in 1 second.

The various units used to indicate this definition (PS, KM, cv, hk, pk, k, ks and ch) all translate to horsepower in English. British manufacturers often intermix metric horsepower and mechanical horsepower depending on the origin of the engine in question.

DIN 66036 defines one metric horsepower (Pferdestärke, or PS) as the power to raise a mass of 75 kilograms against the Earth's gravitational force over a distance of one metre in one second: 75 kg × 9.80665 m/s^{2} × 1 m / 1 s = 75 kgf⋅m/s = 1 PS. This is equivalent to 735.49875 W, or 98.6% of an imperial horsepower. In 1972, the PS was replaced by the kilowatt as the official power-measuring unit in EEC directives.

Other names for the metric horsepower are the Italian cavallo vapore (cv), Dutch paardenkracht (pk), the French cheval-vapeur (ch), the Spanish caballo de vapor and Portuguese cavalo-vapor (cv), the Russian лошадиная сила (л. с.), the Swedish hästkraft (hk), the Danish and Norwegian hestekraft (hk), the Finnish hevosvoima (hv), the Estonian hobujõud (hj), the Hungarian lóerő (LE), the Czech koňská síla and Slovak konská sila (k or ks), the Serbo-Croatian konjska snaga (KS), the Bulgarian конска сила, the Macedonian коњска сила (KC), the Polish koń mechaniczny (KM) (lit. 'mechanical horse'), Slovenian konjska moč (KM), the Ukrainian кінська сила (к. с.), the Romanian cal-putere (CP), and the German Pferdestärke (PS).

In the 19th century, revolutionary-era France had its own unit used to replace the cheval vapeur (horsepower); based on a 100 kgf⋅m/s standard, it was called the poncelet and was abbreviated p.

=== Tax horsepower ===
Tax, or fiscal, horsepower is a non-linear rating of a motor vehicle for tax purposes. Tax-horsepower ratings were originally more or less directly related to engine displacements, but, as of 2000, many countries have changed over to systems based on CO_{2} emissions so the current systems are not directly comparable to old tax horsepower. The Citroën 2CV is named for its French fiscal horsepower rating, deux chevaux (2CV).

=== Electrical horsepower ===
Nameplates on electrical motors show their available shaft power output, not the electrical power input. This power output is ordinarily stated in watts or kilowatts. In the United States, the power output is stated in horsepower.

=== Hydraulic horsepower ===
Hydraulic horsepower can be the power available within hydraulic machinery or power through the down-hole nozzle of a drilling rig, or it can be used as an estimate of the mechanical power needed to generate a given hydraulic flow rate.

It may be calculated as
$$\{P\}_\text{hp} = \frac{\{p\}_\text{psi} \{Q\}_\text{USgal/min}}{1714},$$
where power $(P)$ is in horsepower, pressure $(p)$ is in psi and flow rate $(Q)$ is in US gallons per minute.

Drilling rigs are powered mechanically by rotating the bit from above. Hydraulic power is still needed, though, as 1500 to 5000 W are required to push mud through the drill bit to clear waste rock. Additional hydraulic power may also be used to drive a down-hole mud motor to power directional drilling.

When using SI units, the equation becomes coherent and there is no dividing constant.

$$P = p Q,$$
where power $(P)$ is in watts, pressure $(p)$ is in pascals (Pa), and flow rate $(Q)$ is in cubic metres per second (m^{3}/s).

=== Boiler horsepower ===
Boiler horsepower is a boiler's capacity to deliver steam to a steam engine and is not the same unit of power as the 550 ft⋅lb/s definition. One boiler horsepower is equal to the thermal energy rate required to evaporate 34.5 pounds (15.6 kg) of fresh water at 212 °F (100 °C) in one hour. In the early days of steam use, the boiler horsepower was roughly comparable to the horsepower of engines fed by the boiler.

The term boiler horsepower was originally developed at the Philadelphia Centennial Exhibition in 1876, where the best steam engines of that period were tested. The average steam consumption of those engines (per output horsepower) was determined to be the evaporation of 30 pounds (14 kg) of water per hour, based on feed water at 100 °F (38 °C), and saturated steam generated at 70 psi (480 kPa). This original definition is equivalent to a boiler heat output of 33,485 Btu/h (9.813 kW). A few years later in 1884, the ASME redefined the boiler horsepower as the thermal output equal to the evaporation of 34.5 pounds per hour of water "from and at" 212 °F (100 °C). This considerably simplified boiler testing, and provided more accurate comparisons of the boilers at that time. This revised definition is equivalent to a boiler heat output of 33,469 Btu/h (9.809 kW). Present industrial practice is to define boiler horsepower as a boiler thermal output equal to 33,475 Btu/h (9.811 kW), which is very close to the original and revised definitions.

Boiler horsepower is still used to measure boiler output in industrial boiler engineering in the US. Boiler horsepower is abbreviated BHP, which is also used in many places to symbolize brake horsepower.

=== Drawbar power ===
Drawbar power (dbp) is the power a railway locomotive has available to haul a train or an agricultural tractor to pull an implement. This is a measured figure rather than a calculated one. A special railway car called a dynamometer car coupled behind a locomotive keeps a continuous record of drawbar tension and speed. From these, the power generated can be calculated. To determine the maximum power available, a controllable load is required; it is normally a second locomotive with its brakes applied, in addition to a static load.

If the drawbar force (F) is measured in pounds-force (lbf) and speed (v) is measured in miles per hour (mph), then the drawbar power (P) in horsepower (hp) is

$$\{P\}_\mathrm{hp} = \frac{\{F\}_\mathrm{lbf} \{v\}_\mathrm{mph}}{375}.$$

Example: How much power is needed to pull a drawbar load of 2,025 pounds-force at 5 miles per hour?

$$\{P\}_\mathrm{hp} = \frac{2025 \times 5}{375} = 27.$$

The constant 375 is because 1 hp = 375 lbf⋅mph. If other units are used, the constant is different. When using coherent SI units (watts, newtons, and metres per second), no constant is needed, and the formula becomes P = Fv.

This formula may also be used to calculate the power of a jet engine, using the speed of the jet and the thrust required to maintain that speed.

Example: how much power is generated with a thrust of 4000 pounds at 400 miles per hour?

$$\{P\}_\mathrm{hp} = \frac{4000 \times 400}{375} = 4266.7.$$

=== RAC horsepower (taxable horsepower) ===
This measure was instituted by the Royal Automobile Club and was used to denote the power of early 20th-century British cars. Many cars took their names from this figure (hence the Austin Seven and Riley Nine), while others had names such as "40/50 hp", which indicated the RAC figure followed by the true measured power.

Taxable horsepower does not reflect developed horsepower; rather, it is a calculated figure based on the engine's bore size, number of cylinders, and a (now archaic) presumption of engine efficiency. As new engines were designed with ever-increasing efficiency, it was no longer a useful measure, but was kept in use by UK regulations, which used the rating for tax purposes. The United Kingdom was not the only country that used the RAC rating; many states in Australia used RAC hp to determine taxation. The RAC formula was sometimes applied in British colonies as well, such as Kenya (British East Africa).

$$\text{RAC h.p.} = \frac{D \times D \times n}{2.5}$$

where

- D is the diameter (or bore) of the cylinder in inches,
- n is the number of cylinders.

Since taxable horsepower was computed based on bore and number of cylinders, not based on actual displacement, it gave rise to engines with undersquare dimensions (bore smaller than stroke), which tended to impose an artificially low limit on rotational speed, hampering the potential power output and efficiency of the engine.

The situation persisted for several generations of four- and six-cylinder British engines: For example, Jaguar's 3.4-litre XK engine of the 1950s had six cylinders with a bore of 83 mm (3.27 in) and a stroke of 106 mm (4.17 in), where most American automakers had long since moved to oversquare (large bore, short stroke) V8 engines. See, for example, the early Chrysler Hemi engine.

== Measurement ==
The power of an engine may be measured or estimated at several points in the transmission of the power from its generation to its application. A number of names are used for the power developed at various stages in this process, but none is a clear indicator of either the measurement system or definition used.

In general:

- nominal horsepower is derived from the size of the engine and the piston speed and is only accurate at a steam pressure of 48 kPa (7 psi);
- indicated or gross horsepower is the theoretical capability of the engine [PLAN/ 33000];
- brake/net/crankshaft horsepower (power delivered directly to and measured at the engine's crankshaft) equals
  - indicated horsepower minus frictional losses within the engine (bearing drag, rod and crankshaft windage losses, oil film drag, etc.);
- shaft horsepower (power delivered to and measured at the output shaft of the transmission, when present in the system) equals
  - crankshaft horsepower minus frictional losses in the transmission (bearings, gears, oil drag, windage, etc.);
- effective or true (thp), commonly referred to as wheel horsepower (whp), equals
  - shaft horsepower minus frictional losses in the universal joint/s, differential, wheel bearings, tire and chain, (if present).

All the above assumes that no power inflation factors have been applied to any of the readings.

Engine designers use expressions other than horsepower to denote objective targets or performance, such as brake mean effective pressure (BMEP). This is a coefficient of theoretical brake horsepower and cylinder pressures during combustion.

=== Nominal horsepower ===
Nominal horsepower (nhp) is an early 19th-century rule of thumb used to estimate the power of steam engines. It assumed a steam pressure of 7 psi (48 kPa).

Nominal horsepower = 7 × area of piston in square inches × equivalent piston speed in feet per minute/33,000.

For paddle ships, the Admiralty rule was that the piston speed in feet per minute was taken as 129.7 × (stroke)^{1/3.38}. For screw steamers, the intended piston speed was used.

The stroke (or length of stroke) was the distance moved by the piston measured in feet.

For the nominal horsepower to equal the actual power it would be necessary for the mean steam pressure in the cylinder during the stroke to be 7 psi (48 kPa) and for the piston speed to be that generated by the assumed relationship for paddle ships.

The French Navy used the same definition of nominal horsepower as the Royal Navy.

Comparison of nominal and indicated horsepower
Ship	Indicated horsepower (ihp)	Nominal horsepower (nhp)	Ratio of ihp to nhp	Source
HMS Dee	272	200	1.36	
HMS Locust	157	100	1.57	
HMS Rhadamanthus	400	220	1.82	
HMS Albacore	109	60	1.82	
HMS Porcupine	285	132	2.16	
HMS Harpy	520	200	2.60	
HMS Spitfire	380	140	2.70	
HMS Spiteful	796	280	2.85	
HMS Jackal	455	150	3.03	
HMS Supply	265	80	3.31	
HMS Simoom	1,576	400	3.94	
HMS Hector	3,256	800	4.07	
HMS Agincourt	6,867	1,350	5.08	
HMS Bellerophon	6,521	1,000	6.52	
HMS Monarch	7,842	1,100	7.13	
HMS Penelope	4,703	600	7.84	

=== Indicated horsepower ===
Indicated horsepower (ihp) is the theoretical power of a reciprocating engine if it is completely frictionless in converting the expanding gas energy (piston pressure × displacement) in the cylinders. It is calculated from the pressures developed in the cylinders, measured by a device called an engine indicator – hence indicated horsepower. As the piston advances throughout its stroke, the pressure against the piston generally decreases, and the indicator device usually generates a graph of pressure vs stroke within the working cylinder. From this graph the amount of work performed during the piston stroke may be calculated.

Indicated horsepower was a better measure of engine power than nominal horsepower (nhp) because it took account of steam pressure. But unlike later measures such as shaft horsepower (shp) and brake horsepower (bhp), it did not take into account power losses due to the machinery internal frictional losses, such as a piston sliding within the cylinder, plus bearing friction, transmission and gear box friction, etc.

=== Brake horsepower ===
Brake horsepower (bhp) is the power measured using a brake type (load) dynamometer at a specified location, such as the crankshaft, output shaft of the transmission, rear axle or rear wheels.

In Europe, the DIN 70020 standard tests the engine fitted with all ancillaries and the exhaust system as used in the car. The older American standard (SAE gross horsepower, referred to as bhp) used an engine without alternator, water pump, and other auxiliary components such as power steering pump, muffled exhaust system, etc., so the figures were higher than the European figures for the same engine. The newer American standard (referred to as SAE net horsepower) tests an engine with all the auxiliary components (detailed in Engine power test standards).

Brake refers to the device which is used to provide an equal braking force, load to balance, or equal an engine's output force and hold it at a desired rotational speed. During testing, the output torque and rotational speed are measured to determine the brake horsepower. Horsepower was originally measured and calculated by use of the "indicator diagram" (a James Watt invention of the late 18th century), and later by means of a Prony brake connected to the engine's output shaft. Modern dynamometers use any of several braking methods to measure the engine's brake horsepower, the actual output of the engine itself, before losses to the drivetrain.

=== Shaft horsepower ===
Shaft horsepower (shp) is the power delivered to a propeller or turbine shaft. Shaft horsepower is a common rating for turboshaft and turboprop engines, industrial turbines, and some marine applications.

Equivalent shaft horsepower (eshp) is sometimes used to rate turboprop engines. It includes the equivalent power derived from residual jet thrust from the turbine exhaust. 2.5 pounds-force (11 N) of residual jet thrust is estimated to be produced from one unit of horsepower.

== Engine power test standards ==
There exist a number of different standards determining how the power and torque of an automobile engine is measured and corrected. Correction factors are used to adjust power and torque measurements to standard atmospheric conditions, to provide a more accurate comparison between engines as they are affected by the pressure, humidity, and temperature of ambient air. Some standards are described below.

=== Society of Automotive Engineers/SAE International ===
==== Early "SAE horsepower" ====
In the early twentieth century, a so-called "SAE horsepower" was sometimes quoted for U.S. automobiles. This long predates the Society of Automotive Engineers (SAE) horsepower measurement standards and was another name for the industry standard ALAM or NACC horsepower figure and the same as the British RAC horsepower also used for tax purposes. Alliance for Automotive Innovation is the current successor of ALAM and NACC.

==== SAE gross power ====
Prior to the 1972 model year, American automakers rated and advertised their engines in brake horsepower, bhp, which was a version of brake horsepower called SAE gross horsepower because it was measured according to Society of Automotive Engineers (SAE) standards (J245 and J1995) that call for a stock test engine without accessories (such as dynamo/alternator, radiator fan, water pump), and sometimes fitted with long tube test headers in lieu of the OEM exhaust manifolds. This contrasts with both SAE net power and DIN 70020 standards, which account for engine accessories (but not transmission losses). The atmospheric correction standards for barometric pressure, humidity and temperature for SAE gross power testing were relatively idealistic.

==== SAE net power ====
In the United States, the term bhp fell into disuse in 1971–1972, as automakers began to quote power in terms of SAE net horsepower in accord with SAE standard J1349. Like SAE gross and other brake horsepower protocols, SAE net hp is measured at the engine's crankshaft, and so does not account for transmission losses. However, similar to the DIN 70020 standard, SAE net power testing protocol calls for standard production-type belt-driven accessories, air cleaner, emission controls, exhaust system, and other power-consuming accessories. This produces ratings in closer alignment with the power produced by the engine as it is actually configured and sold.

==== SAE certified power ====
In 2005, the SAE introduced "SAE Certified Power" with SAE J2723. To attain certification the test must follow the SAE standard in question, take place in an ISO 9000/9002 certified facility and be witnessed by an SAE approved third party.

A few manufacturers such as Honda and Toyota switched to the new ratings immediately. The rating for the Toyota Camry 3.0 L 1MZ-FE V6 fell from 210 to 190 hp (157 to 142 kW). The company's Lexus ES 330 and Camry SE V6 were previously rated at 225 hp (168 kW) but the ES 330 dropped to 218 hp (163 kW) while the Camry declined to 210 hp (157 kW). The first engine certified under the new program was the 7.0-litre LS7 used in the 2006 Chevrolet Corvette Z06. Certified power rose slightly from 500 to 505 hp (373 to 377 kW).

While Toyota and Honda are retesting their entire vehicle lineups, other automakers generally are retesting only those with updated powertrains. For example, the 2006 Ford Five Hundred is rated at 203 hp (151 kW), the same as that of 2005 model. However, the 2006 rating does not reflect the new SAE testing procedure, as Ford did not opt to incur the extra expense of retesting its existing engines. Over time, most automakers are expected to comply with the new guidelines.

SAE tightened its horsepower rules to eliminate the opportunity for engine manufacturers to manipulate factors affecting performance such as how much oil was in the crankcase, engine control system calibration, and whether an engine was tested with high octane fuel. In some cases, such can add up to a change in horsepower ratings.

=== Deutsches Institut für Normung 70020 (DIN 70020) ===
DIN 70020 is a German DIN standard for measuring road vehicle horsepower. DIN hp is measured at the engine's output shaft as a form of metric horsepower rather than mechanical horsepower. Similar to SAE net power rating, and unlike SAE gross power, DIN testing measures the engine as installed in the vehicle, with cooling system, charging system and stock exhaust system all connected. DIN hp is often abbreviated as "PS", derived from the German word Pferdestärke (literally, "horse strength").

=== CUNA ===
A test standard by Italian CUNA (Commissione Tecnica per l'Unificazione nell'Automobile, Technical Commission for Automobile Unification), a federated entity of standards organisation UNI, was formerly used in Italy. CUNA prescribed that the engine be tested with all accessories necessary to its running fitted (such as the water pump), while all others – such as alternator/dynamo, radiator fan, and exhaust manifold – could be omitted. All calibration and accessories had to be as on production engines.

=== Economic Commission for Europe R24 ===
ECE R24 is a UN standard for the approval of compression ignition engine emissions, installation and measurement of engine power. It is similar to DIN 70020 standard, but with different requirements for connecting an engine's fan during testing causing it to absorb less power from the engine.

=== Economic Commission for Europe R85 ===
ECE R85 is a UN standard for the approval of internal combustion engines with regard to the measurement of the net power.

=== 80/1269/EEC ===
80/1269/EEC of 16 December 1980 is a European Union standard for road vehicle engine power.

=== International Organization for Standardization ===
The International Organization for Standardization (ISO) publishes several standards for measuring engine horsepower.

- ISO 14396 specifies the additional and method requirement for determining the power of reciprocating internal combustion engines when presented for an ISO 8178 exhaust emission test. It applies to reciprocating internal combustion engines for land, rail and marine use excluding engines of motor vehicles primarily designed for road use.
- ISO 1585 is an engine net power test code intended for road vehicles.
- ISO 2534 is an engine gross power test code intended for road vehicles.
- ISO 4164 is an engine net power test code intended for mopeds.
- ISO 4106 is an engine net power test code intended for motorcycles.
- ISO 9249 is an engine net power test code intended for earth moving machines.

=== Japanese Industrial Standard (JIS) D 1001 ===
JIS D 1001 is a Japanese net, and gross, engine power test code for automobiles or trucks having a spark ignition, diesel engine, or fuel injection engine.

== See also ==
- Brake-specific fuel consumption – how much fuel an engine consumes per unit energy output
- Dynamometer engine testing
- European units of measurement directives
- Horsepower-hour
- Mean effective pressure
- Torque
