= ETKA =

Official electronic parts catalogue for Volkswagen Group motor vehicles

ETKA is the official electronic parts catalogue for Volkswagen Group motor vehicles. Launched in 1989, ETKA superseded the older parts books and microfilm-based catalogues. ETKA is an abbreviation from the German: Elektronischer Teilekatalog. It is produced for Volkswagen AG by the Munich-based specialist automotive industry information systems software publisher LexCom Informationssysteme GmbH. As of March 2023 the latest release of the ETKA software is ETKA 8.6. which includes workshop manual pages, more photos, and the ability to upload photos.

== ETKA detail ==
ETKA details genuine original parts from Volkswagen Group's four mainstream marques of automobiles, Volkswagen, SEAT, Škoda, Audi and Cupra. It also covers Volkswagen Commercial Vehicles, Volkswagen Marine, and Volkswagen Industrial Motor. The coverage ranges from the 1947 Volkswagen Beetle, right through to the latest present day vehicles and associated applications.

The five marques covered by ETKA also have specific sections for geographic regions, along with its main "home market" of Europe. Furthermore, ETKA is customisable in specifics such as local purchase or sales taxes, local currencies, delivery addresses, and communications protocols.

With the facility to directly input individual Vehicle Identification Numbers (VIN), ETKA includes the ability to access the central database at Volkswagen AG, and highlights vehicle-specific components from within the larger range of components of the relevant vehicle model. These results can then be used to auto-generate online ordering for required parts, and can be fully integrated into third party Dealership Management Systems (DMS).

Additional inclusive components of ETKA are catalogues for generic hardware (fastenings, bulbs, batteries, etc.) and chemicals (oils, greases, sealants), along with a general accessories catalogue. It can also give information as regards any outstanding workshop actions against the vehicle chassis number.

== Similar products ==
LexCom also produce electronic parts catalogues for other marques. These include:

- the Porsche parts catalogue, PET (German: Porsche Elektronischer Teilekatalog), which is arranged in an identical fashion to Volkswagen Group's ETKA.
- the truckmaker MAN's MANTIS, which replaced their previous CAPS parts catalogue.

Alternative catalogs of brands Audi Volkswagen, Skoda, Seat, Porsche

- Volkswagen parts catalog
- Volkswagen Commercial parts catalog
- Audi parts catalog
- Skoda parts catalog
- Seat parts catalog
- Porsche parts catalog

== See also ==
- Parts locator
- Product information management
