= Marine automobile engine =

Boat engines

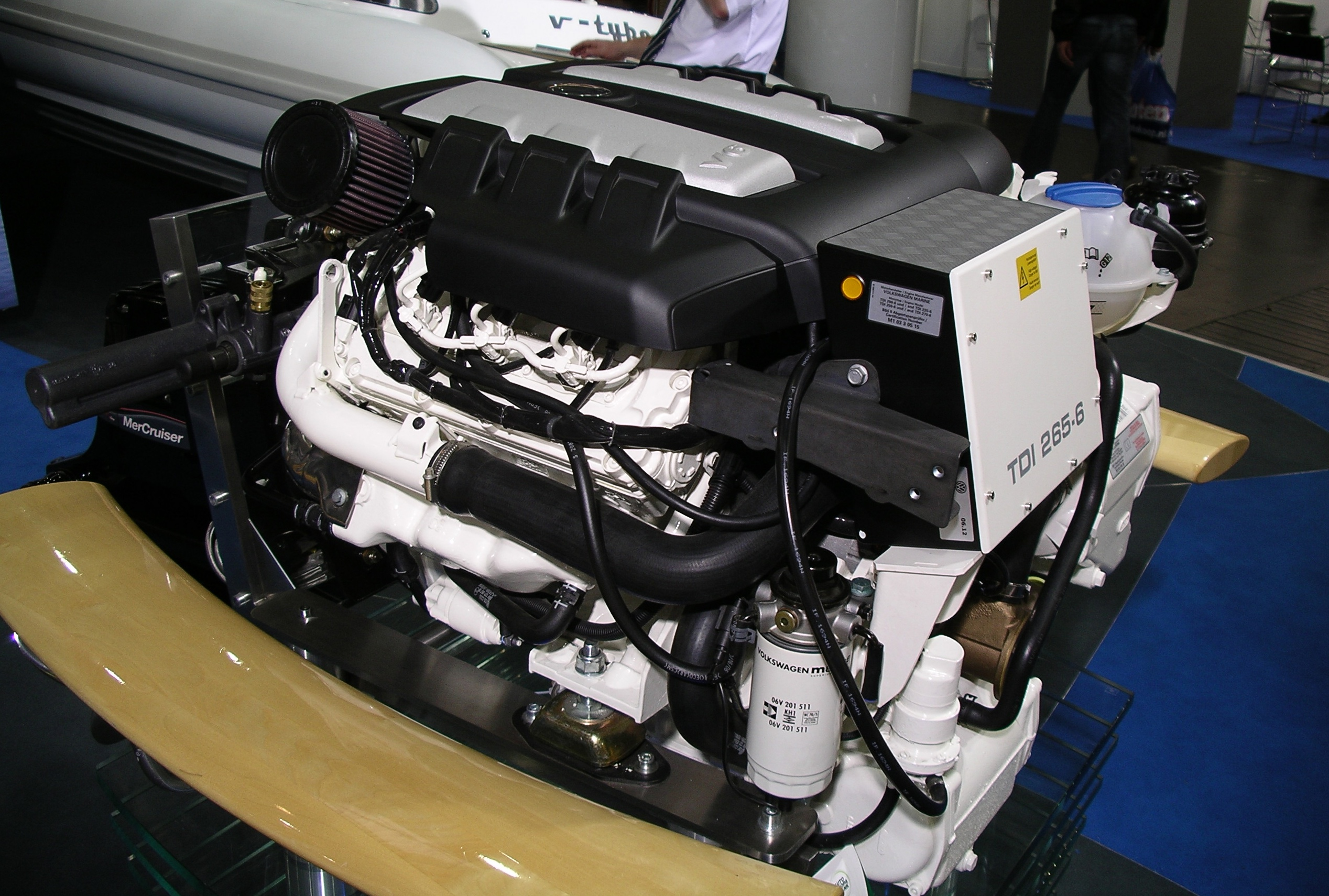
Volkswagen Marine 3.0 litre V6 TDI 265-6 marine engine. This is a marine-modified version of Volkswagen Groups 3.0 V6 24v TDI CR automobile engine.

Marine automobile engines are types of automobile petrol or diesel engines that have been specifically modified for use in the marine environment. The differences include changes made for the operating in a marine environment, safety, performance, and for regulatory requirements. The act of modifying is called 'marinisation'.

== Background ==
All of the "Big 3" American auto companies have had engines marinised at some point. Chrysler is notable, because the company marinised engines in-house through Chrysler Marine, as well as selling engines to third parties such as Indmar or Pleasurecraft Marine.

General Motors marine automobile engines are based on a gasoline truck engine. That means four-bolt main bearing caps instead of just two; sometimes the crankshaft is forged steel and the pistons an upgraded aluminum alloy. Most importantly the camshaft profile is different with the overlap ground to 112 degrees instead of 110. Expansion plugs are bronze to better fight corrosion. The head gasket's metal O-ring is also more corrosion resistant.

Examples of the opposite of a marinised car engine also exist, e.g. the 6.2- or 6.5-liter Detroit Diesel V8 engine found in Chevrolet and GMC utility vehicles was originally a marine engine adapted for automotive use.

== Safety modifications ==
=== Electrical systems ===
- Starter motors and alternators have internal screens to minimize spark egress.

=== Fuel systems (petrol/gasoline engines) ===
Sources:

- Fuel pumps are constructed such that if their diaphragm ruptures, the excess fuel will be directed into the carburettor.
- Carburetors do not allow overflow into the boat engine compartment.
- Spark arrestor are installed on the engine's air intake (carburetor or electronic fuel injector). The arrestor is a wire mesh screen that cools any internal flame or spark created by back-fire, preventing it from igniting fuel vapours inside the engine compartment.

=== Cooling systems ===
- Engines are water-cooled, drawing raw water through a pickup at the bottom of the boat. In an open cooling configuration, the raw water is circulated directly through the engine and exits after passing through jackets around the exhaust manifolds, while in a closed cooling configuration anti-freeze circulates through the engine and raw water is pumped into a heat exchanger. In both cases hot water is released into the exhaust system and blown out with the engine exhaust gasses.
- The transmission oil cooler is cooled by raw water.

== Performance modifications ==
=== Distribution ===
The distributor does not have a vacuum advance. Vacuum advances are normally actuated at high rpm/low load situations, which rarely occur in the marine environment: under normal operation, a high rpm generally means a high engine load.

=== Lubrication ===
- Lubricating oil is cooled in a shell-and-tube type heat exchanger by raw water.
- The oil sump is bigger and often has a different shape, so as not to affect the boat's stability.
