= ISO 8178 =

ISO standard

ISO 8178 is a collection of steady state test cycles used for defining emission standards for non-road engines in the European Union, United States, Japan and other countries. Test cycle ISO 8178 C1 is also referred to as "Non-Road Steady Cycle" and used extensively. The Non-road Transient Cycle is supplementing it in some modern emission standards.

It is defined by the International Organization for Standardization (ISO).

== Parts ==
The ISO 8178 Reciprocating internal combustion engines — Exhaust emission measurement standard comes in 11 parts:

- ISO 8178-1:2020 Part 1: Test-bed measurement systems of gaseous and particulate emissions
- ISO 8178-2:2008 Part 2: Measurement of gaseous and particulate exhaust emissions under field conditions
- ISO 8178-3:2019 Part 3: Test procedures for measurement of exhaust gas smoke emissions from compression ignition engines using a filter type smoke meter
- ISO 8178-4:2020 Part 4: Steady-state and transient test cycles for different engine applications
- ISO 8178-5:2021 Part 5: Test fuels
- ISO 8178-6:2018 Part 6: Report of measuring results and test
- ISO 8178-7:2015 Part 7: Engine family determination
- ISO 8178-8:2015 Part 8: Engine group determination
- ISO 8178-9:2019 Part 9: Test cycles and test procedures for test bed measurement of exhaust gas smoke emissions from compression ignition engines operating under transient conditions
- ISO 8178-10:2002 Part 10: Test cycles and test procedures for field measurement of exhaust gas smoke emissions from compression ignition engines operating under transient conditions (Withdrawn in 2019)
- ISO 8178-11:2006 Part 11: Test-bed measurement of gaseous and particulate exhaust emissions from engines used in nonroad mobile machinery under transient test conditions (Withdrawn in 2014-08-13)

== External links/source ==
- Dieselnet.com: ISO 8178
- ISO8178-1:2006
  ... through ...
- ISO8178-11:2006
