= Parts locator =

Computer program

A parts locator or inventory locator is a computer program that enables users to locate spare parts or other inventory items in a number of different storage locations, usually of different owners.

A parts locator can be used to improve spare parts management by increasing parts availability and decreasing obsolescence.

Parts locators can be included in other (packaged) software such as Dealership Management Systems (DMS) or inventory control systems; or can be offered as a separate program. Due to the purpose of the software, it becomes more valuable when it has more users, as the number of inventories that are made available increases with the number of users.

Examples of specialised suppliers of parts locators are OEConnection, PareX Parts Exchange (PareX) and Inventory Locator Service, LLC (ILS).
