= Volkswagen Golf Mk8 =

Eighth generation of Golf compact car

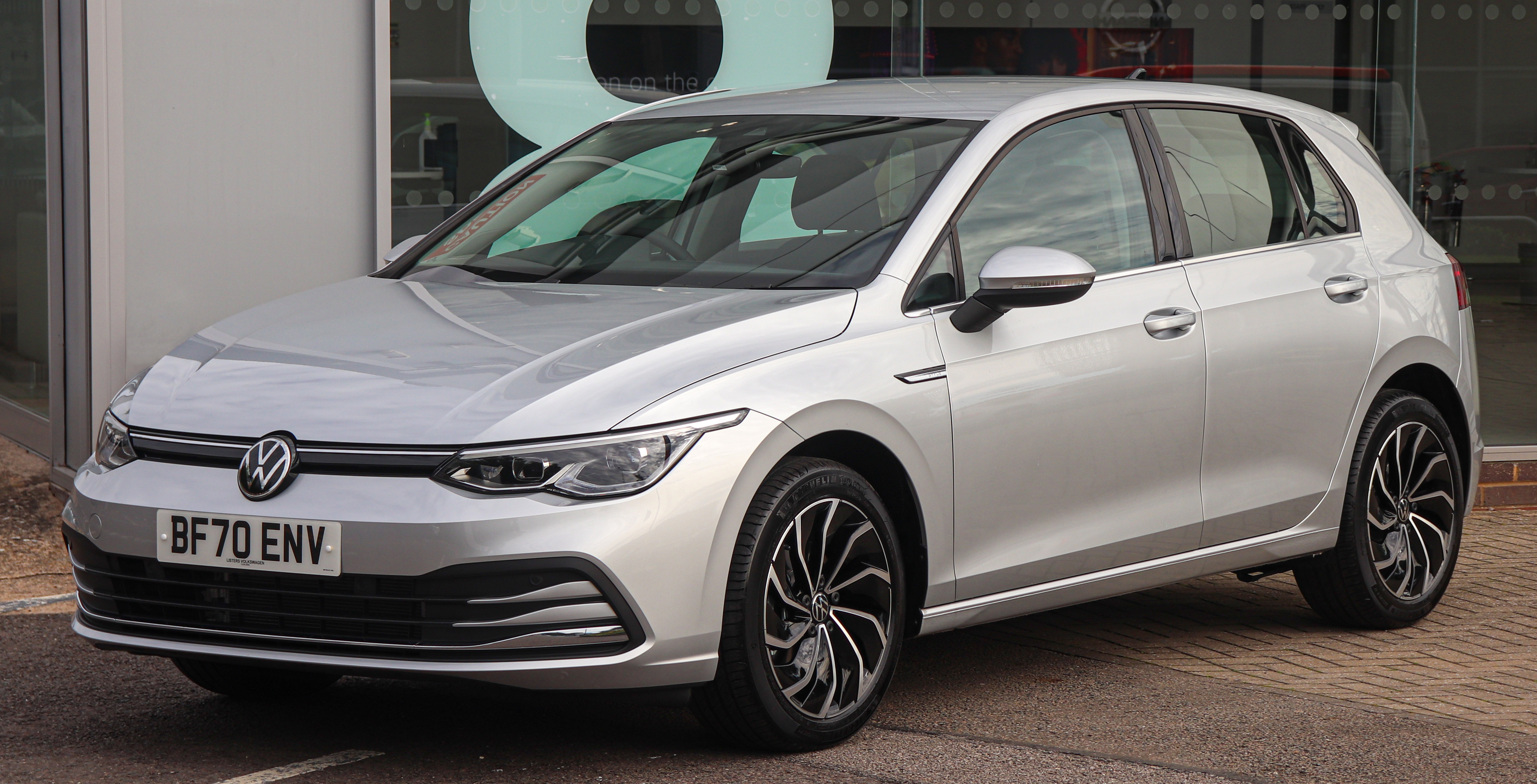

Overview
- Manufacturer: Volkswagen
- Model code: CD1; CG5 (estate)
- Production: 2019–present
- Model years: 2022–present (North America)
- Assembly: Germany: Wolfsburg (Wolfsburg Volkswagen Plant); China: Foshan (FAW-VW, since 2020); Malaysia: Pekan (HICOM)
- Designer: Klaus Zyciora and Felipe Montoya Bueloni; Klaus Zyciora and Felix Schell (estate)

Body and chassis
- Class: Small family car (C)
- Body style: 5-door hatchback; 5-door estate
- Layout: Front-engine, front-wheel-drive / four-wheel-drive (4motion)
- Platform: Volkswagen Group MQB Evo
- Related: Audi A3 Mk4; SEAT León Mk4; Škoda Octavia Mk4; Volkswagen T-Roc Mk2

Powertrain
- Engine: Petrol: 1.0 L EA211 TSI turbo I3; 1.4 L EA211 TSI I4; 1.5 L EA211 Evo TSI turbo I4 TSI; 2.0 L EA888 Evo 3 TSI I4; 2.0 L EA888 Evo 4 TSI I4; Petrol/CNG: 1.5 L EA211 EVO turbo CNG TGI I4; Petrol hybrid: 1.0 L EA211 turbo I3 (mild hybrid); 1.4 L EA211 turbo I4 (PHEV); 1.5 L EA211 Evo turbo I4 (mild hybrid); Diesel: 2.0 L EA288 evo 4 TDI I4
- Transmission: 5/6-speed manual 6/7-speed DSG dual-clutch 8-speed automatic
- Hybrid drivetrain: MHEV (eTSI); PHEV (TSI eHybrid)

Dimensions
- Wheelbase: 2,636 mm (103.8 in)
- Length: 4,284 mm (168.7 in) (hatchback); 4,633 mm (182.4 in) (estate)
- Width: 1,789 mm (70.4 in)
- Height: 1,456 mm (57.3 in) (hatchback); 1,498 mm (59.0 in) (estate)
- Kerb weight: 1,255–1,465 kg (2,767–3,230 lb)

Chronology
- Predecessor: Volkswagen Golf Mk7; Volkswagen Beetle A5

The Volkswagen Golf (Mk8) (also known as the Golf VIII) is a small family car, the eighth generation of the Volkswagen Golf and the successor to the Volkswagen Golf Mk7. It was launched in Wolfsburg on 24 October 2019, and arrived in German showrooms in December 2019.

The Golf Mk8 uses the same MQB Evo platform as the fourth-generation Audi A3 and SEAT León.

== Features ==
The exterior of the Mk8 has evolutionary design changes, with a new two-dimensional Volkswagen logo and more angular styling. At the rear there are new L-shaped taillights similar to those of the T-Roc. A more prominent downward arch at the nose contributes to a reduced drag coefficient; the Mk8's is Cd=0.275 compared to the Mk7's Cd=0.29, giving a drag area of 0.61 m^{2}. The dimensions are roughly the same as the Mk7, 29 mm longer, and 10 mm narrower with a similar wheelbase. The three-door hatchback has been discontinued, leaving the five-door hatchback as the only model available at launch. The Golf Estate (Variant) was revealed in September 2020, alongside a rugged "Alltrack" version with slightly raised suspension, body cladding, and all-wheel-drive.

=== Technology ===
The Mk8 features several technological advancements, including standard LED headlights on all models and optional matrix LEDs, an advanced head-up display, a shift by wire system on models with the dual-clutch gearbox, Alexa integration, and an NFC mobile key with compatible Samsung smartphones via eSIM. The interior received a major overhaul, replacing the traditional analog instrument panel with an entirely digital 10.25" driver's display and either an 8.25" or 10" center touchscreen for multimedia. Instead of physical buttons, a touch-sensitive panel houses controls for various functions, including the headlights and air conditioning/ventilation. The vehicle can also be upgraded with new functions after purchasing it, such as adaptive cruise control, WiFi hotspot, online-based voice control, Light Assist, navigation and Wireless App-Connect. The reliance on touchscreen controls in place of conventional physical buttons, knobs, or dials was criticised as being frustrating and unintuitive to use. Which? noted that "too much attention must be diverted from the road to operate simple functions such as the climate control" and called the layout "a step backwards."

==== Assistance systems ====
The Mk8 includes a semi-autonomous driving system known as Travel Assist that can work at speeds of up to 210 km/h (130 mph) by using the adaptive cruise control and lane-keeping assist systems. Capacitive sensors in the steering wheel detect when the driver is touching it; if no input is detected for more than 15 seconds, the system will warn the driver before Emergency Assist is activated and the vehicle is brought to a safe stop. It is also the first Volkswagen vehicle to use Car2X, where information can be exchanged with other cars and the traffic infrastructure within a radius of up to 800 m (2,625 ft).

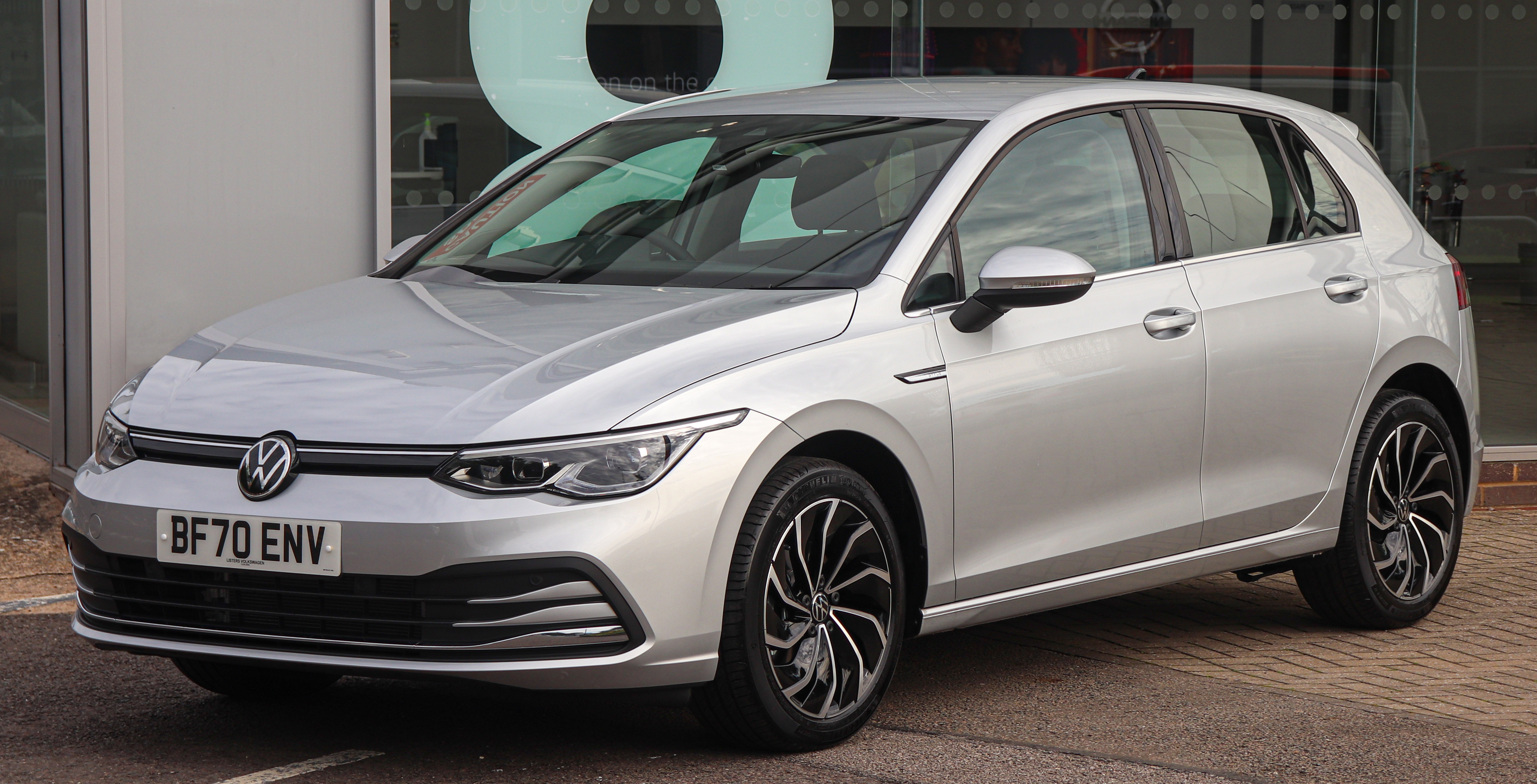
Front view

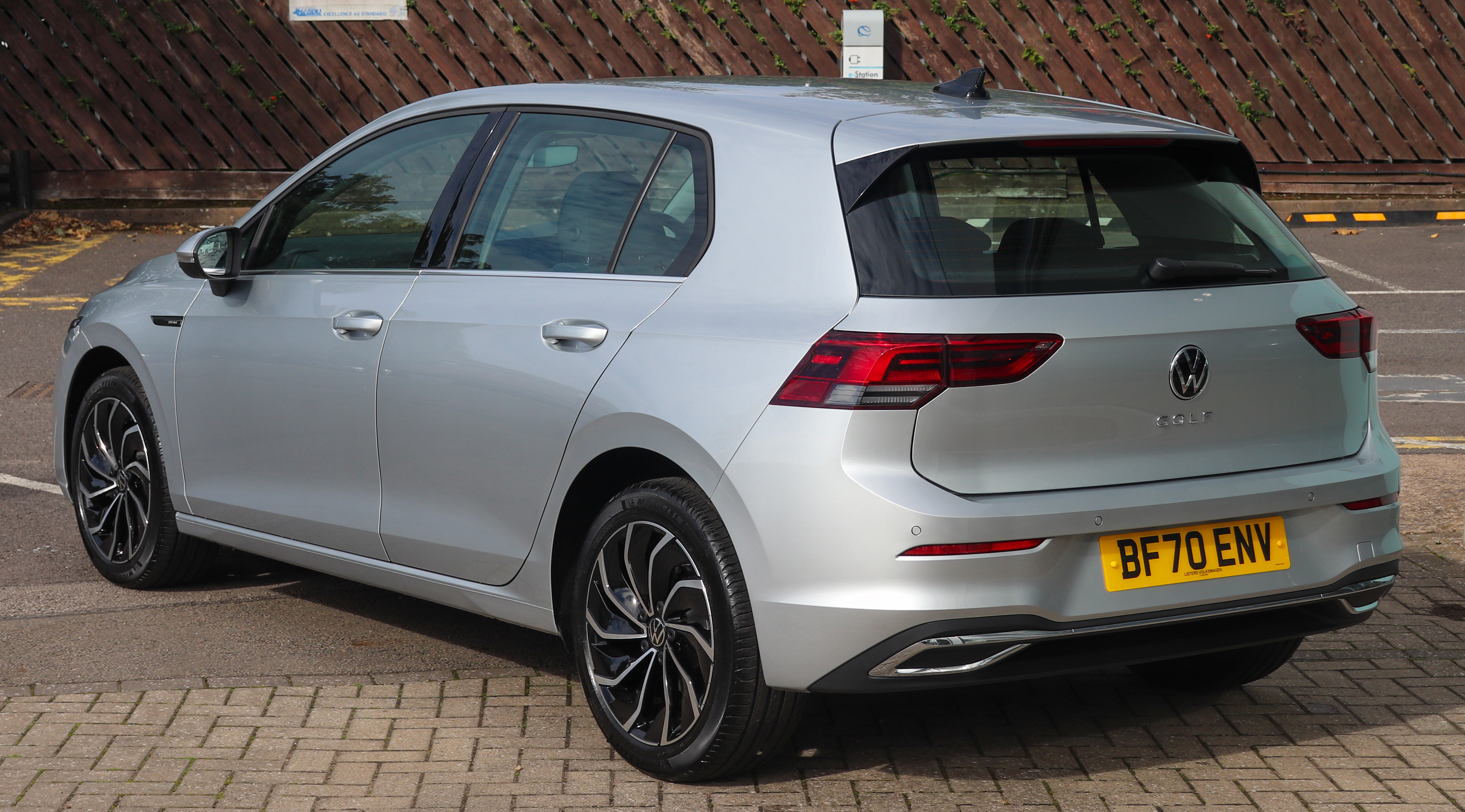
Rear view

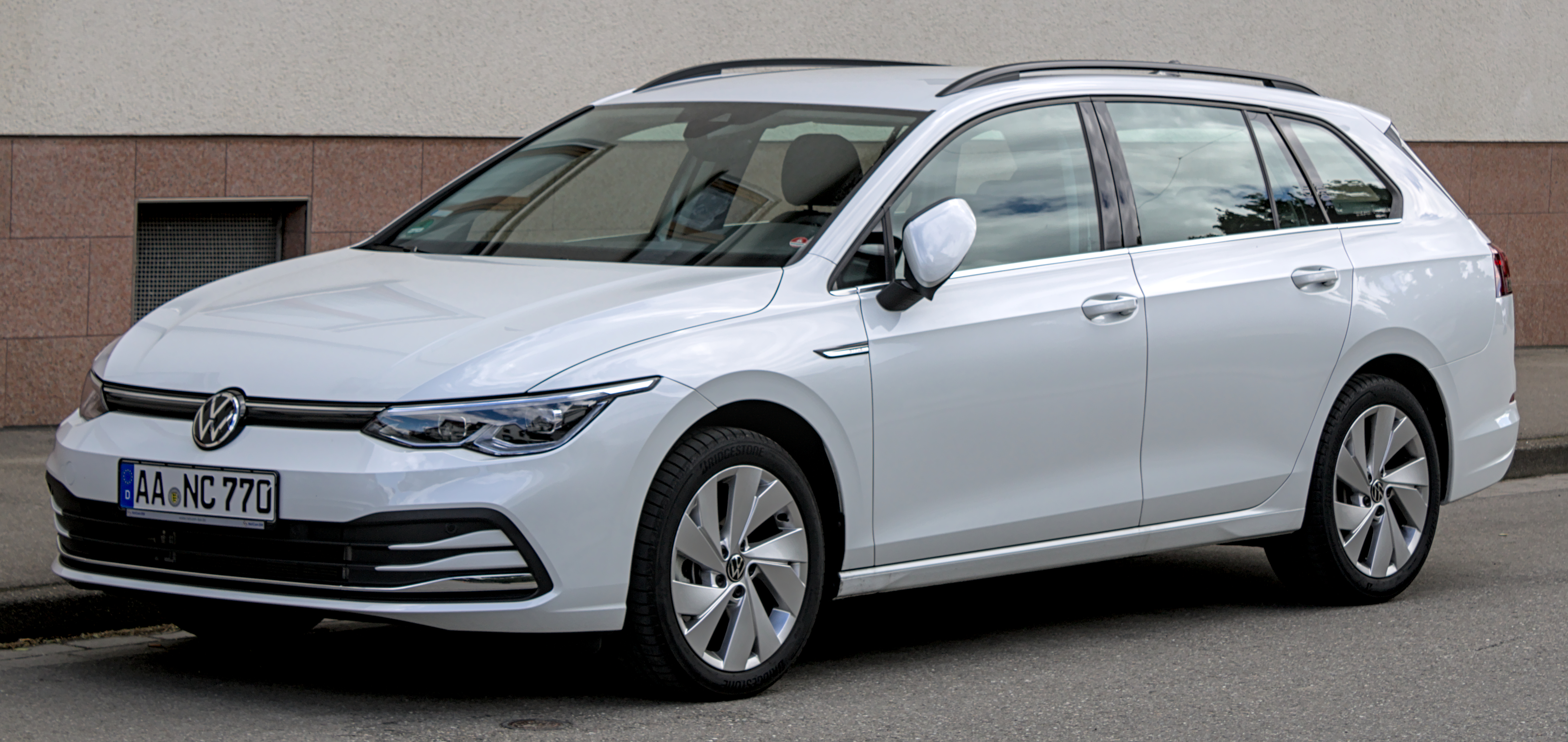
Golf Style Wagon

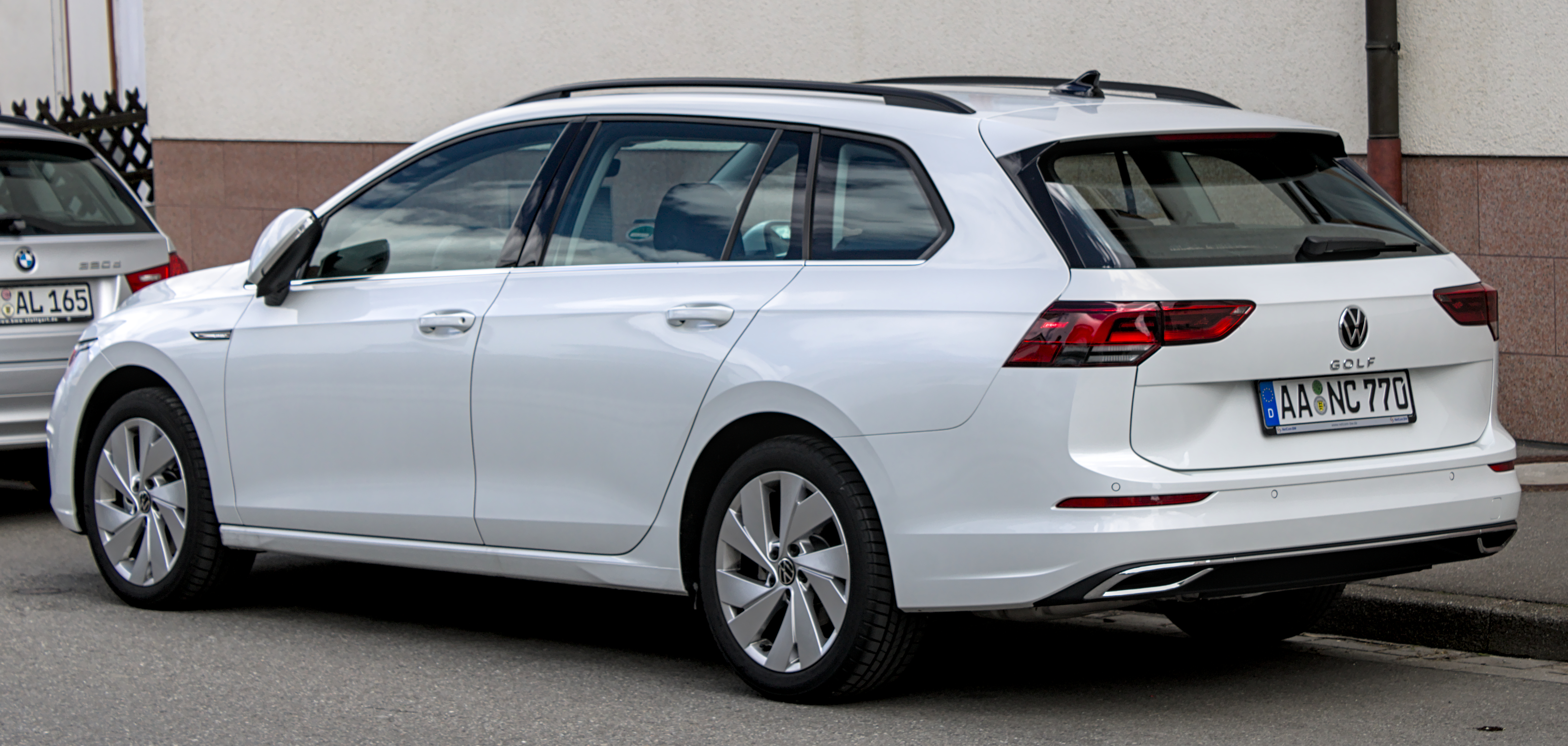
Golf Style Wagon

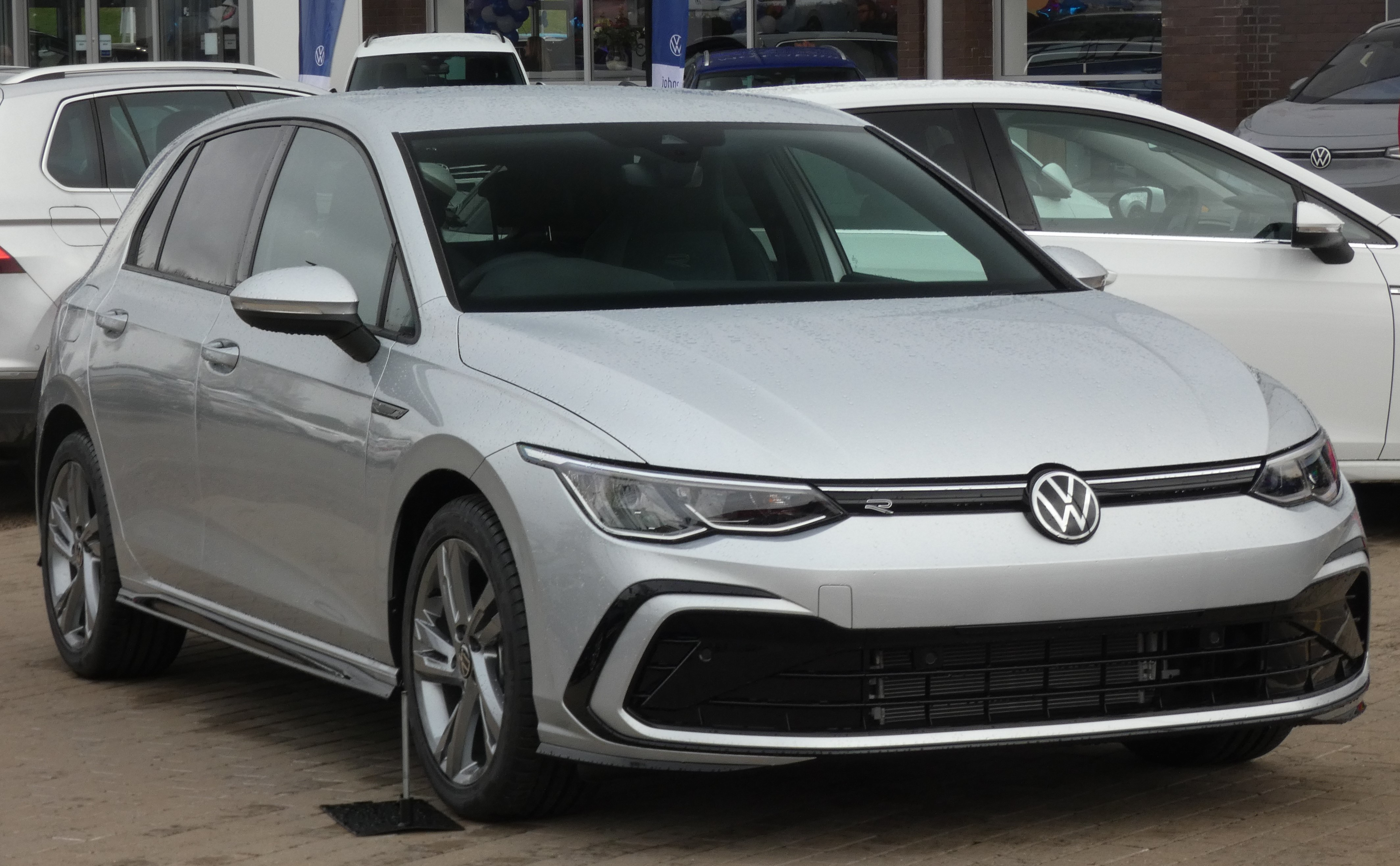
Golf R-Line

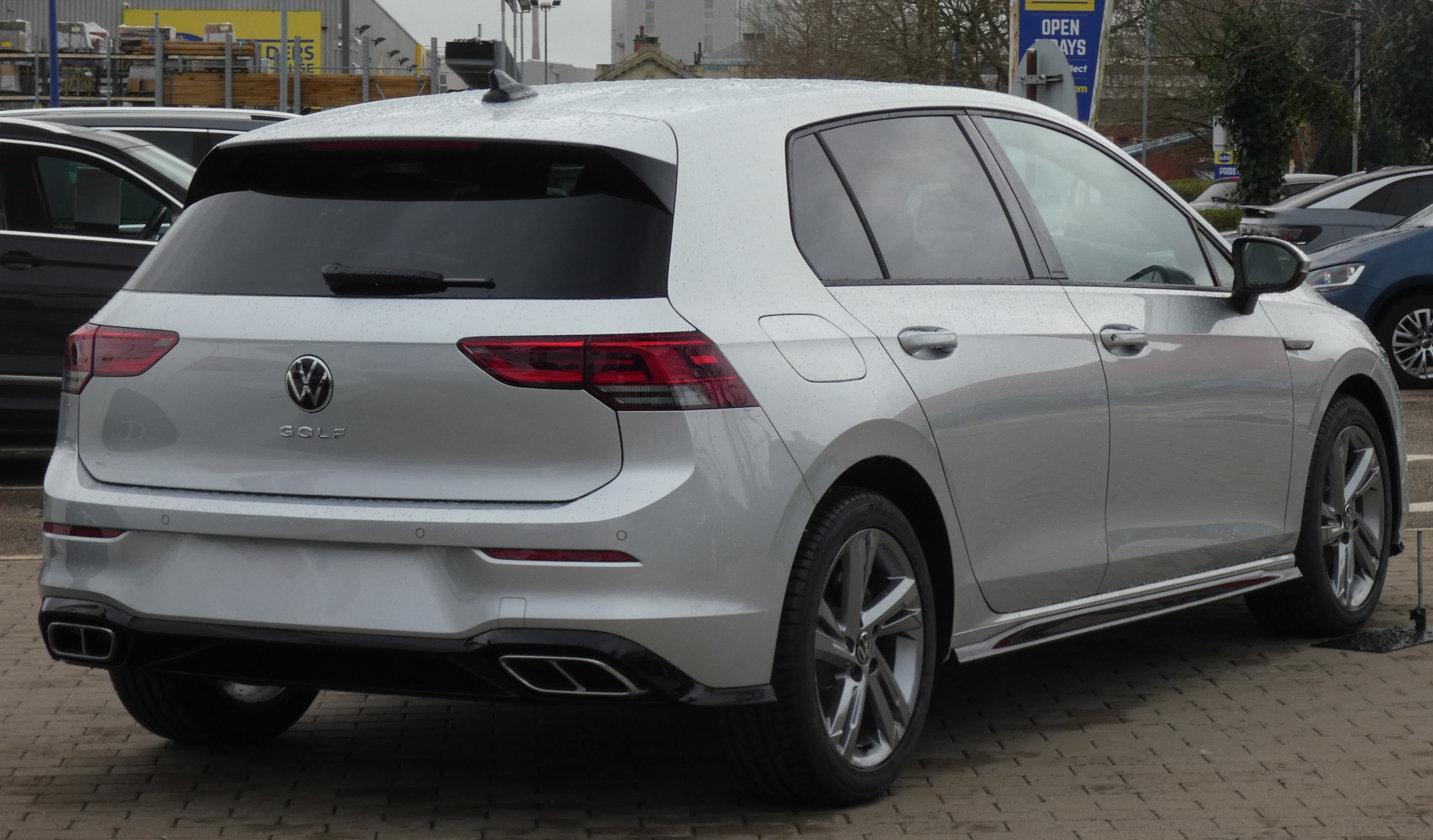
Golf R-Line

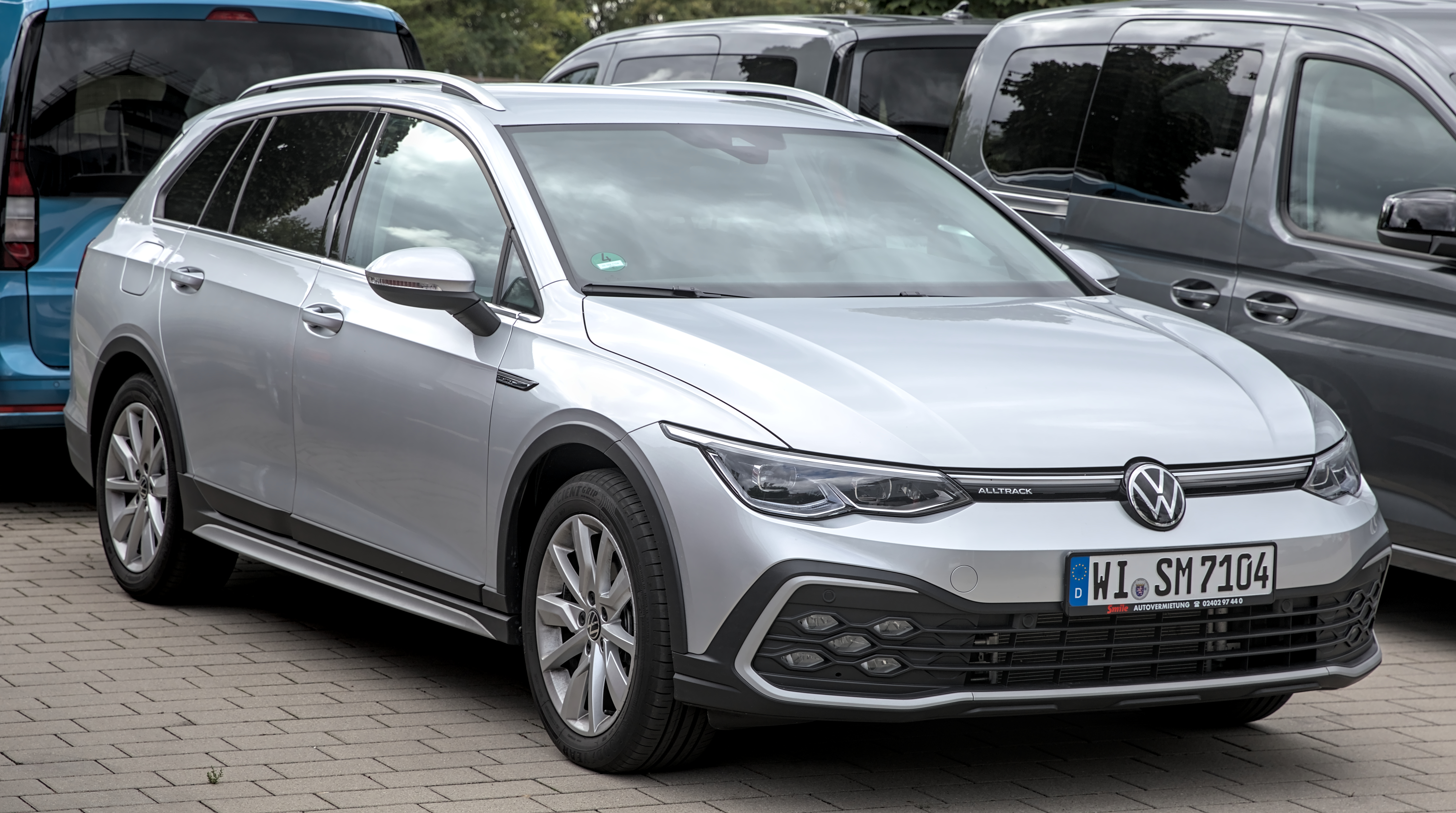
Golf Variant Alltrack

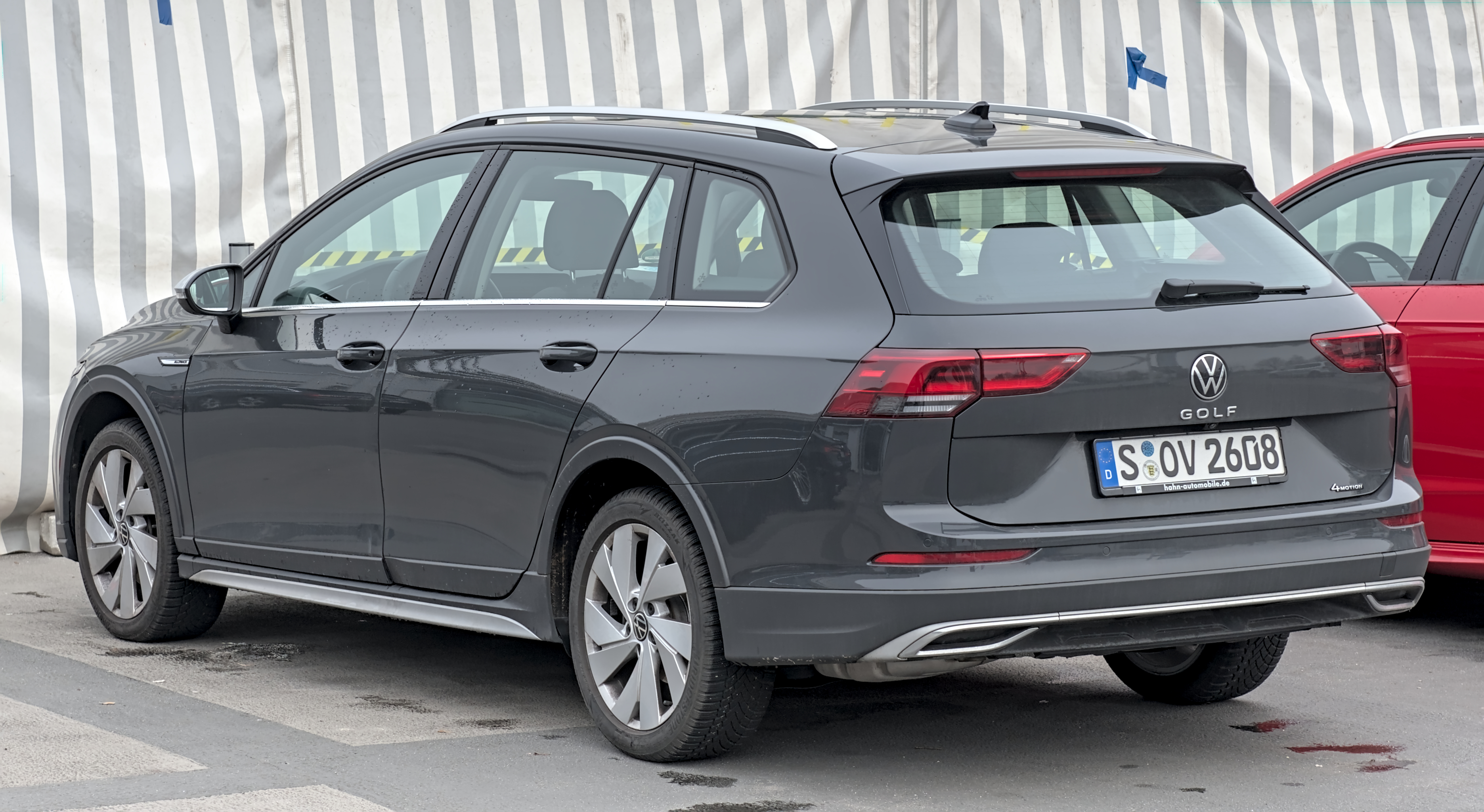
Golf Variant Alltrack

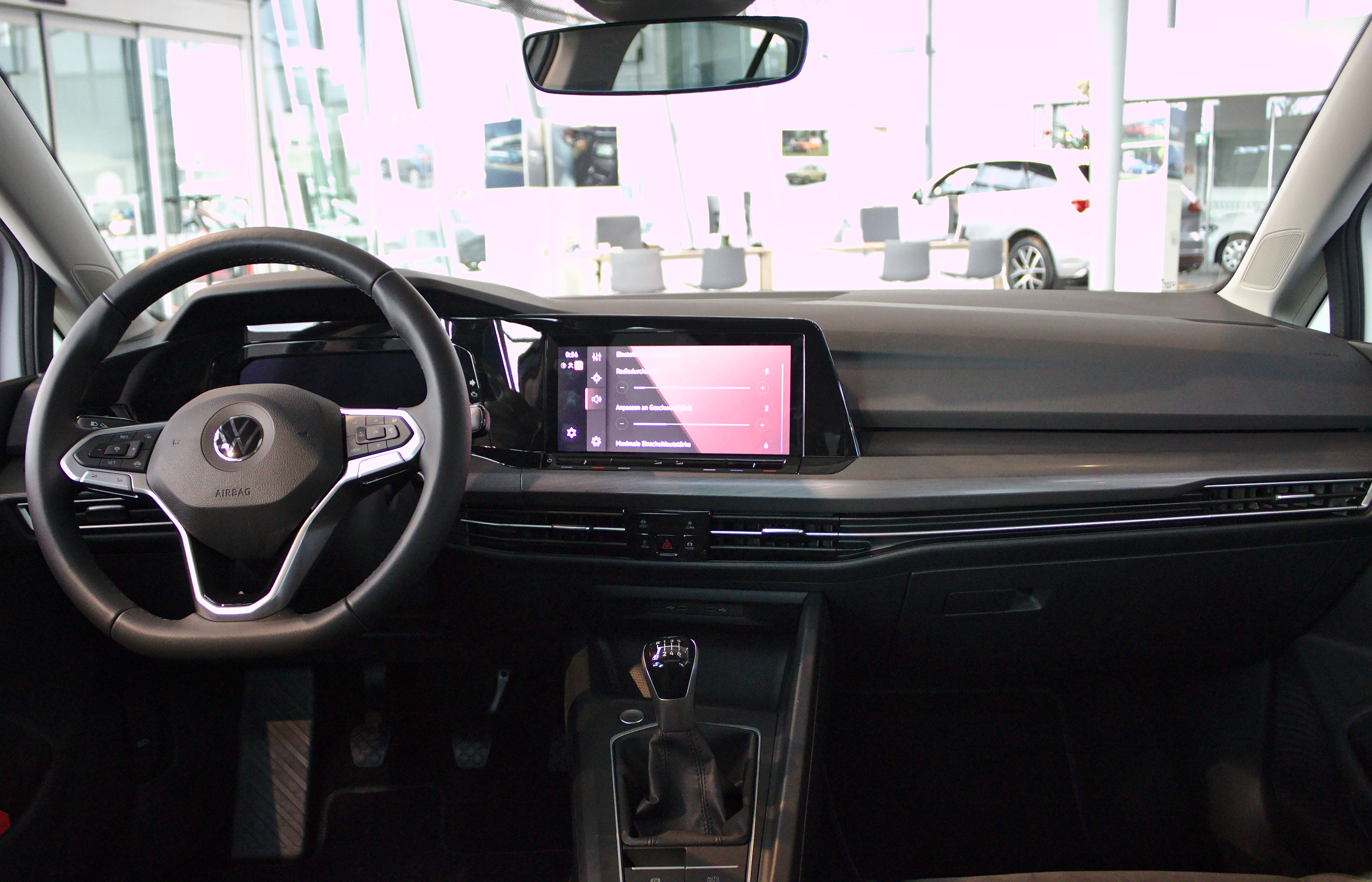
Interior

== Golf GTE ==
The Golf GTE is a hot hatchback version with a plug-in hybrid drivetrain that produces 245 PS (180 kW; 241 hp). It has an all-electric range of about 60 kilometres (37 miles) in EV mode, with a 13 kWh lithium ion battery supplementing the 1.4-litre TSI direct-injection petrol engine. The GTE, GTD, and GTI have different styling to distinguish them from less powerful Golf models. The front has a large honeycomb grille with a blue accent and an LED light strip positioned below, a black lower bumper trim, and an integrated background exterior light. The rear has a diffuser-style rear bumper. The roof spoiler is also different, with wider side sill panels, larger wheels, and red brake calipers. Inside, there are many minor differences, including sports seats with different interior fabrics and other minor changes.

The new 2024 facelift includes a larger 1.5-litre TSI direct-injection petrol engine and a bigger 19.7 kWh battery. Like the pre-facelift it has a standard Golf engine but with a 95 PS (70 kW; 93 hp) electric motor that sits in between the engine (flywheel) and DSG Gearbox.

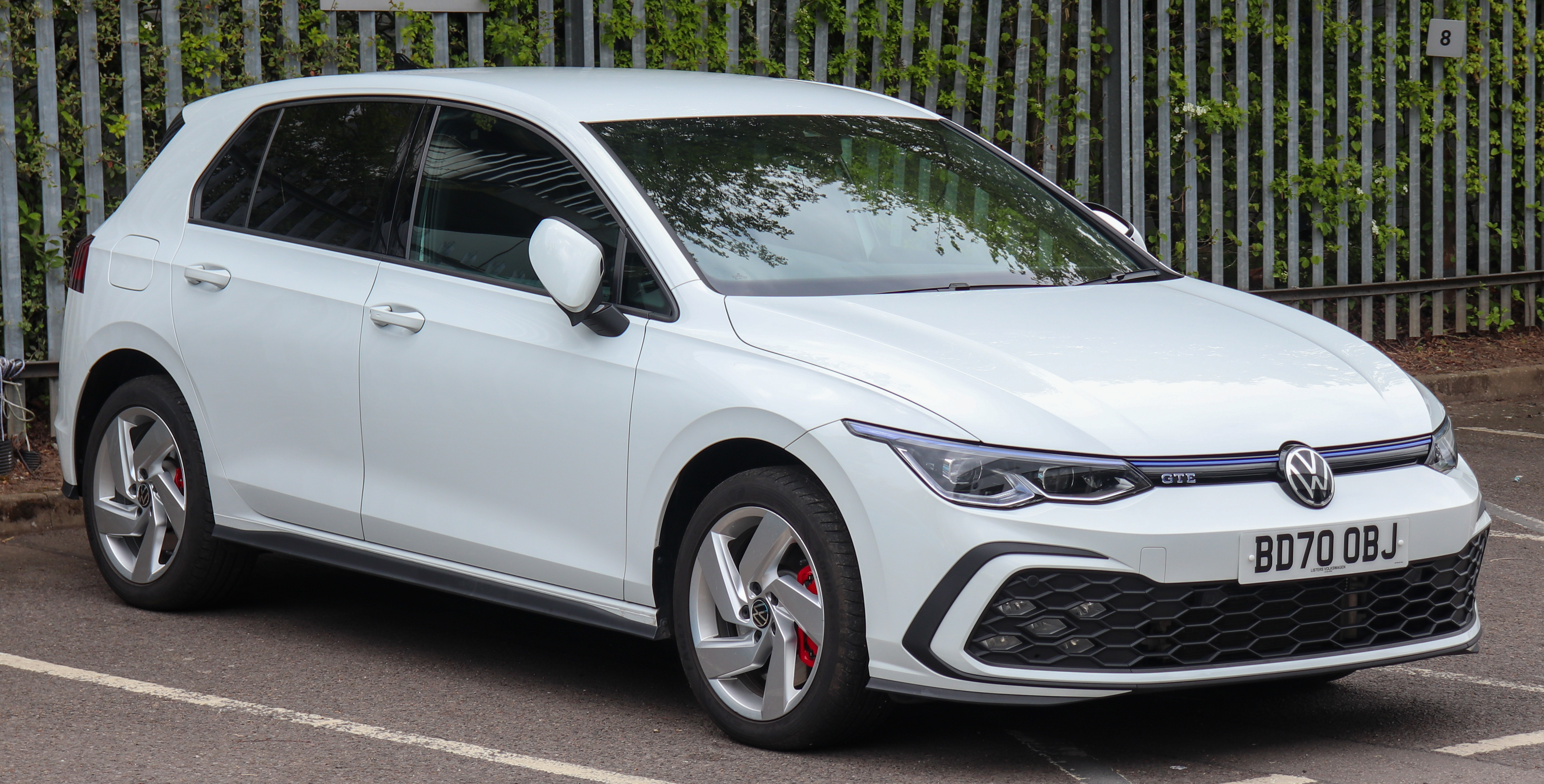
Volkswagen Golf GTE

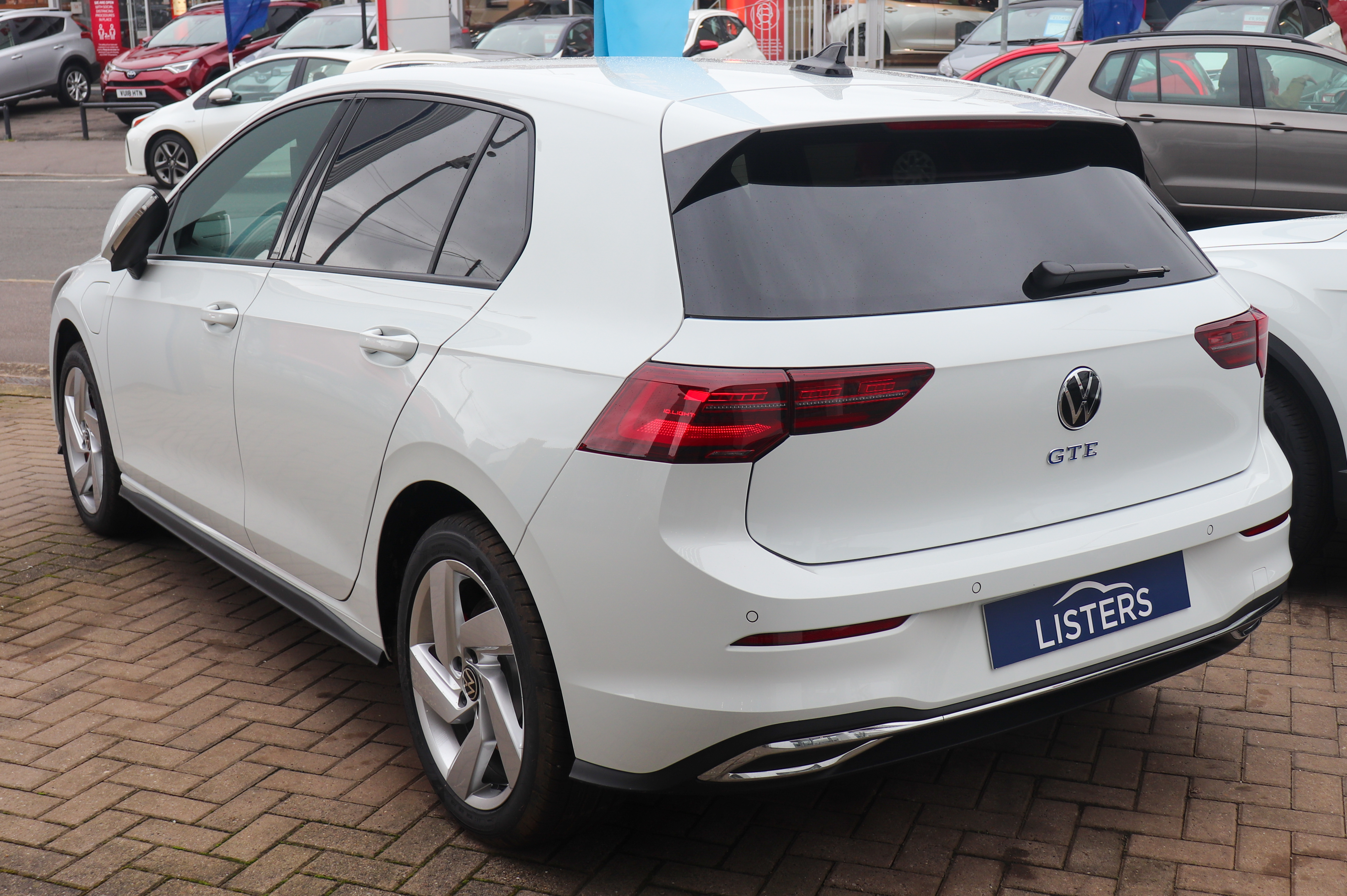
Rear view

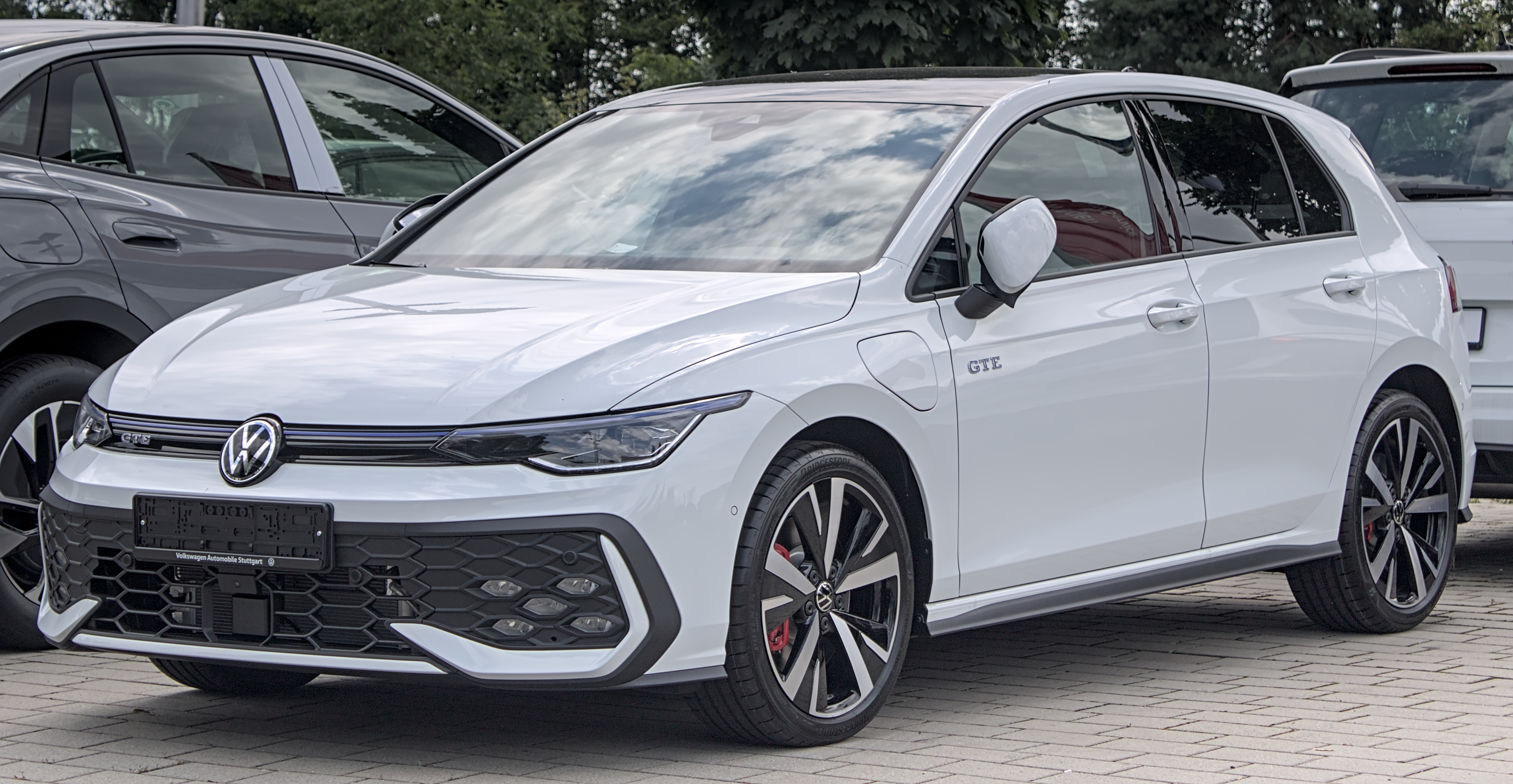
Golf GTE (2024 facelift)

== Golf GTD ==
The Golf GTD is a turbodiesel hot-hatchback version that is powered by a 2.0-litre turbocharged direct-injection diesel engine (TDI) producing 200 PS (147 kW; 197 hp) and 400 N⋅m (295 lbf⋅ft). The engine uses two selective catalytic reduction filters with dual AdBlue injection. The manual transmission is not offered, with the seven-speed dual-clutch automatic being the only option. The suspension is shared with the GTI, having MacPherson struts up front and a multi-link system at the rear. 18-inch and 19-inch wheels are available. Plaid upholstery is standard like on the GTI, but grey highlights are used rather than red; the steering wheel also has touch-sensitive multi-function controls. An electronic shift lever is used in place of the patterned shift knob found on the GTI.

In the 2024 model year, Volkswagen discontinued the GTD.

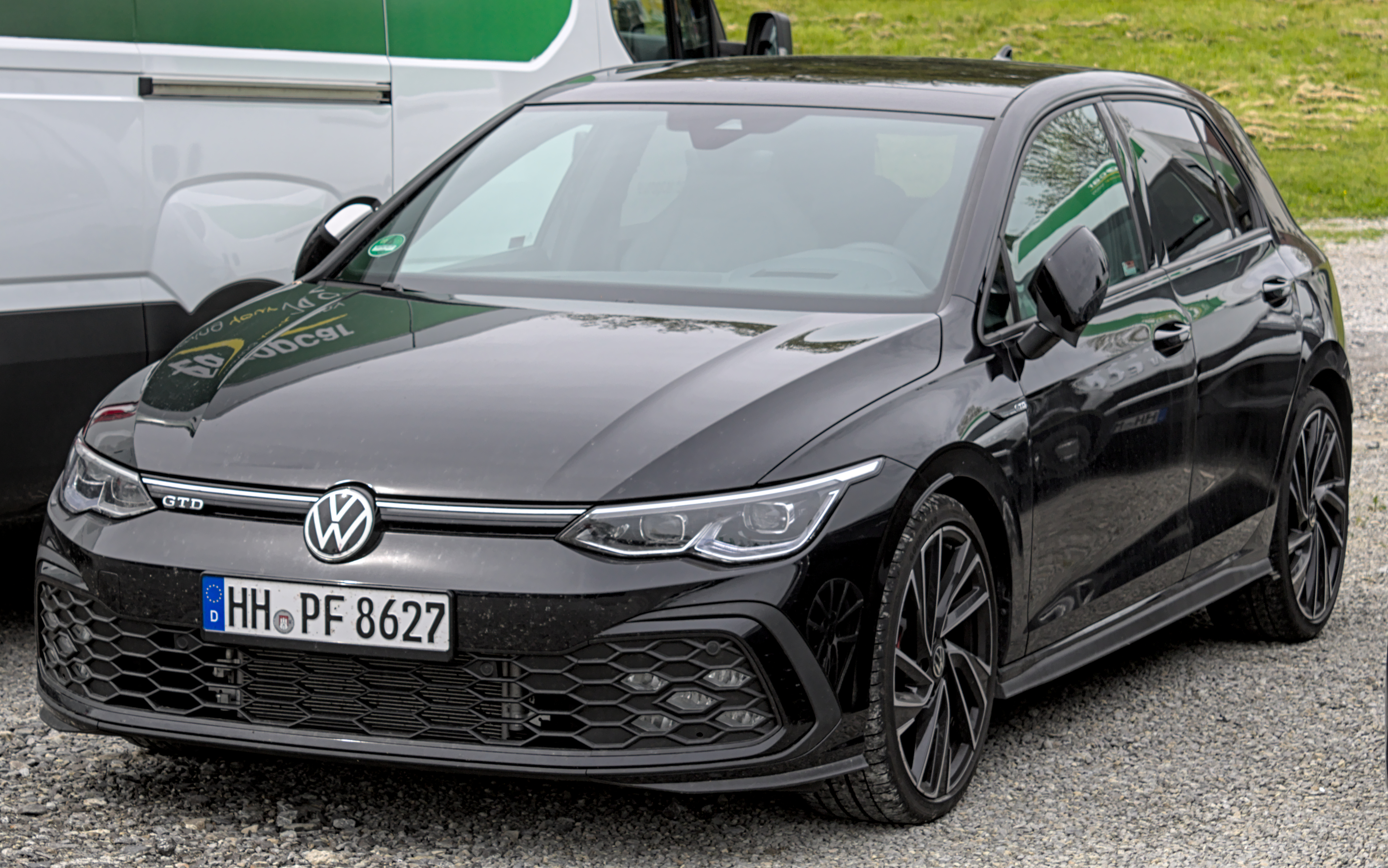
Volkswagen Golf GTD

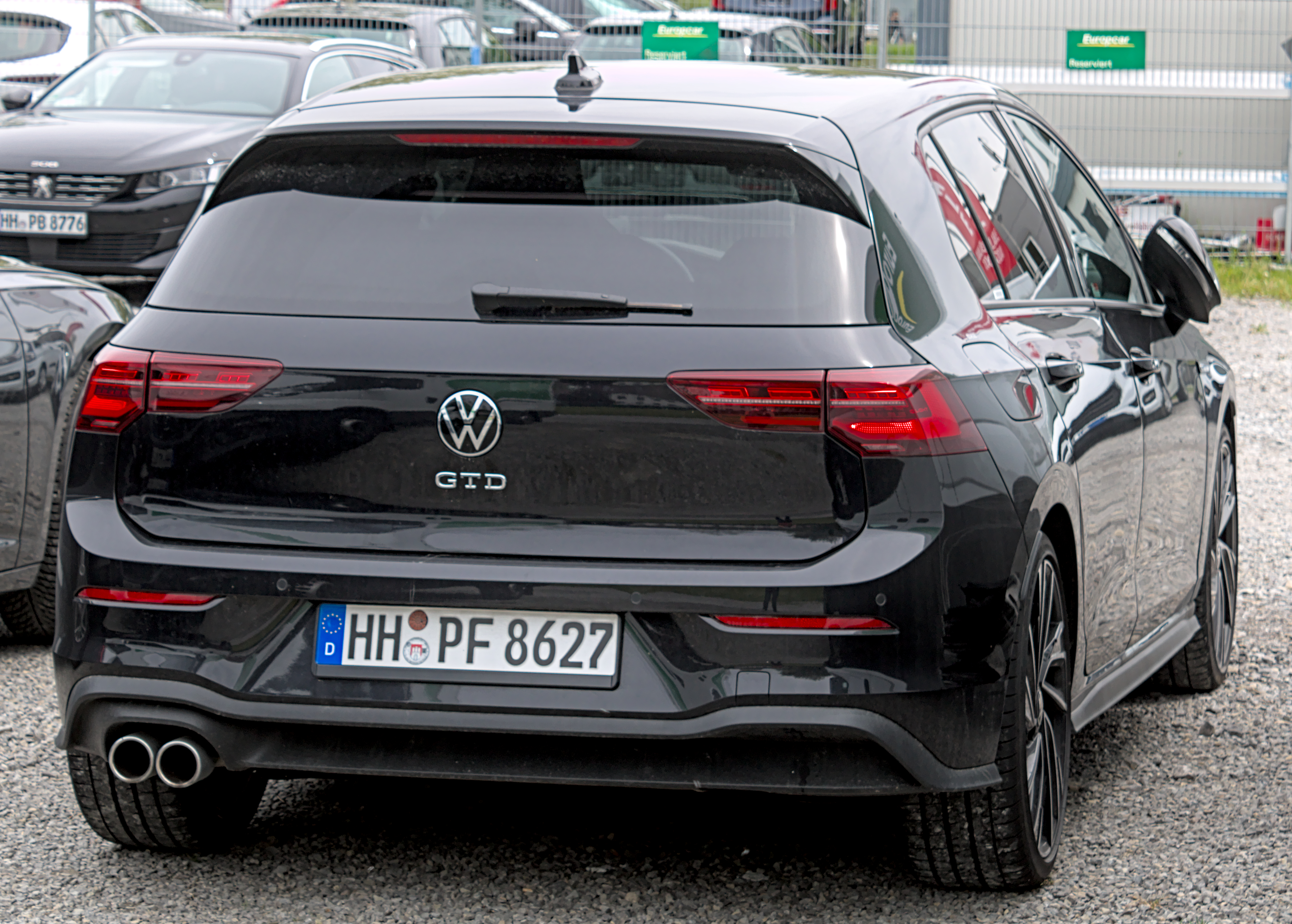
Rear view

== Golf GTI ==
The Golf GTI is a hot hatchback version that is powered by a 2.0-litre turbocharged direct-injection petrol engine (TSI) producing 245 PS (180 kW; 241 hp) and 370 N⋅m (273 lbf⋅ft). The bodywork is nearly identical to the GTE, however the GTI is equipped with different wheels, badges, and red grille accents. The rear bumper has dual exit exhausts. Vehicle Dynamics Manager allows for more adjustability of the adaptive suspension dampers, while an Individual setting joins the other driving modes. The suspension is lowered by 15 mm (0.6 in). Inside, plaid upholstery is standard, with additional red accents on the seats and steering wheel. 17-inch wheels are standard in Europe, with optional 18-inch and 19-inch wheels.

Golf GTI

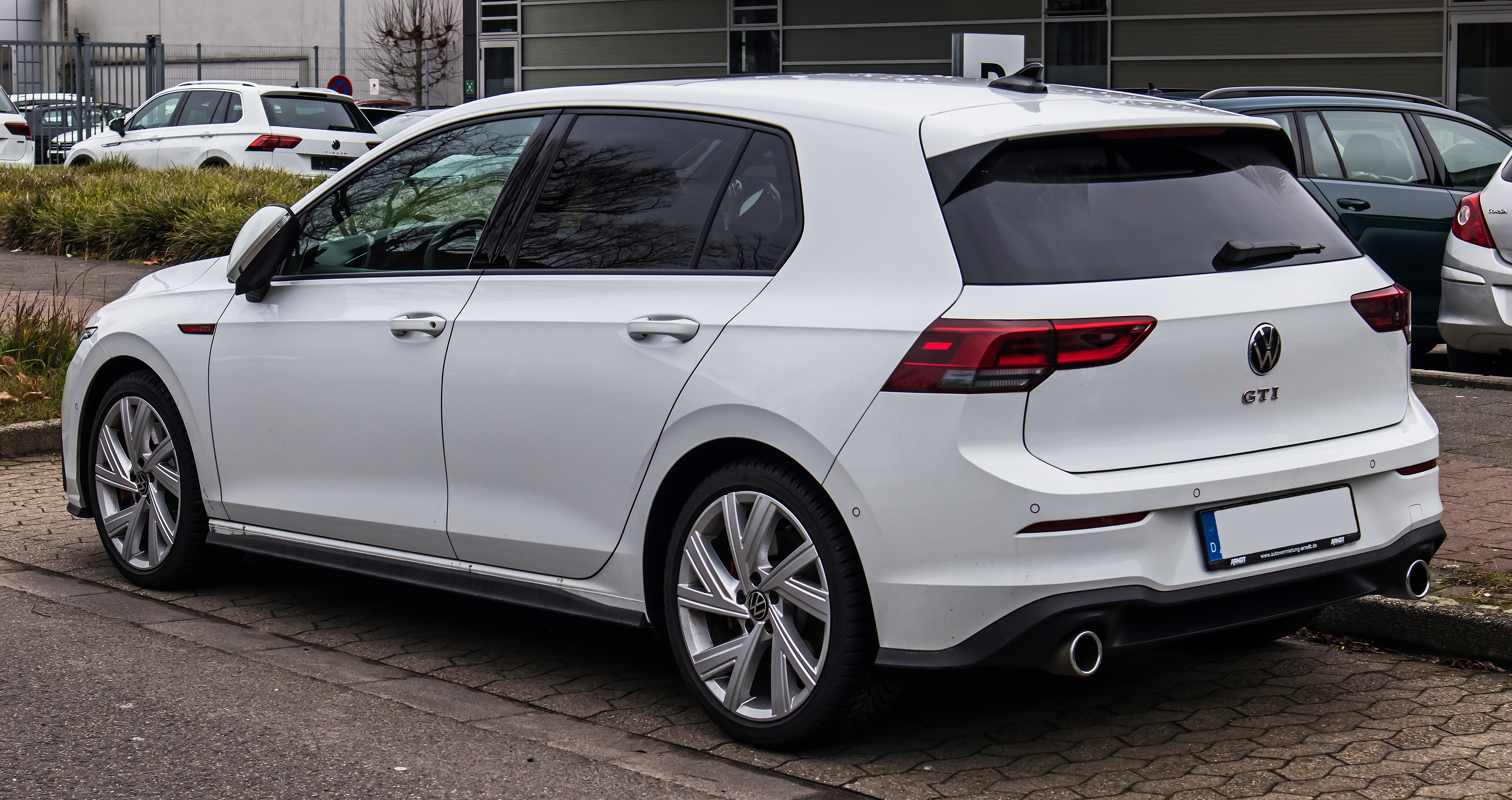
Rear view

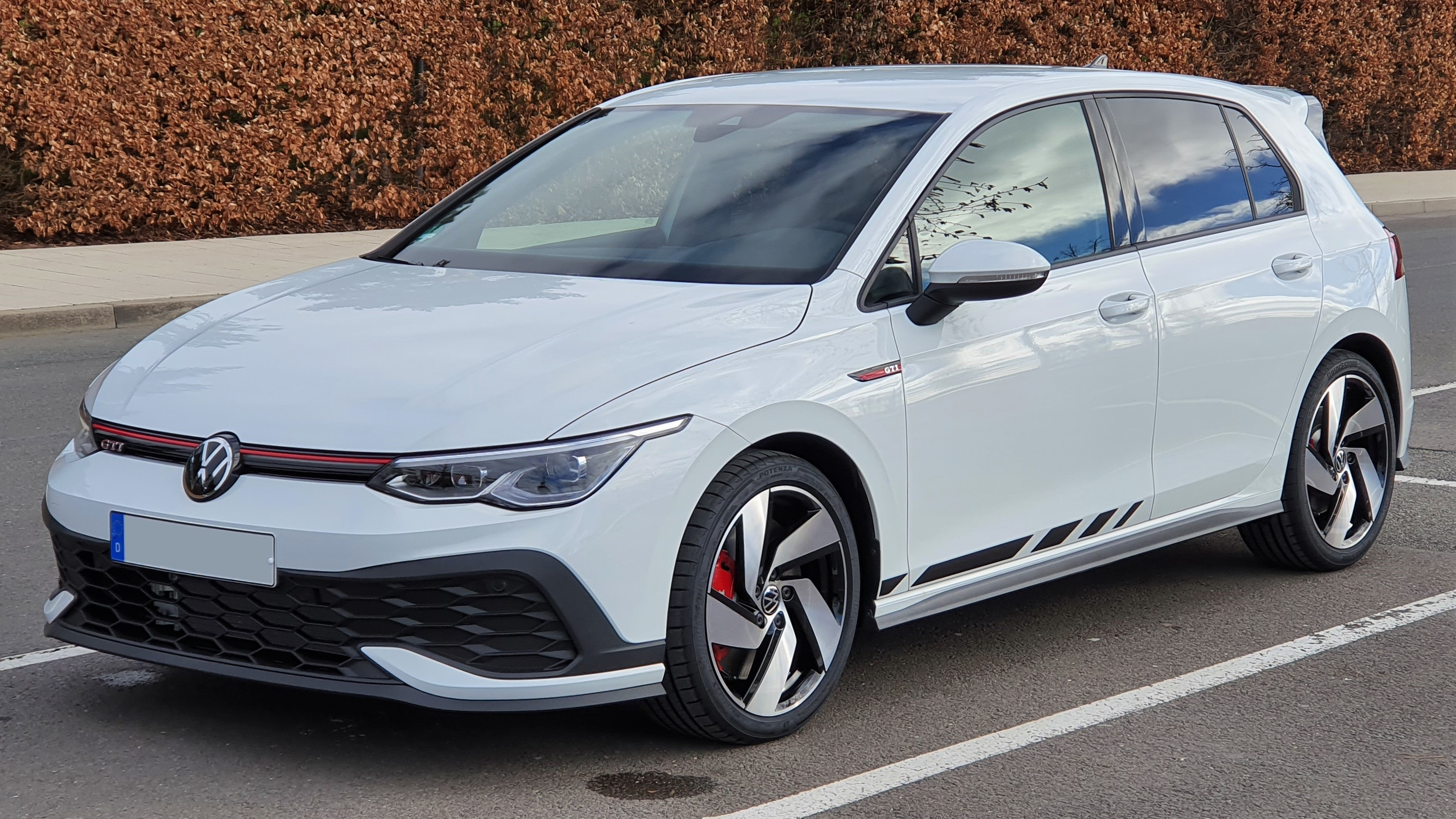
Volkswagen Golf GTI Clubsport

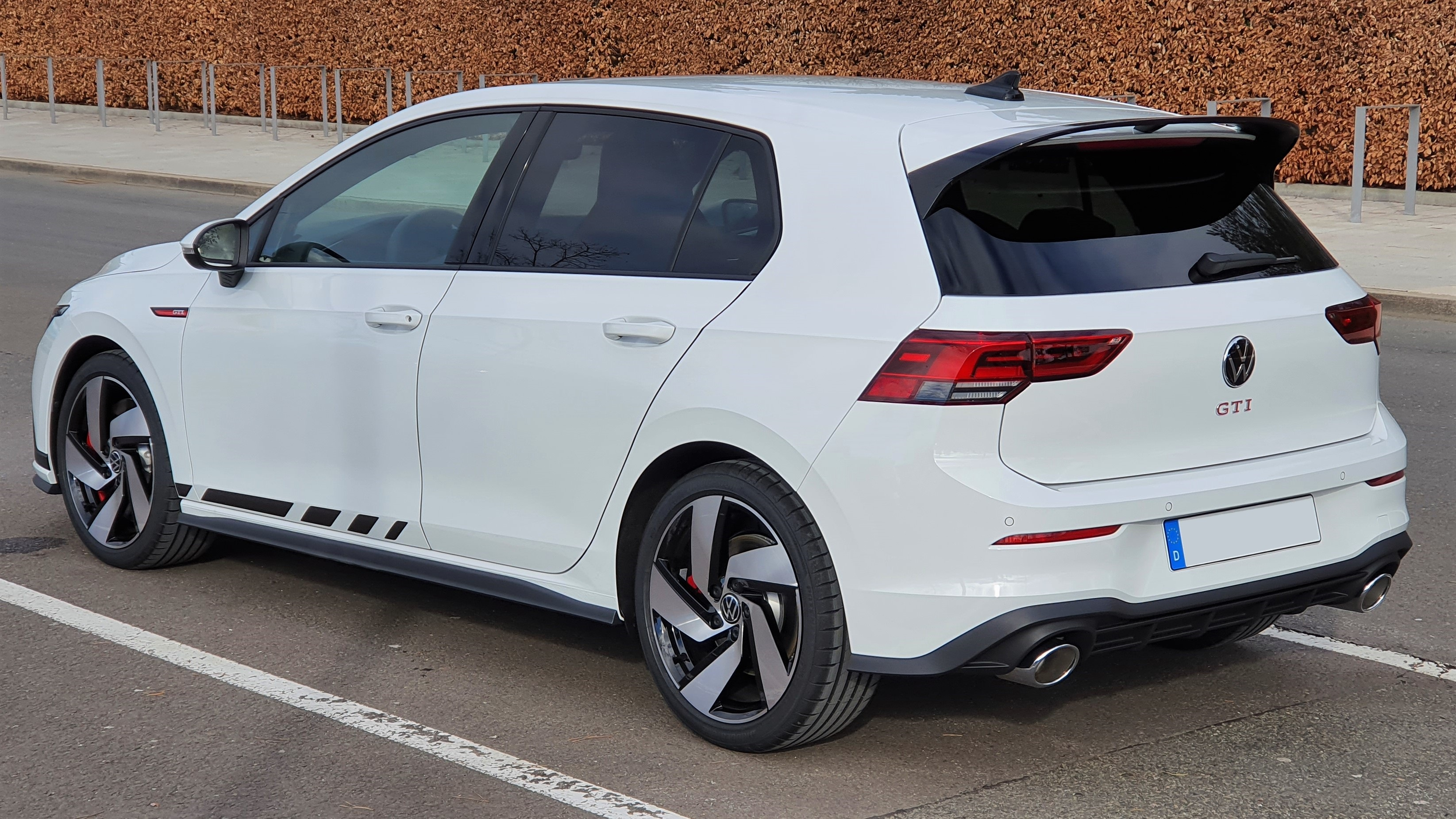
Golf GTI Clubsport rear view

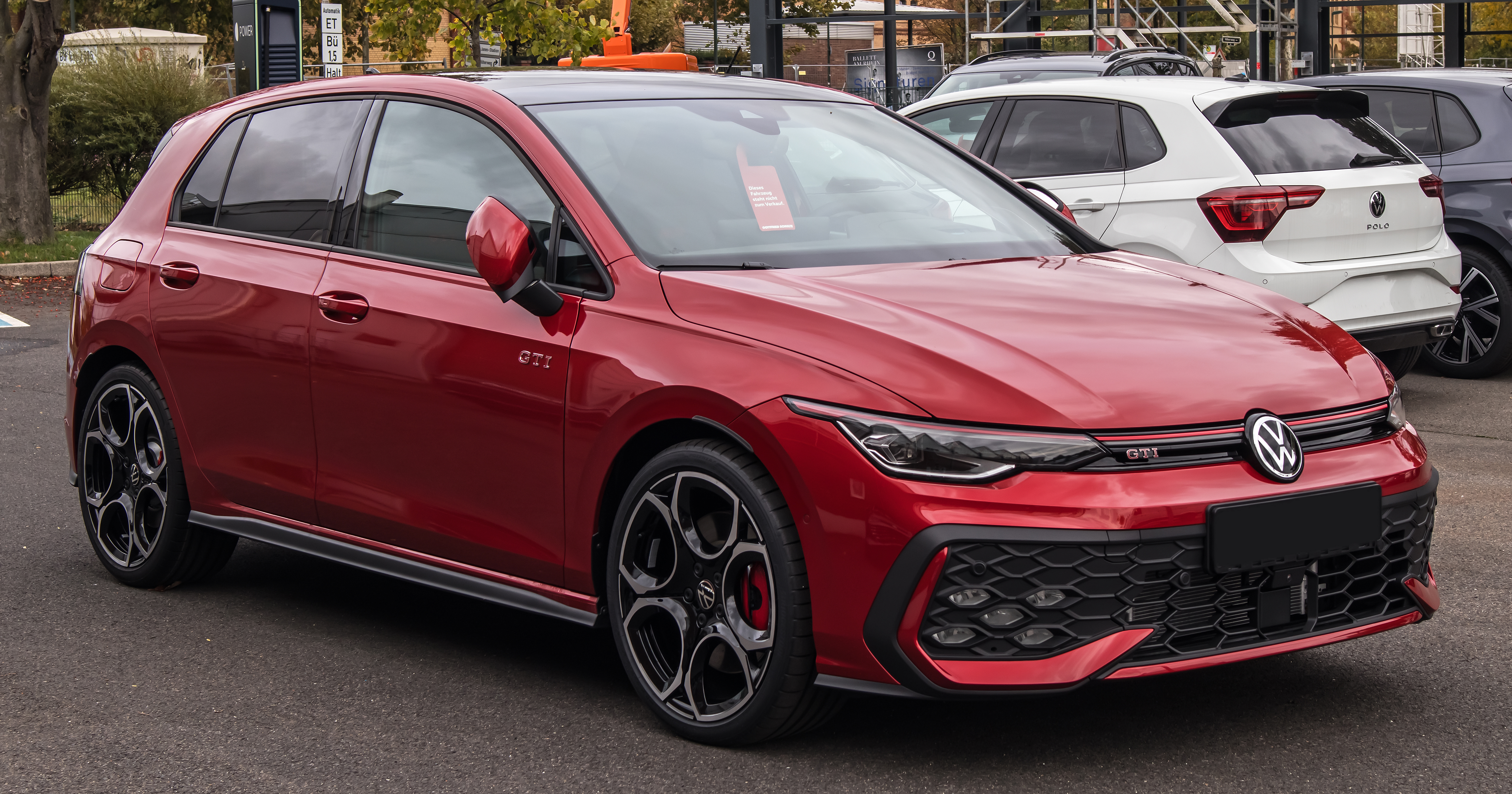
Golf GTI (2024 facelift)

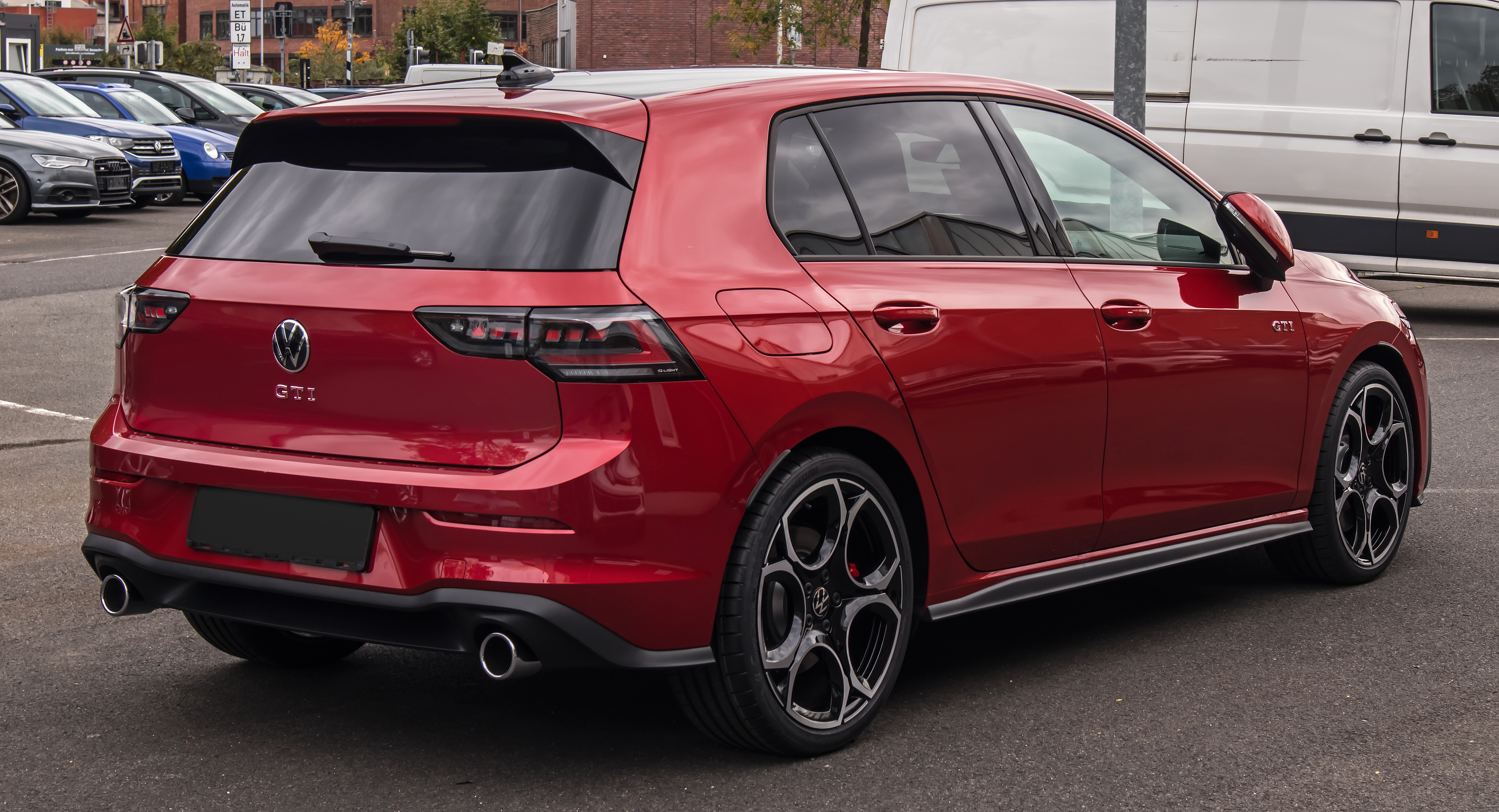
Rear view (2024 facelift)

=== Golf GTI 380 ===
Announced by Volkswagen of America on 30 August 2023, the Golf GTI 380 is a special edition model for the 2024 North American model year. It is a commemorative model celebrating the Golf GTI's final production year with a manual transmission in North America. Future model years will only offer Volkswagen’s DSG transmission.

== Golf R ==
The Golf R is powered by a 2.0-litre turbocharged direct-injection petrol engine (TSI) producing 320 PS (235 kW; 315 hp) and 420 N⋅m (310 lbf⋅ft) which is an increase of 20 PS (15 kW; 20 hp) and 40 N⋅m (30 lbf⋅ft) when compared to the Mk7. It is offered with either the seven-speed dual-clutch automatic globally or the six-speed manual (US and Canadian markets only) in both the hatch and estate body styles. The R is 20 mm (0.8 in) lower than the standard Golf, and has a stiffer suspension incorporating an aluminium front subframe. The all-wheel-drive system has been updated and benefits from a torque-vectoring rear differential. Dynamic Chassis Control has also been updated to work with the Vehicle Dynamics Manager, allowing for a Drift Mode function. The exterior features quad exhaust tips and 19-inch wheels, while the interior is similar to the GTI, and has Nappa leather bucket seats as well as several R badges and an R-specific driver's display.

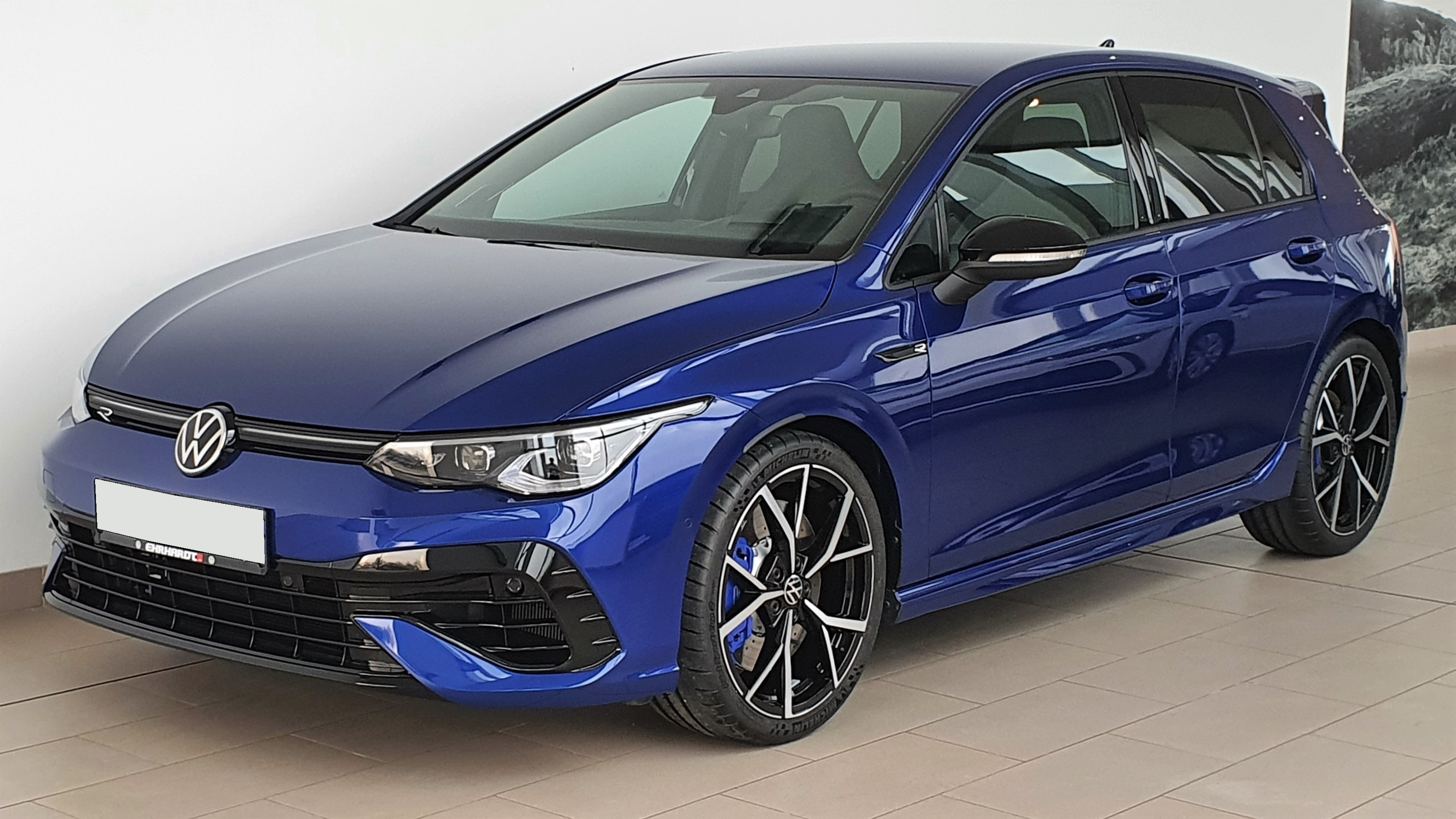
Volkswagen Golf R

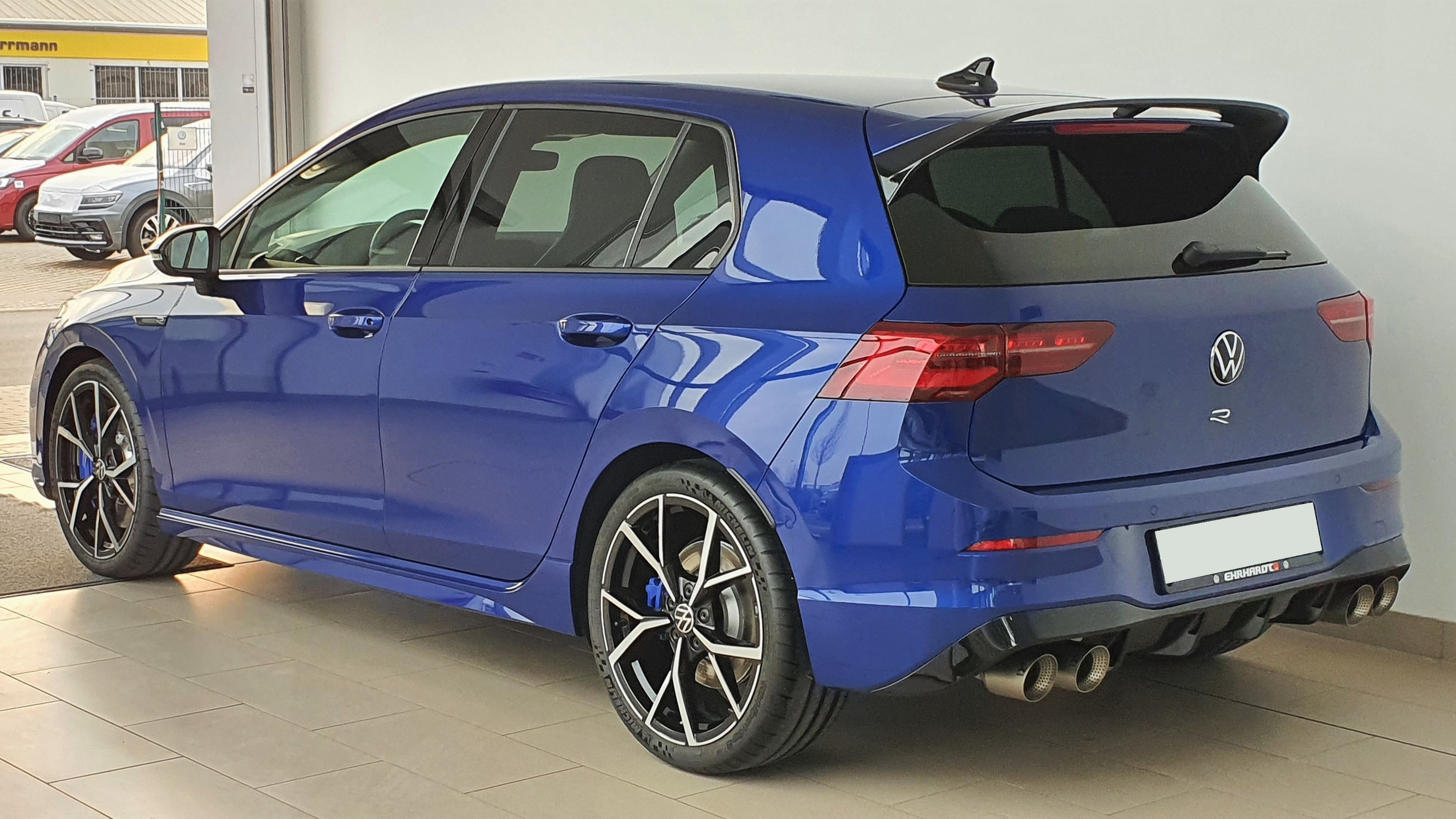
Rear view

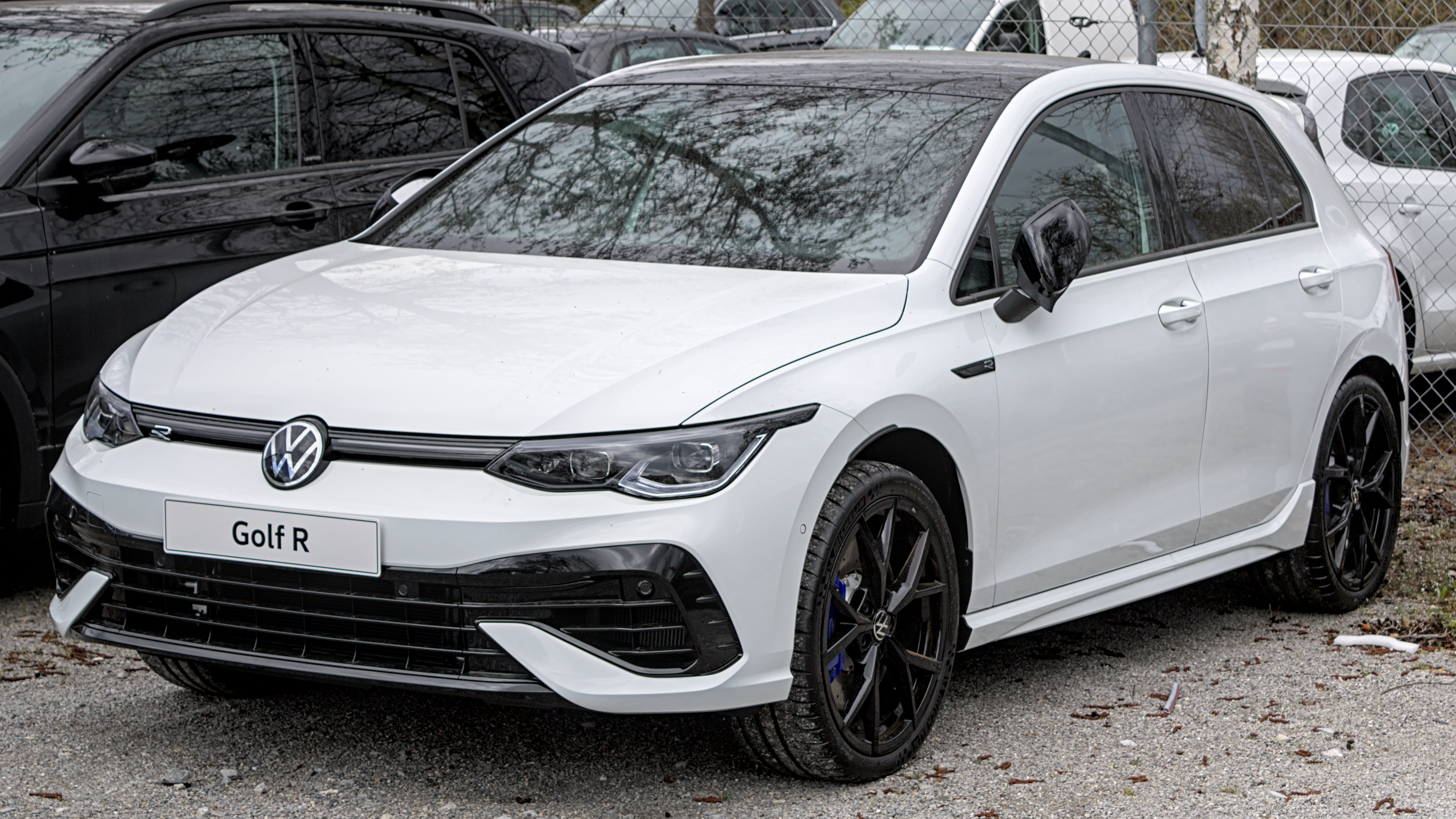
Front view

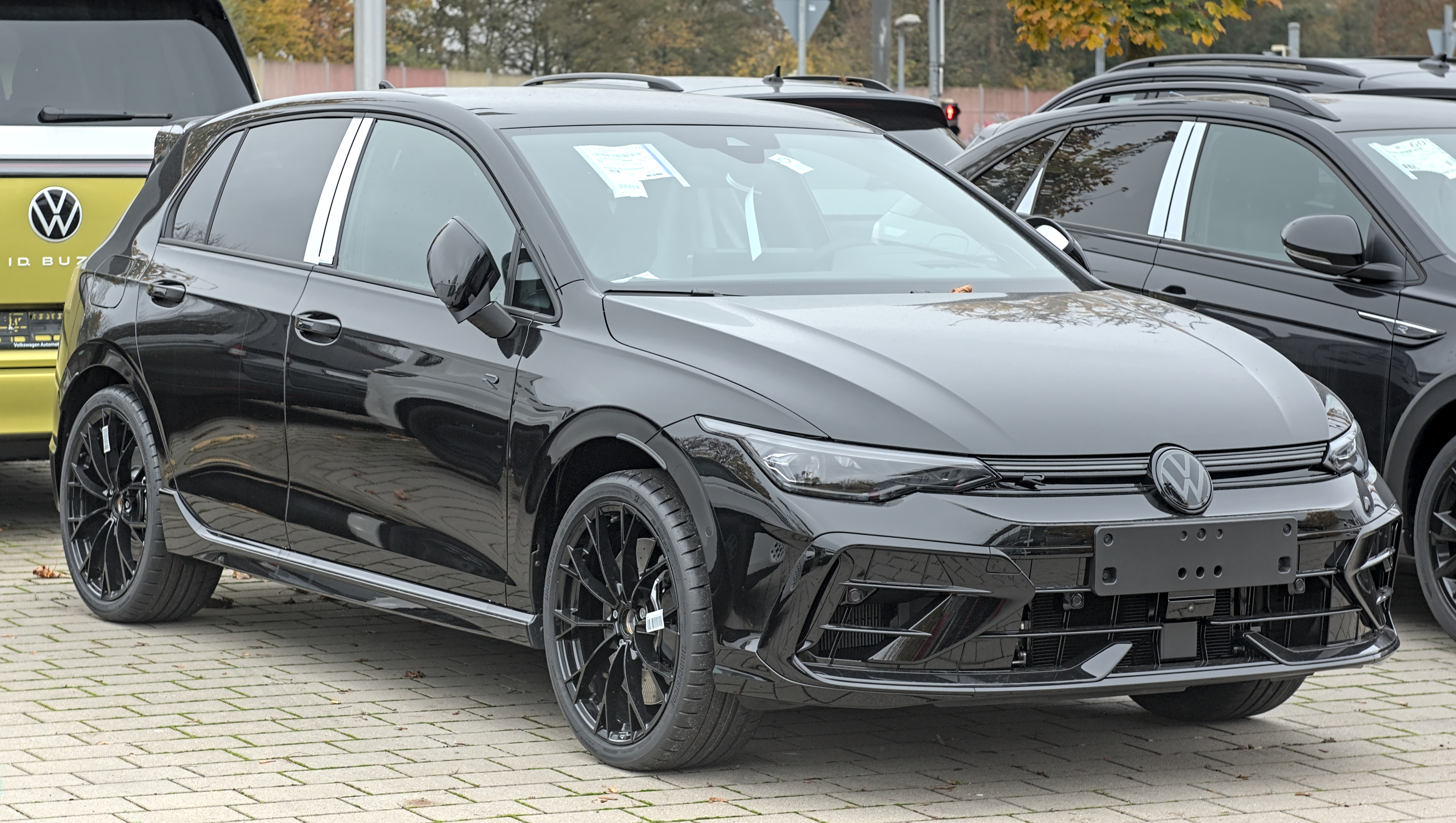
Golf R (2024 facelift)

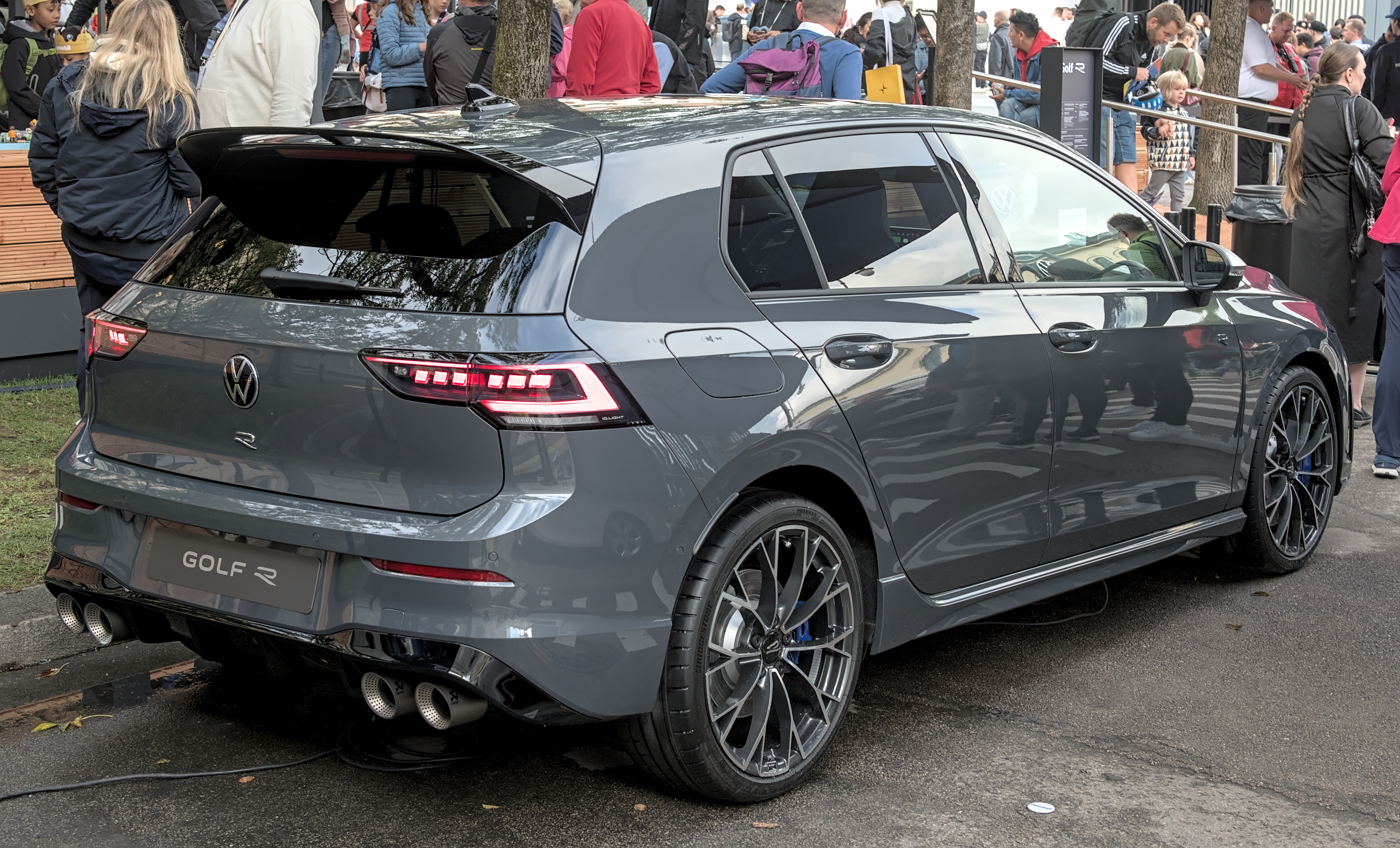
Rear view (2024 facelift)

=== Golf R 333 ===
Debuted on 31 May 2023, the limited edition Golf R 333 is meant to replace the 2022 Golf R "20 Years Edition".

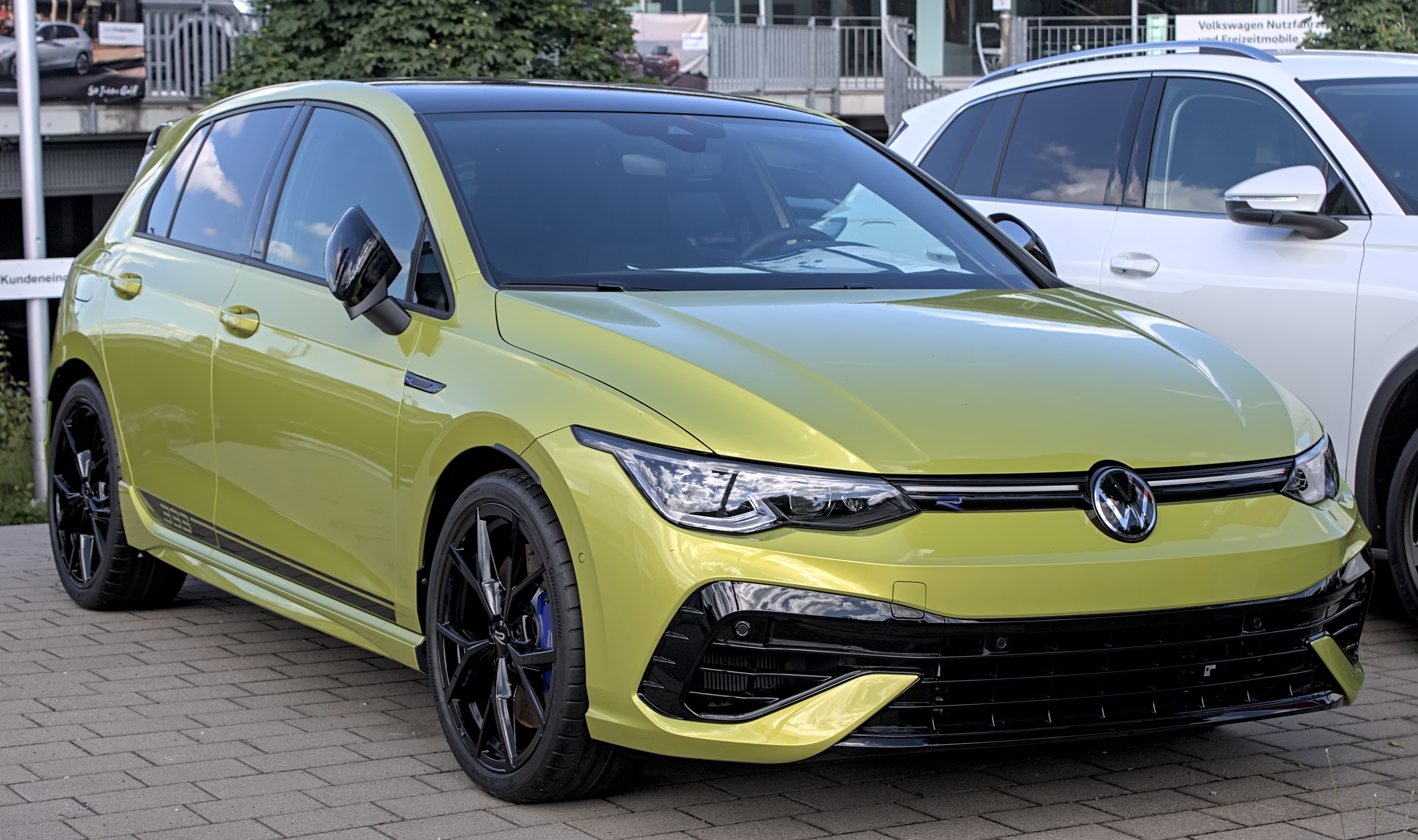
Volkswagen Golf R 333

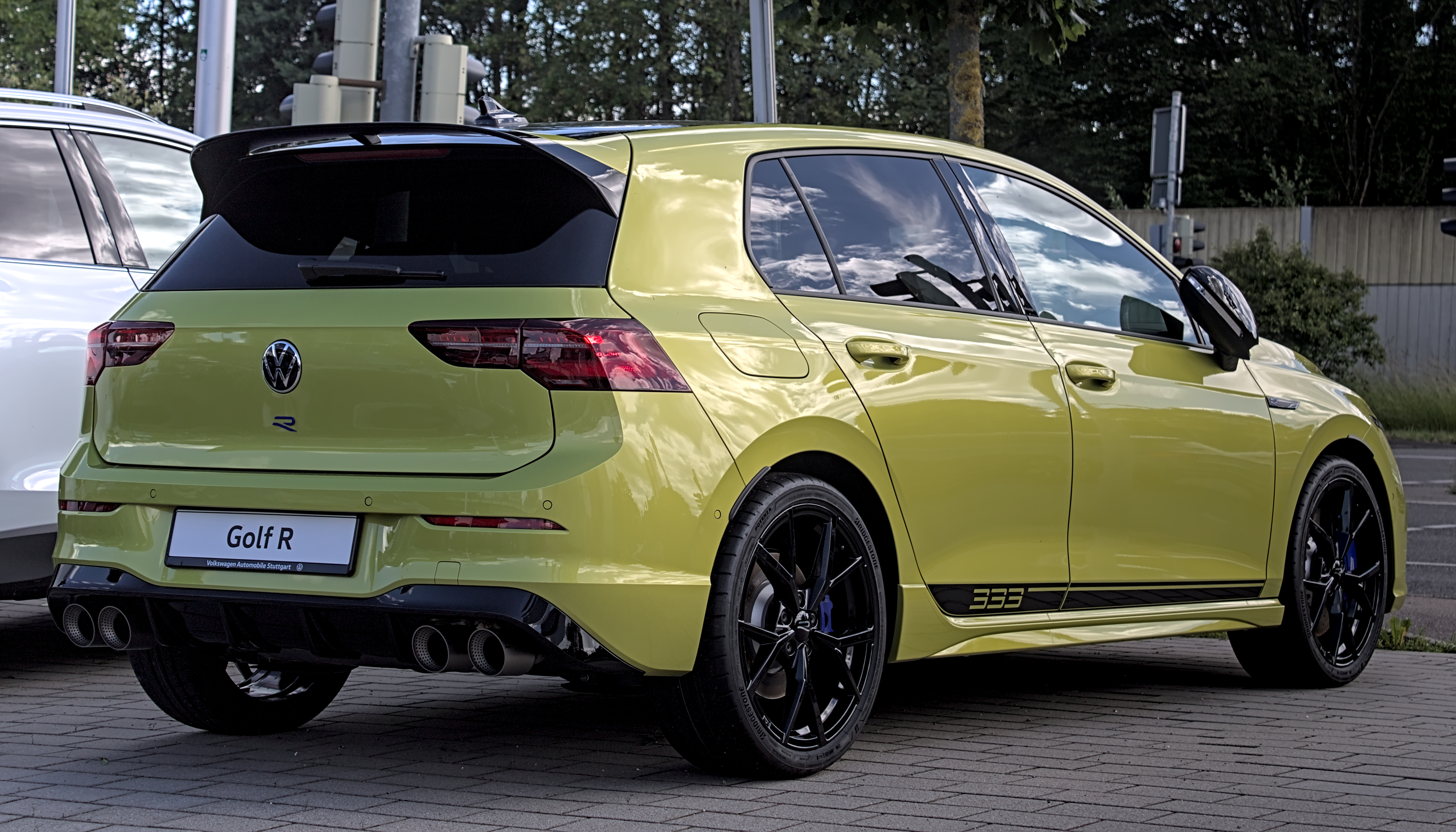
Rear view

== Facelift ==
In January 2024, the Golf range was given a mild facelift, known as the Golf Mk8.5. Changes include redesigned headlights with hexagonal-shaped, daytime running lights and a new option of an IQ.Light LED matrix setup, a new illuminated logo, new bumpers, new taillights with three selectable patterns, new exterior colours, new alloy wheel designs, a new MIB4 software for the infotainment system, touch-slider controls for HVAC controls are illuminated, the most expensive Golf variants revert to conventional buttons on the multi-functional steering wheel, a few new driver assistance system features and updated standard features across trim levels. The facelift continues to be offered in both hatchback and Variant (estate) body styles.

The most significant interior update is the introduction of the MIB4 infotainment system, featuring a faster processor and available in 10.4-inch or 12.9-inch floating touchscreen configurations. Volkswagen replaced the controversial touch-sensitive steering wheel controls with physical buttons in response to customer feedback. The touch sliders controlling cabin temperature are now illuminated for improved nighttime visibility. The system integrates ChatGPT into the IDA voice assistant, though this feature has received mixed reviews.

The powertrain lineup includes four turbocharged petrol engines (TSI), two turbodiesel engines (TDI), two 48-volt mild hybrid turbocharged petrol engines (eTSI), and two plug-in hybrid petrol systems (eHybrid and GTE). At launch, the 1.5-liter TSI engine is available with either 115 or 150 PS paired with a six-speed manual transmission, while the 1.5 eTSI mild hybrid variants offer the same power outputs exclusively with a seven-speed dual-clutch transmission. The updated eHybrid and GTE plug-in hybrid models feature a larger 1.5-liter TSI engine replacing the previous 1.4-liter unit, paired with a 19.7 kWh battery providing up to 82 miles of electric range. Manual transmission options were discontinued globally for the 2025 model year, with DSG dual-clutch transmissions becoming standard across the range.

The Golf R variant received a power increase for the Mk8.5 update, with the 2.0-liter EA888 turbocharged four-cylinder engine now producing 333 PS and 310 lb-ft of torque, representing a 14 PS increase over the previous model. Acceleration from 0-62 mph is achieved in 4.6 seconds for the hatchback and 4.8 seconds for the Variant estate, with power delivered through a seven-speed DSG transmission and Volkswagen's 4Motion all-wheel drive system. The GTI Clubsport, Golf R, and Golf Variant R received the facelift treatment in the second half of 2024.

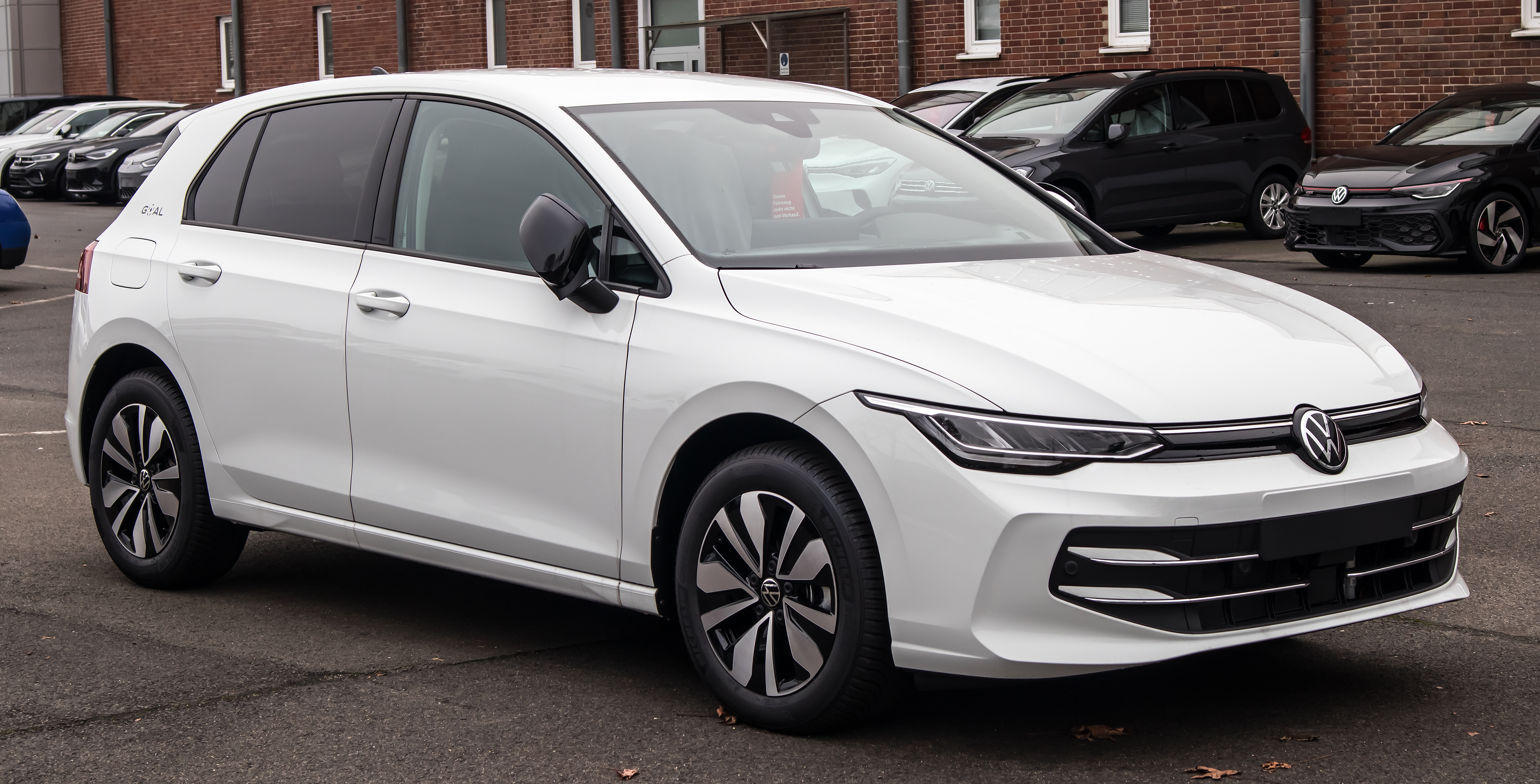
Volkswagen Golf (facelift)

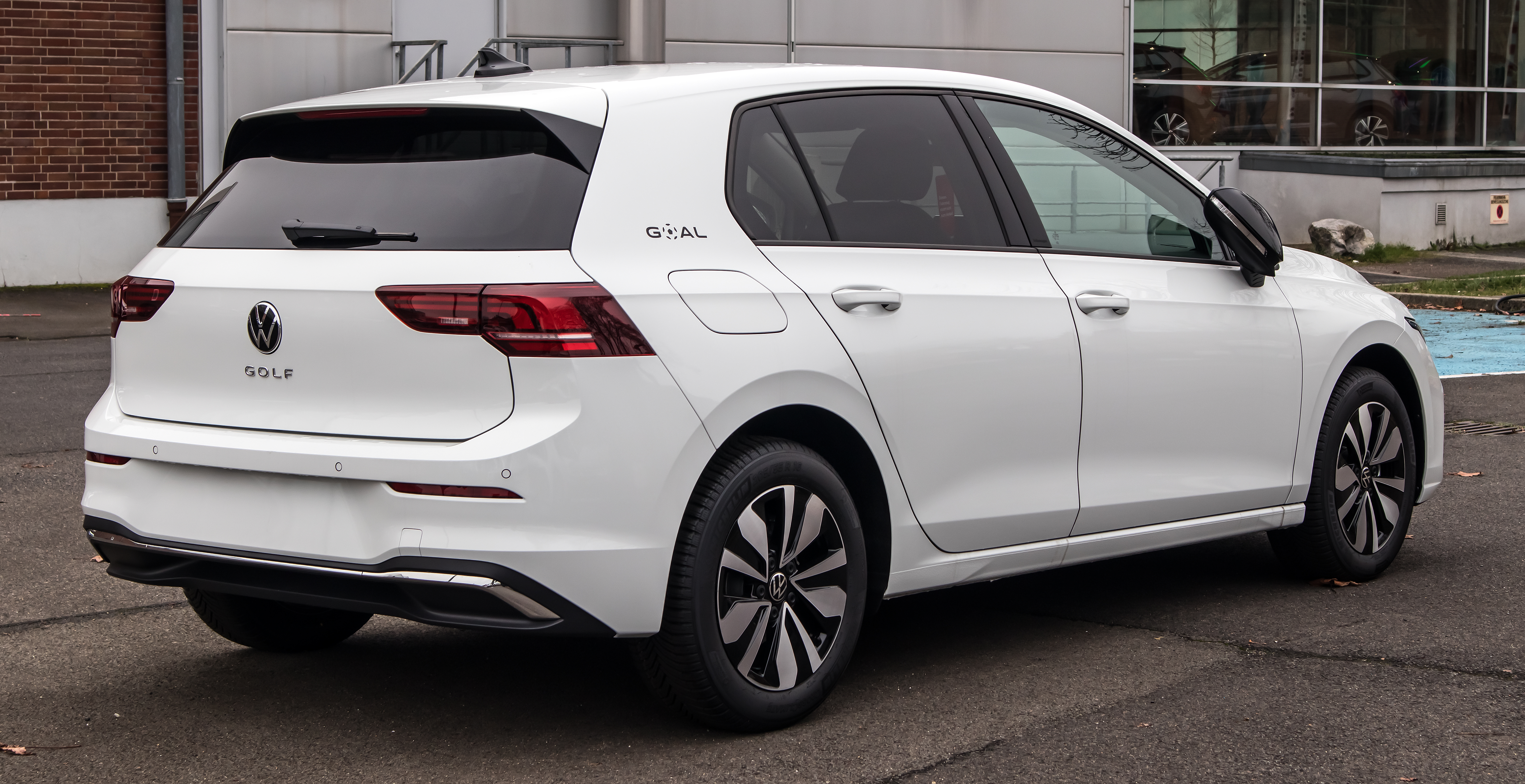
Rear view

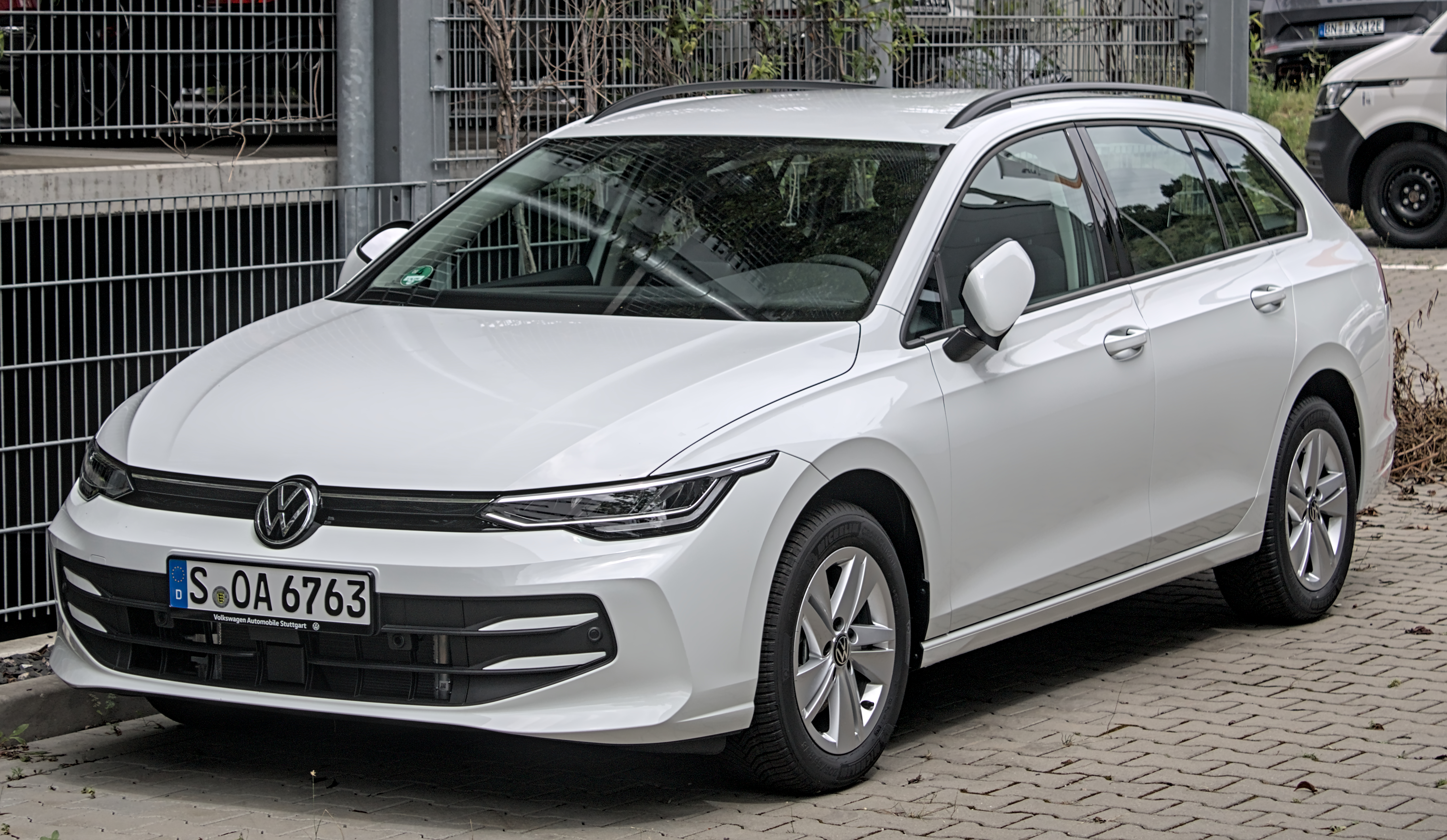
Volkswagen Golf Variant (facelift)

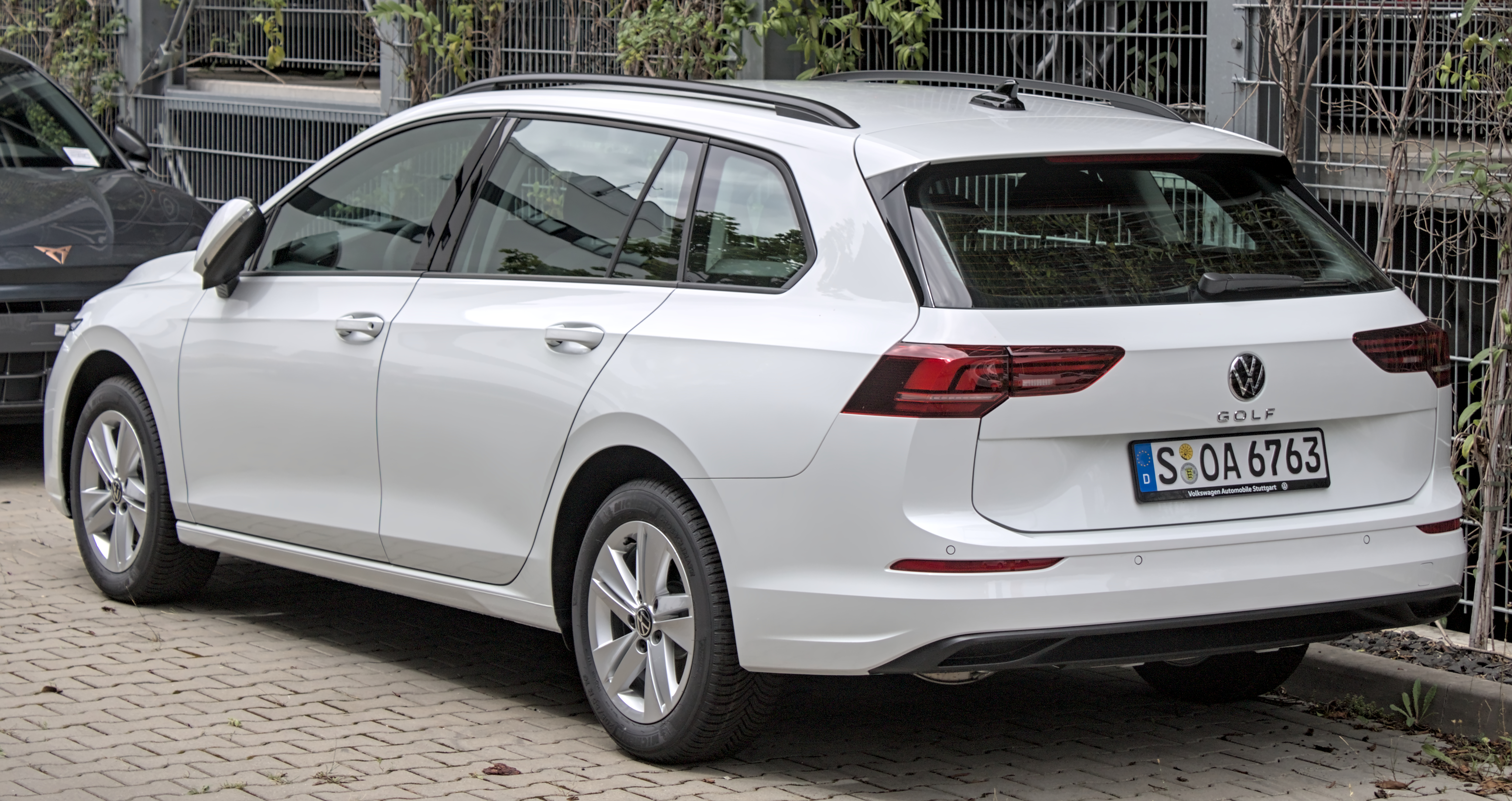
Rear view

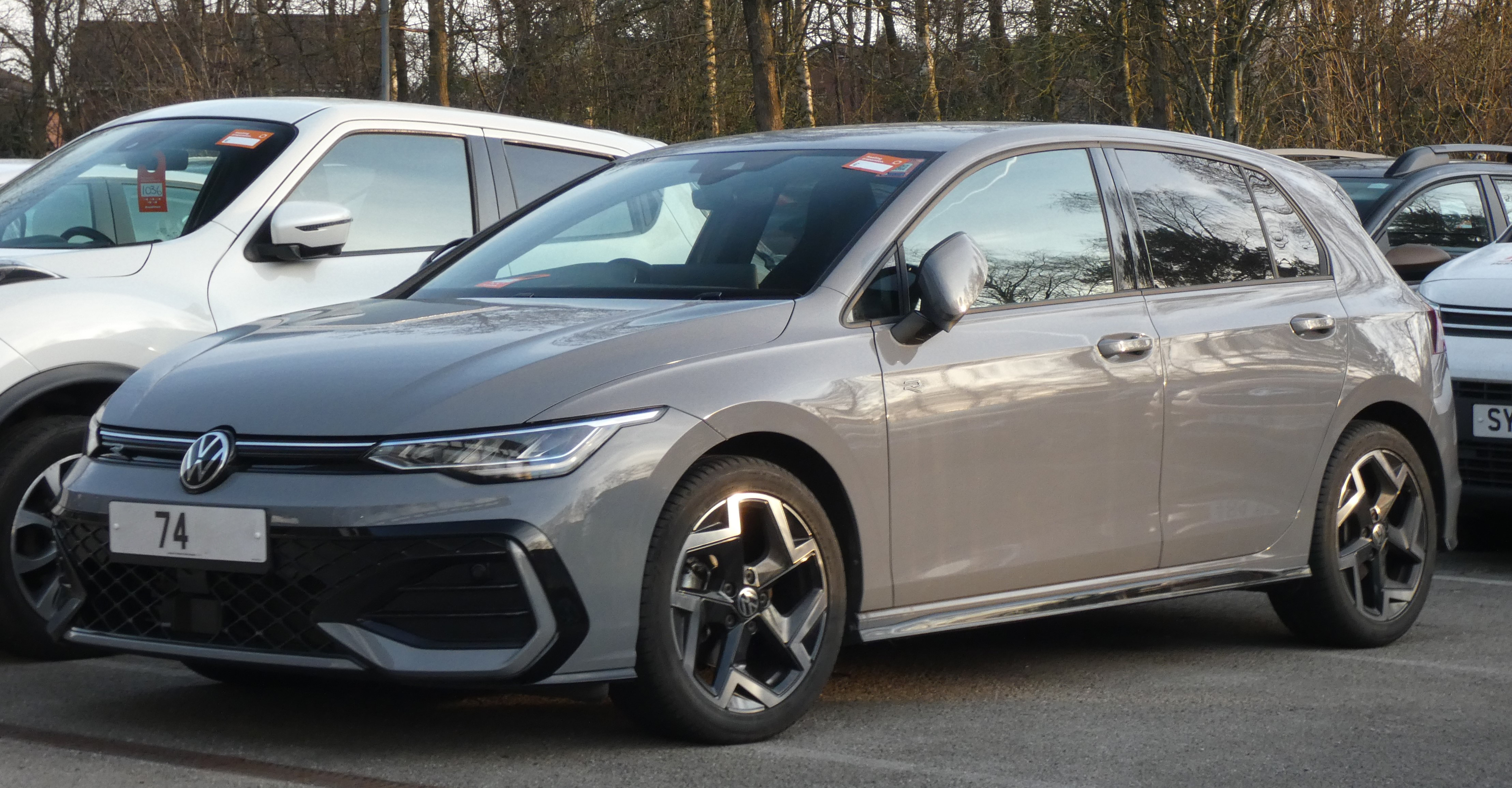
Volkswagen Golf R-Line (facelift)

== Powertrain ==
All internal combustion engines are turbocharged three- or four-cylinder units; engine options include petrol, mild-hybrid, plug-in hybrid, diesel and natural gas powertrains. The previous e-Golf model is no longer available, as it was replaced by the ID.3.

TSI

Euro 6d

TSI models sold in Euro 6d compliant countries consist of a 1.0-litre turbocharged petrol engine (TSI) with 90 PS (66 kW; 89 hp) or 110 PS (81 kW; 109 hp), and a 1.5-litre turbocharged petrol engine with 130 PS (96 kW; 128 hp) or 150 PS (110 kW; 148 hp). All engines with an output up to 130 PS feature the efficient TSI Miller combustion process and a variable-geometry turbocharger, and the 1.5-litre engines have temporary Active Cylinder Management. A compressed natural gas (CNG) version of the 1.5-litre engine is also available as a TGI model. In 2024 for the Golf '8.5' the lineup was simplified to the 1.5-litre turbocharged petrol engine only with either 115 PS (85 kW; 113 hp) or 150 PS (110 kW; 148 hp).

Euro 5

TSI models sold in Euro 5 compliant countries, such as Australia, will at launch feature one option, a 1.4-litre turbocharged petrol engine (TSI) with 150 PS (110 kW; 148 hp). Unlike previous Golfs which featured a 7-speed dual-clutch gearbox (DSG), this engine will be paired with a traditional 8-speed torque converter automatic. The transmission choice is due in part to the specific engine calibration (and automatic transmission combination) developed to meet Australia's outdated Euro 5 emissions regulations introduced in 2009, which are about a decade behind European standards.

eTSI eTSI models use the same engines as the TSI models with the addition of a mild-hybrid system and a powerful brake energy recuperation function, paired exclusively with the 7-speed dual-clutch gearbox (DSG). The energy stored in the 48 V lithium-ion battery supplies the 12 V vehicle electrical system and drives the 48 V belt starter generator. The engines produce 110 PS (81 kW; 109 hp), 130 PS (96 kW; 130 hp) or 150 PS (110 kW; 148 hp).

eHybrid eHybrid models use a 1.4-litre turbocharged plug-in hybrid engine supplemented by a 13 kWh lithium ion battery, with a 6-speed DSG. The all-electric range is rated at about 60 kilometres (37 miles) in EV mode. The engine produces 204 PS (150 kW; 201 hp) or 245 PS (180 kW; 241 hp).

TDI TDI models utilise a new twin dosing system featuring dual AdBlue selective catalytic reduction, which lowers nitrogen oxide emissions (NOx) by up to 80% compared to the Mk7. A 2.0-litre turbocharged diesel unit is used, producing 115 PS (85 kW; 113 hp) or 150 PS (110 kW; 148 hp). Both engines were originally available with 6 speed manual or 7 speed automatic gear boxes depending on trim level. In 2024 for the Golf '8.5' the manual gearbox was restricted to the 115 PS (85 kW; 113 hp) and the automatic transmission to the 150 PS (110 kW; 148 hp) engines.

Petrol engines
Model	Displacement	Power	Torque	Acceleration 0–100 km/h (0-62 mph)	Top speed	Transmission	Notes
1.0 TSI	999 cc (61 cu in)	90 PS (66 kW; 89 hp)	175 N⋅m (129 lb⋅ft) at 1,600-3,000 rpm	11.9 s	188 km/h (117 mph)	5-speed manual	To 2024
1.0 TSI	999 cc (61 cu in)	110 PS (81 kW; 108 hp)	200 N⋅m (148 lb⋅ft) at 2,000-3,000 rpm	10.2 s	202 km/h (126 mph)	6-speed manual	To 2024
1.0 eTSI	999 cc (61 cu in)	110 PS (81 kW; 108 hp)	200 N⋅m (148 lb⋅ft) at 1,400-4,000 rpm	9.2 s	214 km/h (133 mph)	7-speed DSG	
1.4 TSI	1,395 cc (85 cu in)	150 PS (110 kW; 148 hp)	250 N⋅m (184 lb⋅ft) at 1,500-4,000 rpm	8.2 s	215 km/h (133.595 mph)	8-speed automatic	euro 5 compliant countries like Tunisia and Australia
1.5 TSI	1,498 cc (91 cu in)	115 PS (85 kW; 113 hp) at 5,000-6,000 rpm	220 N⋅m (162 lb⋅ft) at 1,500–3,000 rpm	9.6 s	203 km/h (126 mph)	6-speed manual	2024 on
1.5 TSI	1,498 cc (91 cu in)	130 PS (96 kW; 128 hp) at 5,000–6,000 rpm	200 N⋅m (148 lb⋅ft) at 1,400–4,000 rpm	9.2 s	214 km/h (133 mph)	6-speed manual	To 2024
1.5 TSI	1,498 cc (91 cu in)	150 PS (110 kW; 148 hp) at 5,000-6,000 rpm	250 N⋅m (184 lb⋅ft) at 1,500–3,500 rpm	8.5 s	224 km/h (139 mph)	6-speed manual	
1.5 eTSI	1,498 cc (91 cu in)	130 PS (96 kW; 128 hp) at 5,000-6,000 rpm	200 N⋅m (148 lb⋅ft) at 1,400–4,000 rpm	9.6 s	206 km/h (128 mph)	7-speed DSG	
1.5 eTSI	1,498 cc (91 cu in)	150 PS (110 kW; 148 hp) at 5,000-6,000 rpm	250 N⋅m (184 lb⋅ft) at 1,500-3,500 rpm	8.5 s	224 km/h (139 mph)	7-speed DSG	
1.5 TGI	1,498 cc (91 cu in)	130 PS (96 kW; 128 hp) at 5,000-6,000 rpm	200 N⋅m (148 lb⋅ft) at 1,500-3,500 rpm	9.2 s	224 km/h (139 mph)	7-speed DSG	Main fuel is CNG, but the car also has a small 9l petrol tank
2.0 TSI	1.984 cc (121 cu in)	190 PS (140 kW; 187 hp)	320 N⋅m (236 lb⋅ft) at 1,500-4100 rpm	7.1 s	238 km/h (148 mph)	7-speed DSG	Only offered in certain countries, on selected trim levels
1.4 TSI eHybrid	1,395 cc (85 cu in)	204 PS (150 kW; 201 hp)	350 N⋅m (258 lb⋅ft)	7.4 s	220 km/h (137 mph)	6-speed DSG	
GTE	1,395 cc (85 cu in)	245 PS (180 kW; 242 hp)	400 N⋅m (295 lb⋅ft)	6.7 s	225 km/h (140 mph)	6-speed DSG	
GTI	1,984 cc (121 cu in)	245 PS (180 kW; 242 hp)	370 N⋅m (273 lb⋅ft)	6.3 s	250 km/h (155 mph)	6-speed manual 7-speed DSG (optional)	6-speed manual no longer available on Mk8.5 GTI, Mk8.5 GTI has power output of 265 PS (195 kW; 261 hp)
GTI Clubsport	1,984 cc (121 cu in)	300 PS (221 kW; 296 hp)	400 N⋅m (295 lb⋅ft)	5.6 s	250 km/h (155 mph)	6-speed manual 7-speed DSG (optional)	6-speed manual no longer available on Mk8.5 GTI
R	1,984 cc (121 cu in)	320 PS (235 kW; 316 hp)	379 N⋅m (280 lb⋅ft) (manual); 420 N⋅m (310 lb⋅ft) (DSG)	4.7 s (DSG)	250 km/h (155 mph)	6-speed manual (North America); 7-speed DSG	
Diesel engines
Model	Displacement	Power	Torque	Acceleration 0–100 km/h (0-62 mph)	Top speed	Transmission	Notes
2.0 TDI	1,968 cc (120 cu in)	115 PS (85 kW; 113 hp) at 3,250–4,000 rpm	300 N⋅m (221 lb⋅ft) at 1,750–3,200 rpm	10.2 s	202 km/h (126 mph)	6-speed manual 7-speed DSG (to 2024)	Euro 6d-TEMP
2.0 TDI	1,968 cc (120 cu in)	150 PS (110 kW; 148 hp) at 3,500–4,000 rpm	360 N⋅m (266 lb⋅ft) at 1,750–3,000 rpm	8.8 s	223 km/h (139 mph)	6-speed manual (to 2024); 7-speed DSG	Euro 6d-TEMP
GTD	1,968 cc (120 cu in)	200 PS (147 kW; 197 hp)	400 N⋅m (295 lb⋅ft)	7.0 s	244 km/h (152 mph)	7-speed DSG	To 2024; Euro 6d

Manual transmission options were not available in the Australian market. The last manual transmission offered for the Golf in Australia was in the Mk7.5 MY19.

== Safety ==
=== ANCAP ===
ANCAP test results* Volkswagen Golf all Golf 8 variants (2019, aligned with Euro NCAP)
Test	Points	%
Overall:	5 /5 stars	
Adult occupant:	36.2	95%
Child occupant:	43.7	89%
Pedestrian:	36.7	76%
Safety assist:	10.4	80%

=== Euro NCAP ===
Euro NCAP test results* Volkswagen Golf 1.5 petrol 'Comfortline' (LHD) (2019)
Test	Points	%
Overall:	5 /5 stars	
Adult occupant:	36.3	95%
Child occupant:	44	89%
Pedestrian:	36.8	76%
Safety assist:	10.2	78%

Euro NCAP test results Volkswagen Golf 1.5 petrol 'Life' (LHD) (2025)
Test	Points	%
Overall:	5 /5 stars	
Adult occupant:	32.1	80%
Child occupant:	42.2	86%
Pedestrian:	53.9	85%
Safety assist:	14.3	79%

=== IIHS ===
==== Golf GTI ====
The 2022 Golf GTI was tested by the IIHS and received a Top Safety Pick award:

IIHS scores
Small overlap front (Driver)	Good	
Small overlap front (Passenger)	Good	
Moderate overlap front	Good	
Side (original test)	Good	
Roof strength	Good	
Head restraints and seats	Good	
Headlights	Acceptable / Marginal / Poor	varies by trim/option
Front crash prevention (Vehicle-to-Vehicle)	Superior	
Front crash prevention (Vehicle-to-Pedestrian, day)	Advanced	

==== Golf R ====
The 2022 Golf R was tested by the IIHS and received a Top Safety Pick+ award:

IIHS scores
Small overlap front (Driver)	Good
Small overlap front (Passenger)	Good
Moderate overlap front	Good
Side (original test)	Good
Roof strength	Good
Head restraints and seats	Good
Headlights	Acceptable
Front crash prevention (Vehicle-to-Vehicle)	Superior
Front crash prevention (Vehicle-to-Pedestrian, day)	Advanced

Preceded by Volkswagen Golf Mk7	Volkswagen Golf Mk8; 2019–present	Succeeded by N/A
